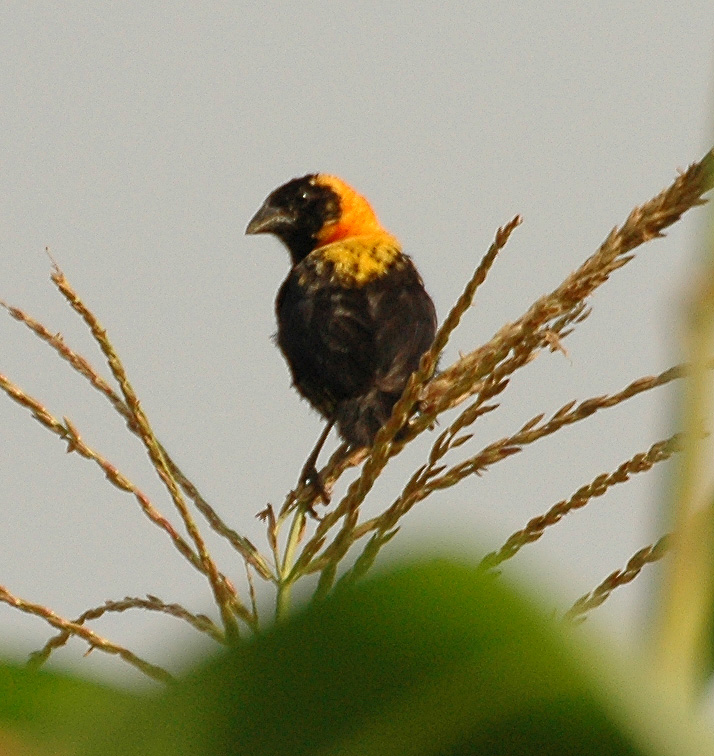
- Male in Bigodi Swamp, Uganda

Conservation status
- Least Concern (IUCN 3.1)

Scientific classification
- Kingdom: Animalia
- Phylum: Chordata
- Class: Aves
- Order: Passeriformes
- Family: Ploceidae
- Genus: Euplectes
- Species: E. gierowii

Binomial name
- Euplectes gierowii Cabanis, 1880

Synonyms
- Pyromelana ansorgei Euplectes friederichseni

= Black bishop =

Species of bird

The black bishop (Euplectes gierowii) is a species of passerine bird in the family Ploceidae native to Africa south of the Sahara. Three subspecies are recognised.

== Taxonomy ==
The black bishop was first described by the German ornithologist Jean Cabanis in 1880 and named after H. Gierow, a Swedish explorer and collector in Angola. It is sometimes placed with E. aureus and E. hordeaceus in a separate genus, Groteiplectes.

A study of the molecular phylogeny of bishops and widowbirds published in 2008 found that it formed part of a clade along with the fire-fronted bishop (E. diadematus), black-winged red bishop (E. hordeaceus), northern red bishop (E. franciscanus), southern red bishop (E. orix), Zanzibar red bishop (E. nigroventris) and red-collared widowbird (E. ardens). An alternate common name is Gierow's bishop.

=== Subspecies ===
Three subspecies of the black bishop are now recognized.

- E. g. ansorgei (E. Hartert, 1899), or northern black bishop, inhabits Cameroon, the Central African Republic, Republic of the Congo, Democratic Republic of the Congo, South Sudan, Ethiopia, Uganda, and Kenya – especially around Lake Victoria basin and Kakamega. This subspecies is named after its discoverer Dr. W. J. Ansorge.
- E. g. gierowii Cabanis, 1880, known as the Angola black bishop, inhabits Angola and the Democratic Republic of the Congo.
- E. g. friederichseni Fischer and A. Reichenow, 1884, or southern black bishop, inhabits Kenya and Tanzania around Babati, and sporadically to Lake Manyara and Serengeti National Park; possibly along Southern Uaso Nyiro River.

== Description ==
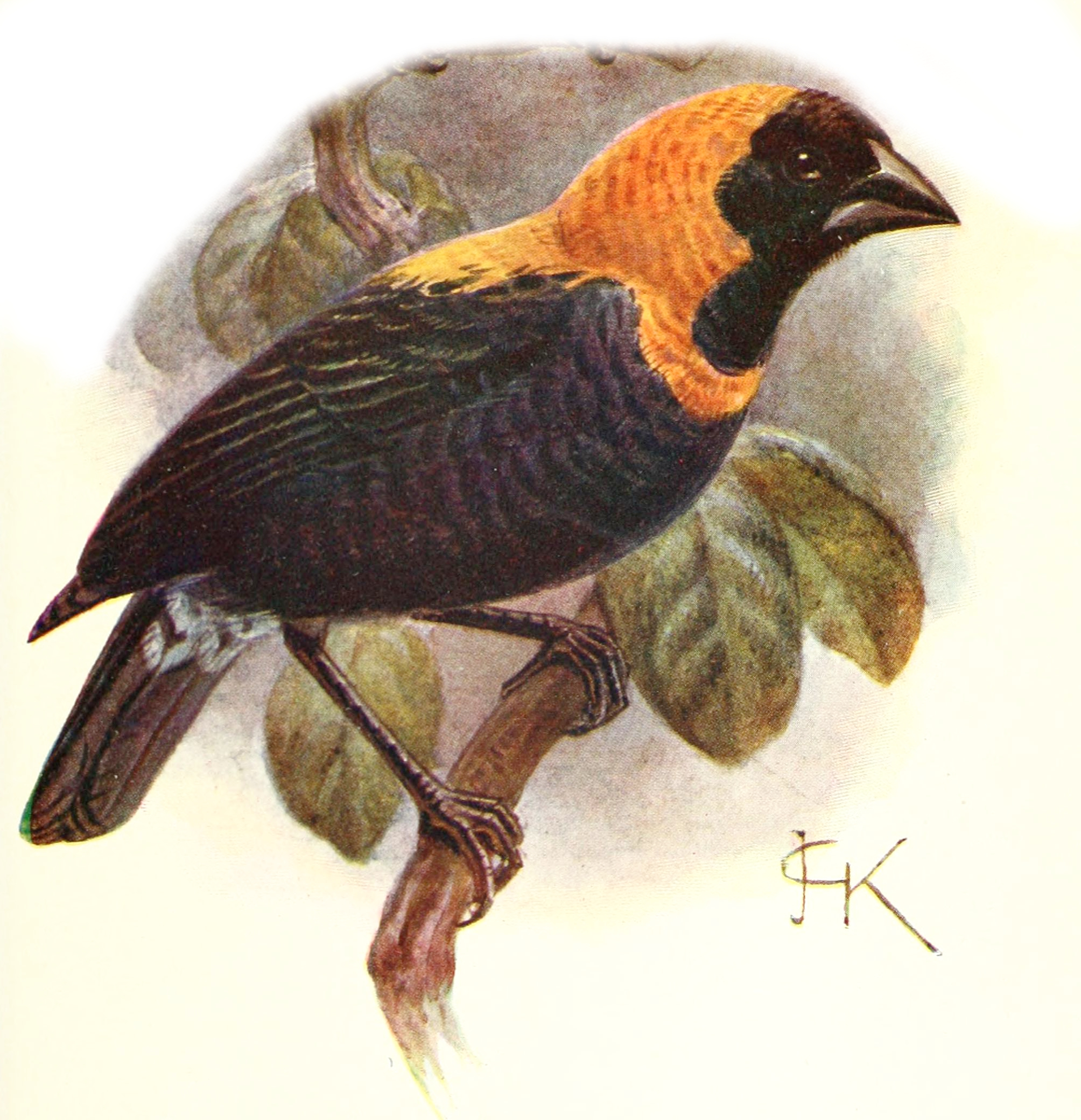
Illustration of E. g. ansorgei by J. G. Keulemans (1899)

At 14 to 16 cm (5.5–6.3 in), the black bishop is large for its genus. The breeding male is black on the wings, tail, chest, cheeks and forehead. The neck, back of the head and breast band) are orange or orange-red. The under tail-coverts are pale buff with black streaks, and the upper back is yellow or orange-yellow in subspecies ansorgei, and orange in friederichseni. The throat is scarlet in the nominate subspecies and black in ansorgei. The subspecies friederichseni has the undertail coverts isabelline. The upper back is golden yellow and the rump is brown. The conical bill, characteristic of finches, is black and the tarsus is brown. Females are dark, including the sides of the face, have boldly spotted under tail-coverts, and dark spots on a buff breast. The female's wing linings are black. The non-breeding male is black on the back, wings and rump, with yellowish supercilia and chin; the sides of face and breast are tawny buff. The juvenile resembles the female but has smaller breast spots. The calls comprise various subdued twittering sounds, including see-zee see-zee see-zhe see-zhe SEE-ZHEE, zee-zee-zeezee-zee, and hishaah, hishaah, SHAAAAAAH, tsee-tseet-tseet-tseet.

== Distribution and habitat ==
The black bishop is native to Angola, Cameroon, Central African Republic, Republic of the Congo, Democratic Republic of the Congo, Ethiopia, Kenya, South Sudan, Tanzania, and Uganda. Its preferred habitats are grasslands, shrublands, and wetlands.

== Behaviour ==
The black bishop can sometimes be found in small flocks, but is not a highly gregarious species, especially when nesting. It is probably polygynous. The male defends the territory during breeding season.
