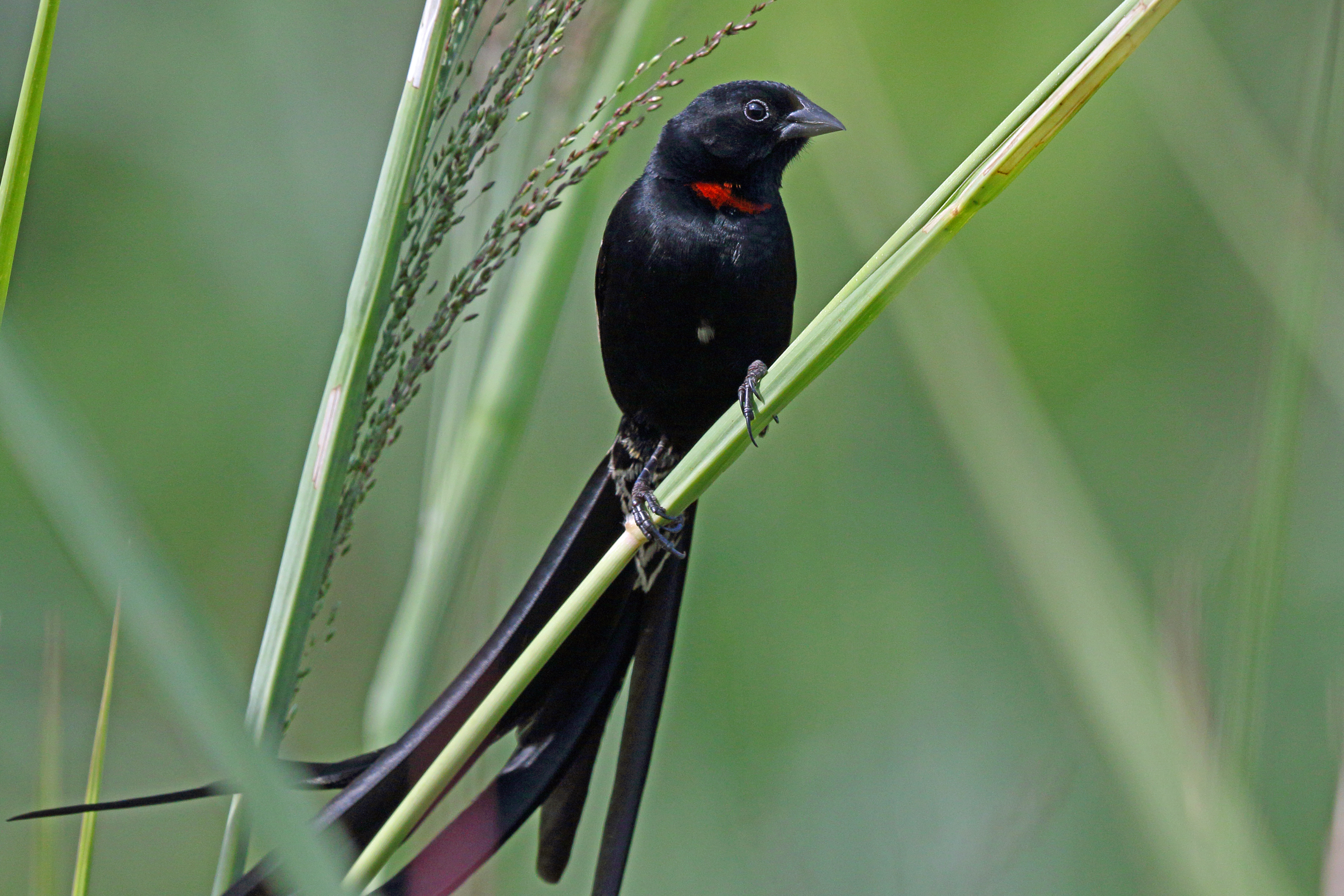
- Male in breeding plumage

Conservation status
- Least Concern (IUCN 3.1)

Scientific classification
- Kingdom: Animalia
- Phylum: Chordata
- Class: Aves
- Order: Passeriformes
- Family: Ploceidae
- Genus: Euplectes
- Species: E. ardens

Binomial name
- Euplectes ardens (Boddaert, 1783)

= Red-collared widowbird =

Species of bird

The red-collared widowbird (Euplectes ardens) is a species of bird in the family Ploceidae. Red-collared widowbirds are found in grasslands and bush clearings in western and southern Africa. They are known for their long tails and brilliant red badges, both of which act as sexual ornaments. They are often associated with other widowbird and bishop species. They are polygynous, where males acquisition of territory is an important determinant in their access to mates. Red-collared widowbirds have a wide range and there is little concern in terms of conservation status.

== Taxonomy ==
The red-collared widowbird was described by the French polymath Georges-Louis Leclerc, Comte de Buffon in 1779 in his Histoire Naturelle des Oiseaux from a specimen collected in the Cape of Good Hope region of South Africa. The bird was also illustrated in a hand-coloured plate engraved by François-Nicolas Martinet in the Planches Enluminées D'Histoire Naturelle which was produced under the supervision of Edme-Louis Daubenton to accompany Buffon's text. Neither the plate caption nor Buffon's description included a scientific name but in 1783 the Dutch naturalist Pieter Boddaert coined the binomial name Fringilla ardens in his catalogue of the Planches Enluminées. The red-collared widowbird is now one of 17 species placed in the genus Euplectes that was introduced by the English naturalist William Swainson in 1829. The genus name combines the Ancient Greek eu "fine" or "good" and the Neo-Latin plectes "weaver". The specific ardens is Latin for "burning" or "glowing".

Traditionally, Euplectes is thought to contain two clades, with the bishops in one clade and the widowbirds in another. However, molecular evidence suggests that the red-collared widowbird is actually a long-tailed bishop rather than a true widowbird. In captivity, they have been successfully bred with southern red bishop, yellow-mantled widowbird, fan-tailed widowbird, and black-winged red bishop.

The red-collared widowbird was formerly considered to be conspecific with the red-cowled widowbird (Euplectes latica). The red-cowled widowbird is now treated as a separate species as it has more red in the plumage and the tail length of a male in breeding plumage is shorter.

== Description ==
Similar to other widowbirds, male red-collared widowbirds have both seasonal and sexual dimorphism. Males are about 25 cm (9.8 in) in length while females are only 13 centimeters. A similar trend is seen with weight, where males range from 20 to 26 g (0.71 to 0.92 oz) and females are only between 16 and 22 grams. During non-breeding seasons, the male plumage is brown, while in breeding season, October to April, they have black plumage with a long tail, approximately 22 cm, and crescent-shaped carotenoid based chest patch. There is significant variation in brightness, hue, and chroma of the carotenoid badges. In contrast, females and subadults, like nonbreeding males, are streaky dull brown with a short tail, approximately 4 cm. Nonbreeding males, however, retain their black tails, while females and subadults' tails are dark-brown.

== Distribution and habitat ==
Red-collared widowbirds are found throughout Eastern and Southern Africa. While their habitats are varied, they are often found in open grasslands, agricultural areas, clearings in forests, and on slopes with limited tree coverage.

== Behavior and ecology ==
=== Diet ===
Red-collared widowbirds feed on seeds of sorghum and other grass seeds. They also feed on nectar, small berries, and insects, specifically ants, caterpillars, and termites. They often form large roosts, with between 50 and 100 individuals, which feed together on the ground. These roosts included breeding males. They are often formed with association with other species, like red-billed quelea, fan-tailed widowbird, southern red bishop, white-winged widowbird, and yellow bishop.

=== Breeding and mating systems ===
Typical of polygynous species, male red-collared widowbirds do not provide parental care. In fact, the only resources males provide are potential nest sites in their territories. They are different from other Euplectes species in that the males use only a simple nest ring in courtship and the females build and position the actual nests. The nests are usually oval in shape and the females line the nests with grass. Females continue to add to the nest during the incubation. Old nests are often occupied by zebra waxbills. There are usually between 2 and 4 eggs in a clutch, each egg being greyish or blue-green, with brown speckles. The incubation period, done only by the female, is between 12 and 15 days. Females also do all of the feeding, primarily via regurgitation, during the nestling period for the offspring, which is between 14 and 17 days. The nests are commonly parasitized by Diederik cuckoos.

Because they are offering no other gifts, it is very important for the males to establish an exclusive territory at the beginning of the breeding season to ensure successful mating. Males aggressively defend their territories from intruders. There is no difference in costs or benefits between females who choose unmated males, monogamy, and females who settle with mated males, polygyny. Females may gain indirect benefits of picking higher quality males by producing higher-quality offspring, without suffering costs of shared territories.

=== Sexual ornaments ===
==== Tails ====
During prenuptial moulting, prior to the breeding season, the males replace their non-breeding feathers. Males that hold territory have shorter tails and carotenoid collars that are 40% larger than nonbreeding floating males . The red collar is for male-male competition, while female choice is based on tail length. Tail length is negatively correlated with carotenoid signal. Also, looking at body size and condition, this accounts for 55% of the variation in tail length. Body size may play a role in the variation of size and redness of both territorial and floater males. Female preference for long tails was first observed in long-tailed widowbirds, and subsequently in Jackson's widowbird and the red-collared widowbird. Tail length explains 47% of the male's reproductive success, indicating the strength of this sexual ornament. Tail symmetry, however, does not have an effect on mating success. In the red-collared widowbird there is a strong trade-off between carotenoid coloration, which is an agonistic signal and tail length, which is an epigamic signal, directly attracting females. These are both costly ornaments that are maintained through multiple receivers.

==== Plumage ====
The red-collared widowbird has one of the highest measured plumage carotenoid concentrations in birds. There is a high presence of lutein and zeaxanthin in the feathers, which is consistent with their high dietary consumption of grass seeds. There is a carotenoid basis of 'redness' observed in the bird, and studies suggest that its color production is due to enzymatic conversion of dietary pigments into red keto-carotenoids, a costly process. The red collar functions as a dominance signal, which was supported experimentally through manipulation of the badges. The experiment showed that red-collared males dominated orange males, which in turn dominated brown and blue collared males. Furthermore, with additional manipulation of badges, males with enlarged red, enlarged orange, and reduced red collars obtained territories, while those with reduced orange and blackened or removed collars failed to establish or maintain territories. Lastly, males with reduced signals defended smaller territories, had more intruders, and spent more time, thus increased cost, on aggressive interactions. Collectively, these observations led to the conclusion that redness, and to a lesser degree size, indicate dominance status and fighting ability in male contests.

Fluctuating asymmetry is a population phenomenon of random deviation in a morphological trait. Some researchers think that fluctuating asymmetry reflect an indirect measure of fitness. This is because sexual ornaments are under intense directional selection. The sexual ornament displayed, the degree of fluctuating asymmetry, reflects the male's ability to deal with environmental and genetic stress, thus as an observer, there is a compromise in males between tail length and symmetry. The tail length itself is the strongest predictor of mating success. However, when the tails were experimentally manipulated, comparing a shortened tail to the control, these males had equal success in acquiring territory with no difference in size or quality. The long-tailed controls spent less time flying and performing courtship displays and they attracted higher quality and more nesting females compared to short-tailed males.

Demonstrating the high cost of the long tail, the control birds with longer tails showed a more significant decline in condition, measured by relative body mass, compared to the birds with shorter tailed birds. Additionally, longer tails are aerodynamically costly, hindering flying ability by increasing drag. Both the short tailed and control residents have declined condition compared to the floaters, the males who did not establish territories, which suggests an interaction between tail lengths and there is high cost of territory acquisition, defense, and courtship displays.

==== Signals ====
To explain the existence of multiple handicap signals, multiple receiver hypothesis has been proposed. In an environment, rivals and mates potentially assess different signals, thus making more than one ornament maintain stable condition-dependent signals, reflecting different qualities or associated costs. These signals are maintained because they target different receivers and reflect different aspects of fitness. This is extended to explain increasing complexity of signals, where different receivers are receptive to different aspects of the same signal. In the case of the red-collared widowbird, the elongated tail addresses female choice, while the red carotenoid badge addresses aggressive male competition over territory.

== Status ==
The red-collared widowbirds are not considered to be globally threatened. They have a very wide range and are found commonly in many regions. They can be found in Kruger National Park, located in South Africa, with a large population of an estimated 2000 individuals. Additionally, the species is found in South and Central Mozambique with approximately 11,000 individuals.
