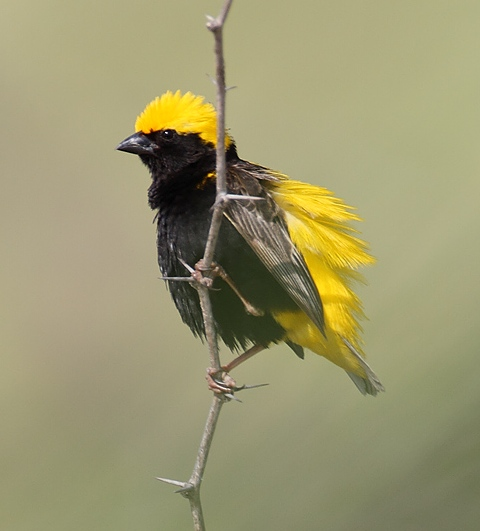

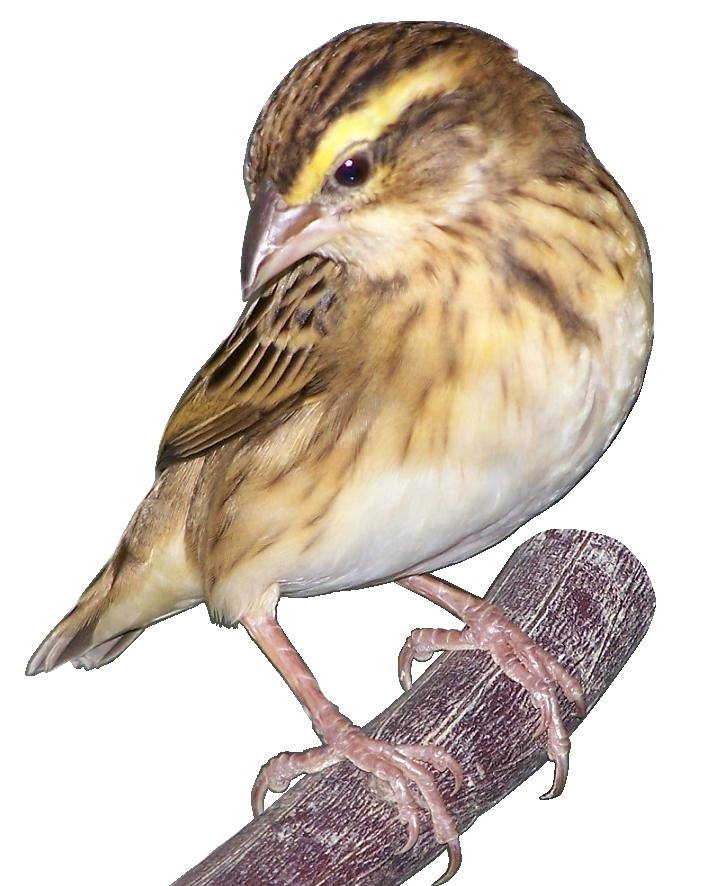
- A breeding male (E. afer subsp. taha) displaying near Lake Baringo, Kenya, and a captive female (nominate race)

Conservation status
- Least Concern (IUCN 3.1)

Scientific classification
- Kingdom: Animalia
- Phylum: Chordata
- Class: Aves
- Order: Passeriformes
- Family: Ploceidae
- Genus: Euplectes
- Species: E. afer

Binomial name
- Euplectes afer (Gmelin, 1789)

Synonyms
- Taha afer

= Yellow-crowned bishop =

Species of bird

The yellow-crowned bishop (Euplectes afer) is a species of passerine bird in the family Ploceidae native to Africa south of the Sahara. It is highly sexually dimorphic in its breeding season, during which the male adopts a distinctive yellow and black plumage, contrasting with the female's predominantly brown coloration. Four subspecies are recognised.

== Taxonomy ==
The yellow-crowned bishop was formally described in 1789 by the German naturalist Johann Friedrich Gmelin in his revised and expanded edition of Carl Linnaeus's Systema Naturae. He placed it with the crossbills in the genus Loxia and coined the binomial name Loxia afra. The specific epithet is from Latin afer meaning "Africa". Gmelin based his account on the "Black-bellied grossbeak" that had been described and illustrated in 1776 by the English naturalist Peter Brown. Gmelin specified the location as Africa but this was restricted to Senegal by Claude Grant and Cyril Mackworth-Praed in 1944. The yellow-crowned bishop is now one of 18 species placed in the genus Euplectes that was introduced in 1829 by the English naturalist William Swainson.

A molecular genetic study published in 2019 found that within the genus Euplectes, the golden-backed bishop (Euplectes aureus) branched off first and this was followed by the yellow-crowned bishop. Alternate common names include: golden bishop, Napoleon bishop, Napoleon weaver, black-winged golden bishop, goudgeelvink (in Afrikaans), Napoleonwever (in Dutch), euplecte vorabé (in French), Napoleonweber (in German), and obispo coronigualdo (in Spanish).

Four subspecies are recognised:

- E. a. strictus Hartlaub, 1857 – central Ethiopia
- E. a. afer (Gmelin, JF, 1789) – Mauritania, Senegal and Gambia to west Sudan, DR Congo and northwest Angola
- E. a. ladoensis Reichenow, 1885 – south Sudan and southwest Ethiopia to north Tanzania
- E. a. taha Smith, A, 1836 – southwest Angola, Zambia and southwest Tanzania to South Africa

== Description ==
The yellow-crowned bishop is 95 to 105 mm (3.7–4.1 in) in length and 15 g (0.53 oz) in weight. During the breeding season it is sexually dimorphic — that is, the observable characteristics of the males become more apparent. During the breeding season, the male has distinctive golden yellow and black plumage. The bill of both sexes is short and conical. The color of the male's bill is black during breeding season; by contrast, during non-breeding season, the male's bill is horn in color, as is the female's. The legs and feet are pinkish brown. The male has a black lower face, throat, breast and belly, a wide black collar on the back of the neck, and a brilliant yellow crown, forehead, and hindcrown. There is a yellow patch on the shoulder, and the rump and back are yellow. The wings and tail are brown. During non-breeding seasons the male plumage looks like the female plumage. The female yellow-crowned bishop has pale brown upperparts, with darker streaking. The eyebrow is paler and the underparts are off-white with fine dark streaks on the breast and flanks.

The male in breeding plumage resembles the yellow bishop, but the latter species is larger and lacks the yellow crown. Non-breeding males and females can be confused with those of the southern red bishop, but have white rather than the buff-coloured underparts of the latter.

== Distribution and habitat ==
The yellow-crowned bishop is native to the African countries of: Angola, Benin, Botswana, Burkina Faso, Cameroon, Central African Republic, Chad, RCongo, DRCongo, Ivory Coast, Ethiopia, Gabon, Gambia, Ghana, Guinea, Guinea-Bissau, Kenya, Lesotho, Liberia, Mali, Mauritania, Mozambique, Namibia, Niger, Nigeria, Senegal, Sierra Leone, South Africa, Sudan, Tanzania, Togo, Uganda, Zambia, and Zimbabwe. It has been introduced in the following countries: Jamaica, Japan, Puerto Rico, Portugal, Spain, and Venezuela. Escaped males have been noted in southern California, where they defended territories, although it is unknown if they still are present in the area. It prefers habitats such as grasslands, vleis, and pans. It likes wheat and sorghum fields, and weedy vegetation along wetlands.

== Behaviour ==
The yellow-crowned bishop eats insects, grain, and seeds. It lives in flocks with both males and females. In non-breeding seasons the flocks may contain weavers and sparrows. The call is a "high-pitched, rasping, buzzing swizzling, somewhat insect-like: zzzzzzz, zzit, zzit, zzzz". Nesting is November–May, peaking from December–March, and males are polygynous, but the males do not breed in colonies. Each male will build two or more oval nests with a top opening, attracting a female to each nest by flaring their yellow feathers and display flights. Yellow-crowned bishop are gregarious and nomadic, wandering to breeding areas in response to rainfall. Nests are built among standing stems of grasses or sedges or shrubs. Bent over stems of live grass help hide the nest. The female will lay from two to four white eggs. Egg incubation is done solely by the females and lasts 12–14 days. Newborn chicks leave the nest after 11–13 days and are fully independent after an additional five weeks.

== Gallery ==
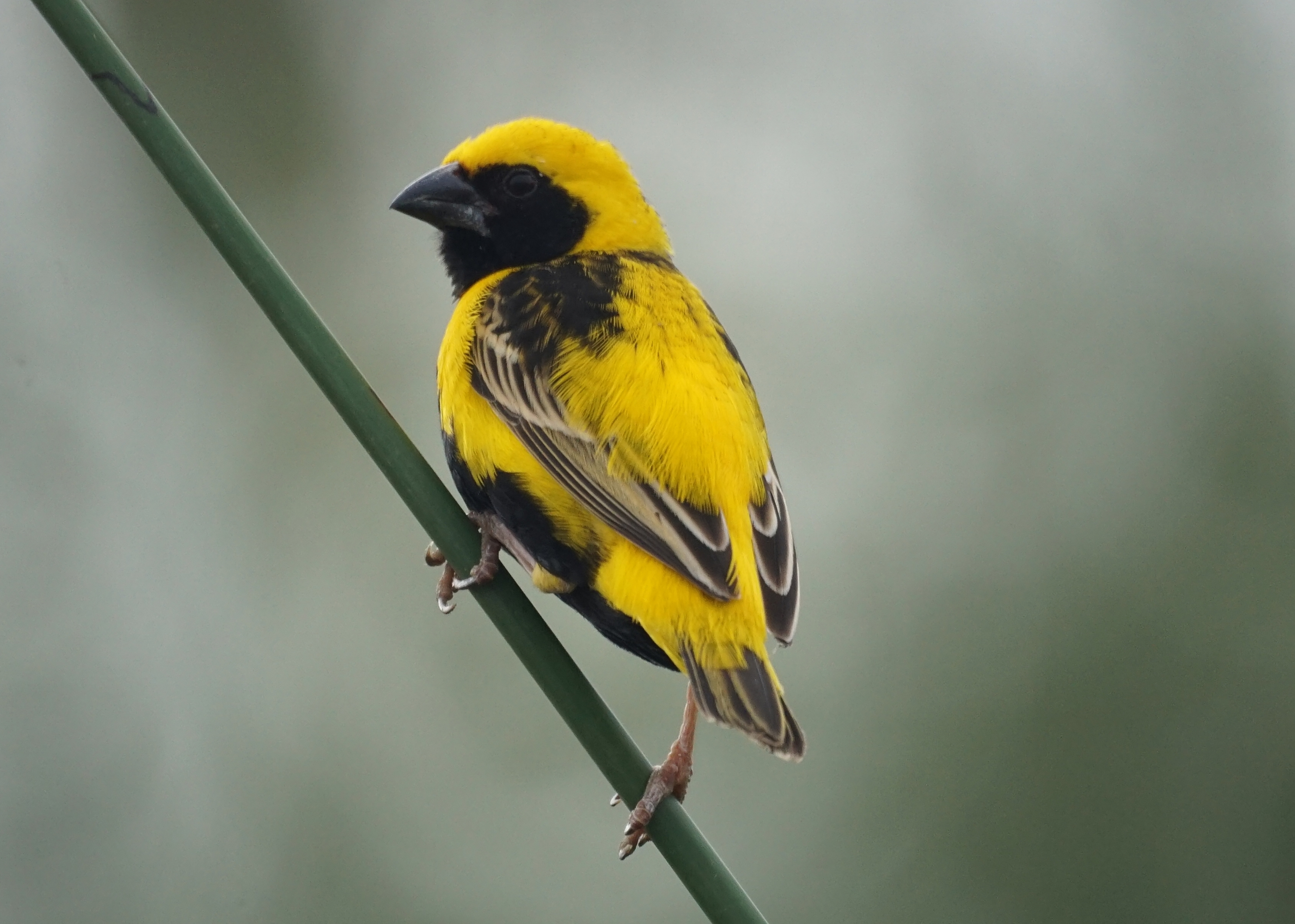
E. a. afer breeding male (J.F.Gmelin, 1789) in Irvine, California, where exotic

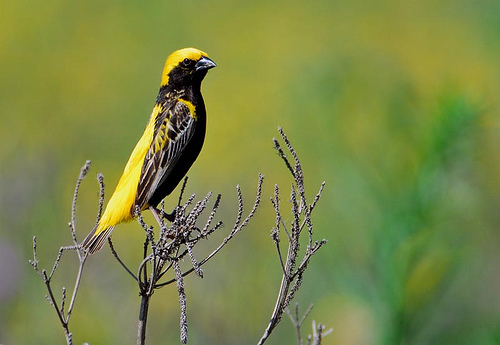
E. a. strictus breeding male, G.Hartlaub, 1857, in the Ethiopian Highlands

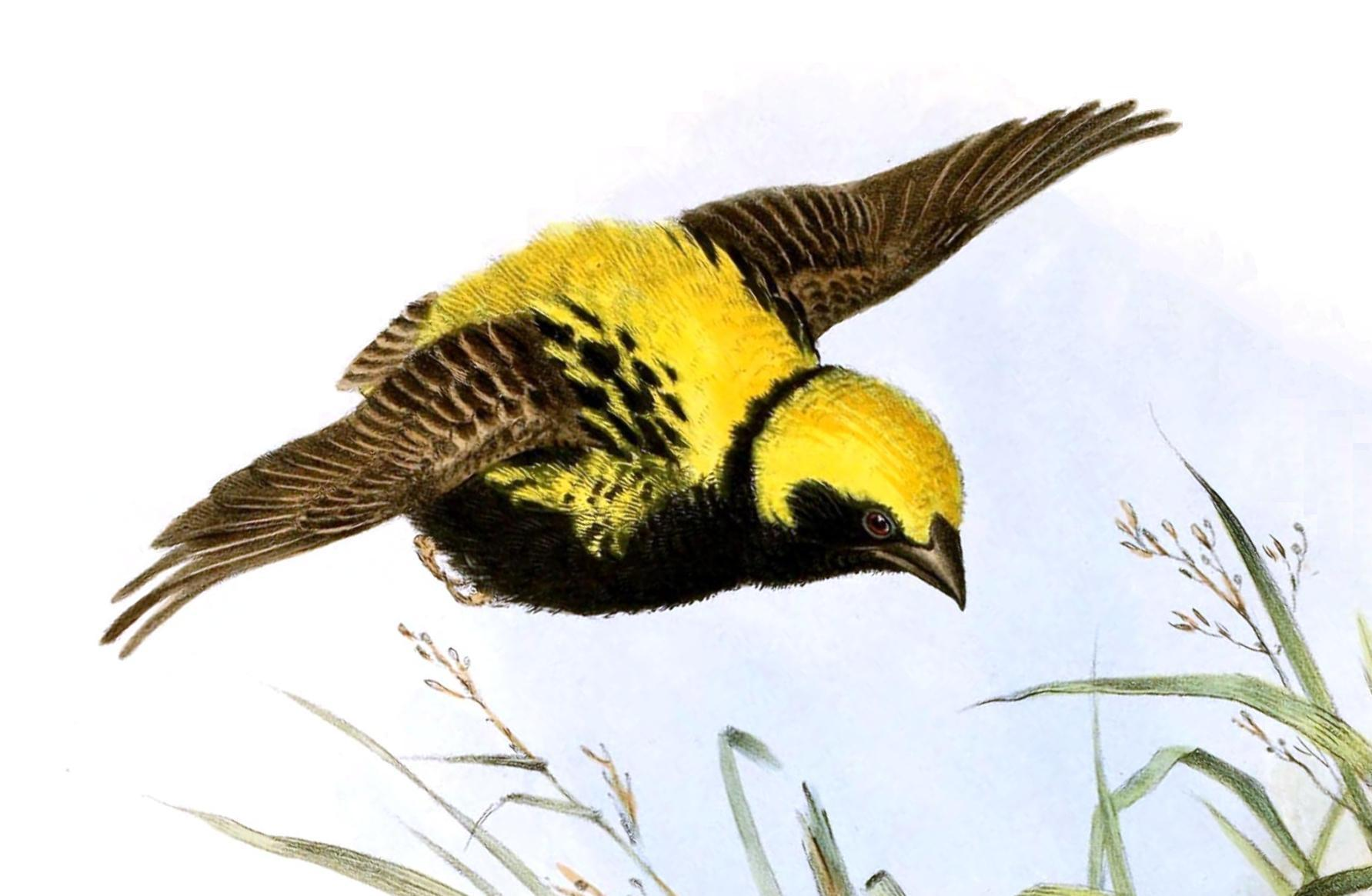
E. a. ladoensis breeding male (Reichenow, 1885) of the eastern tropics. The race is usually subsumed in E. a. taha, Smith, 1836
