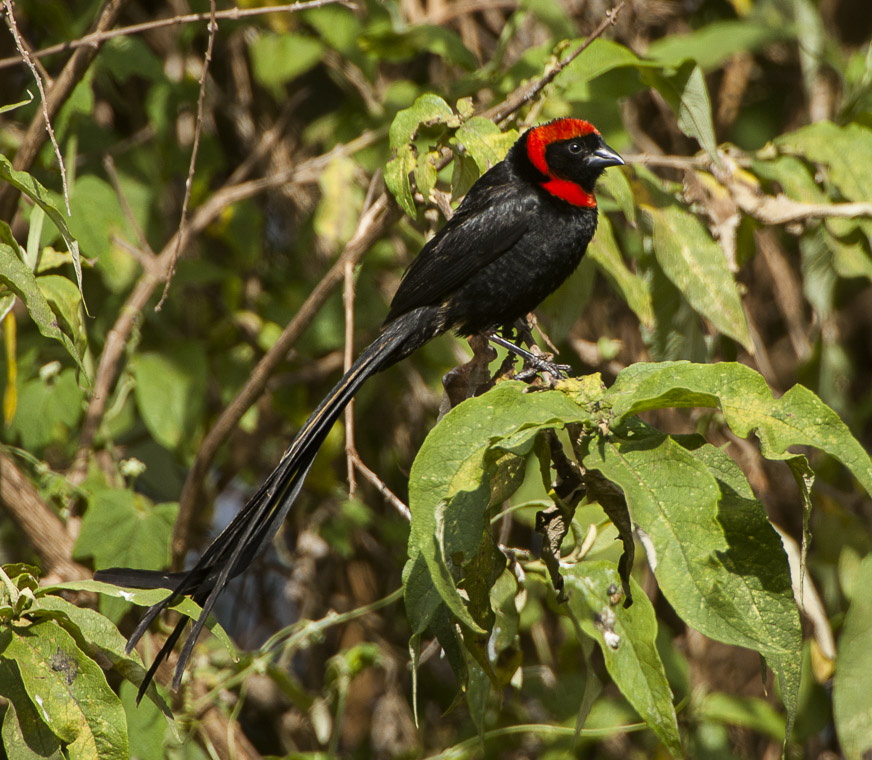
- Male of subspecies E. l. suahelicus in Tanzania

Conservation status
- Least Concern (IUCN 3.1)

Scientific classification
- Kingdom: Animalia
- Phylum: Chordata
- Class: Aves
- Order: Passeriformes
- Family: Ploceidae
- Genus: Euplectes
- Species: E. laticauda

Binomial name
- Euplectes laticauda (Lichtenstein, MHC, 1823)

= Red-cowled widowbird =

Species of bird

The red-cowled widowbird (Euplectes laticauda) is a species of bird in the weaver family Ploceidae. Red-cowled widowbirds are found in grasslands and bush clearings in East Africa. They are known for their long tails and brilliant red badges, both which act as sexual ornaments. They are often associated with other widowbird and bishop species. They are polygynous, where males acquisition of territory is an important determinant in their access to mates. Red-cowled widowbirds have a wide range and there is little concern in terms of conservation status.

The red-cowled widowbird was formerly considered as conspecific with the red-collared widowbird (Euplectes ardens). The species were split based on the substantial difference in plumage and the tail lengths of males when in breeding plumage.

Two subspecies are recognised:

- E. l. laticauda (Lichtenstein, MHC, 1823) – southeast Sudan, Eritrea and Ethiopia
- E. l. suahelicus (Van Someren, 1921) – central Kenya to north Tanzania
