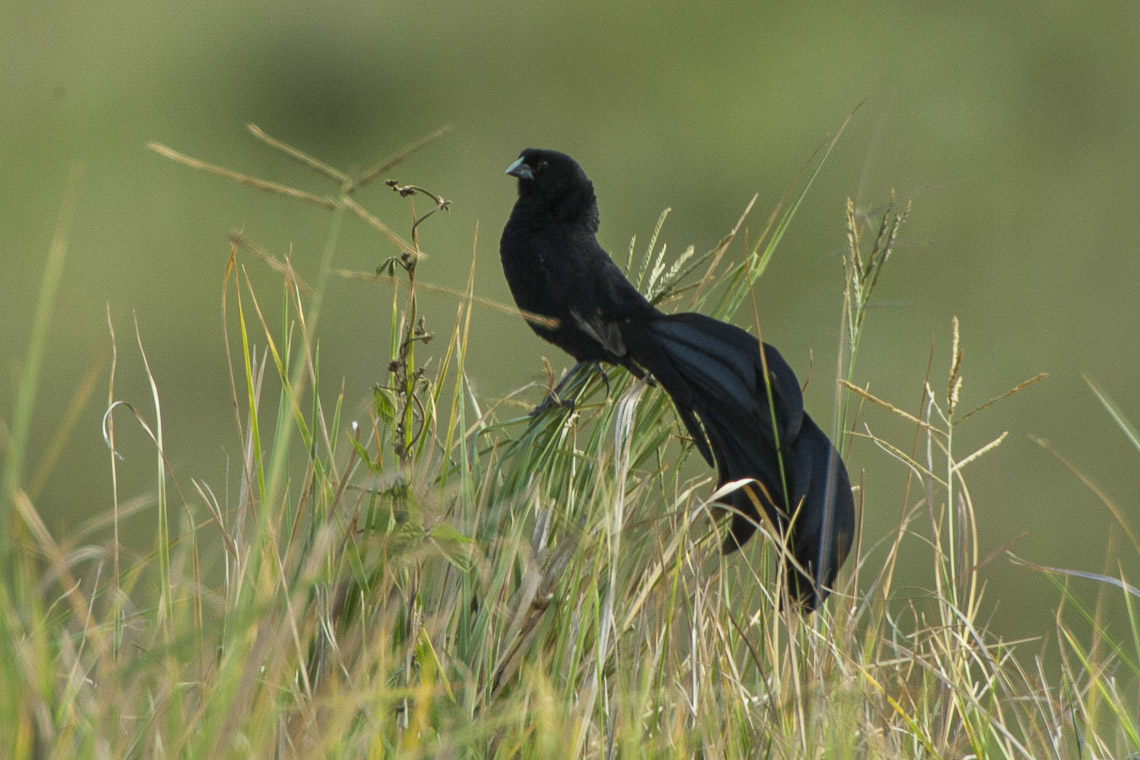

Conservation status
- Near Threatened (IUCN 3.1)

Scientific classification
- Kingdom: Animalia
- Phylum: Chordata
- Class: Aves
- Order: Passeriformes
- Family: Ploceidae
- Genus: Euplectes
- Species: E. jacksoni

Binomial name
- Euplectes jacksoni (Sharpe, 1891)

= Jackson's widowbird =

Species of bird

Jackson's widowbird (Euplectes jacksoni) is a species of bird in the family Ploceidae. It is found in Kenya and Tanzania. Its natural habitats are subtropical or tropical high-altitude grassland and arable land. It is threatened by habitat loss.
