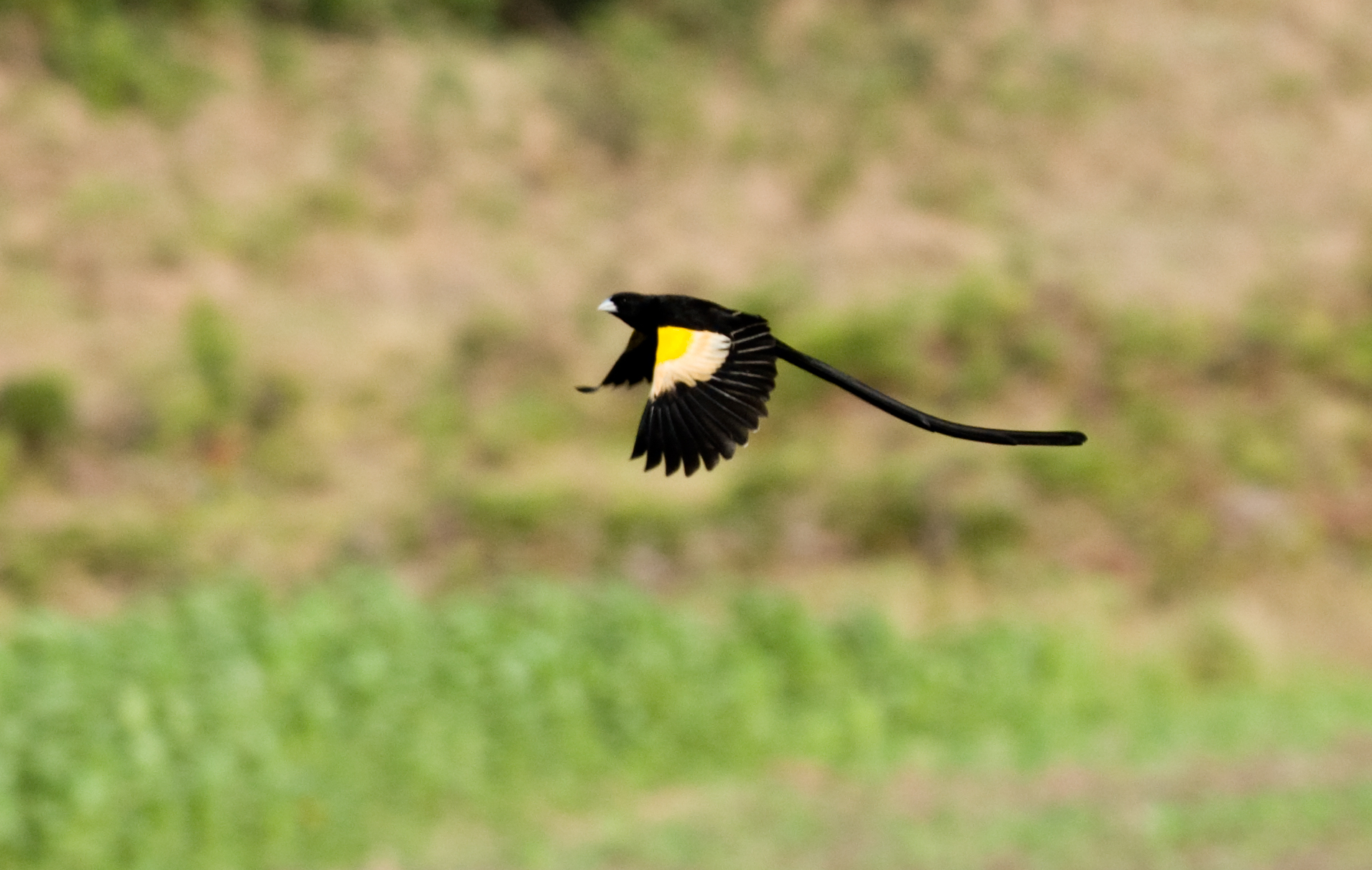

Conservation status
- Least Concern (IUCN 3.1)

Scientific classification
- Kingdom: Animalia
- Phylum: Chordata
- Class: Aves
- Order: Passeriformes
- Family: Ploceidae
- Genus: Euplectes
- Species: E. psammacromius

Binomial name
- Euplectes psammacromius (Reichenow, 1900)

Synonyms
- Pentethria psammocromia lapsus

= Montane widowbird =

Species of bird

The montane widowbird (Euplectes psammacromius), also known as the mountain marsh widowbird, is a species of bird in the family Ploceidae, which is native to the eastern Afrotropics.

== Range and habitat ==
It is an endemic resident of the eastern Afromontane grasslands. It occurs in northeast Zambia, northern Malawi and the highlands of southwestern Tanzania.

== Description ==
Like all widowbirds, the male and female plumages differ prominently during breeding season. In the breeding season males moult into a black breeding plumage, which includes long tail feathers and yellow shoulder patches (these patches retain a discrete appearance during the non-breeding period). Outside the breeding season the sexes are similar in appearance, both having speckled brown and black plumage.

== Behaviour ==
During this period males defend territories in the early morning after sunrise and in the evening before sunset.
