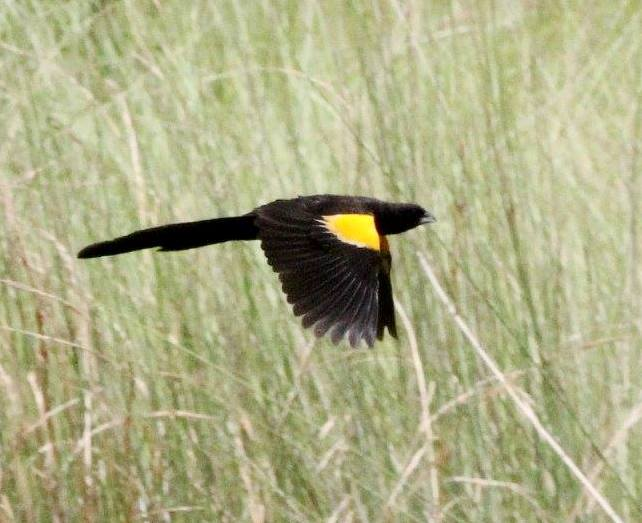
- Male in Angola in breeding plumage
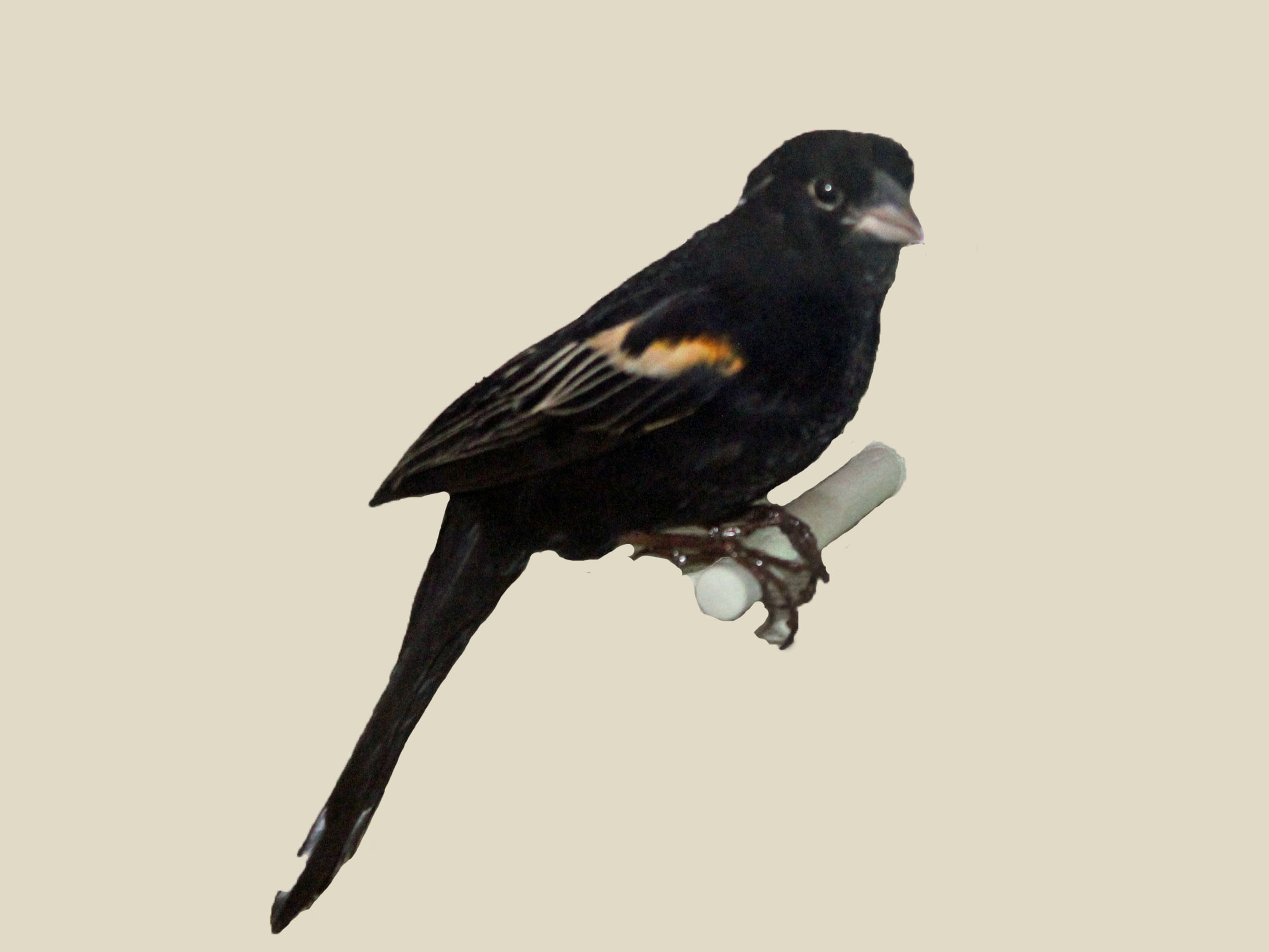
- Specimen at Nairobi National Museum

Conservation status
- Least Concern (IUCN 3.1)

Scientific classification
- Kingdom: Animalia
- Phylum: Chordata
- Class: Aves
- Order: Passeriformes
- Family: Ploceidae
- Genus: Euplectes
- Species: E. hartlaubi

Binomial name
- Euplectes hartlaubi (Barboza du Bocage, 1878)

= Marsh widowbird =

Species of bird

The marsh widowbird or Hartlaub's widowbird (Euplectes hartlaubi) is a bird in the family Ploceidae. The species was first described by José Vicente Barbosa du Bocage in 1878.

== Range ==
It is found in Angola, Cameroon, the Republic of the Congo, the Democratic Republic of the Congo, Gabon, Kenya, Nigeria, Tanzania, Uganda, and Zambia.
