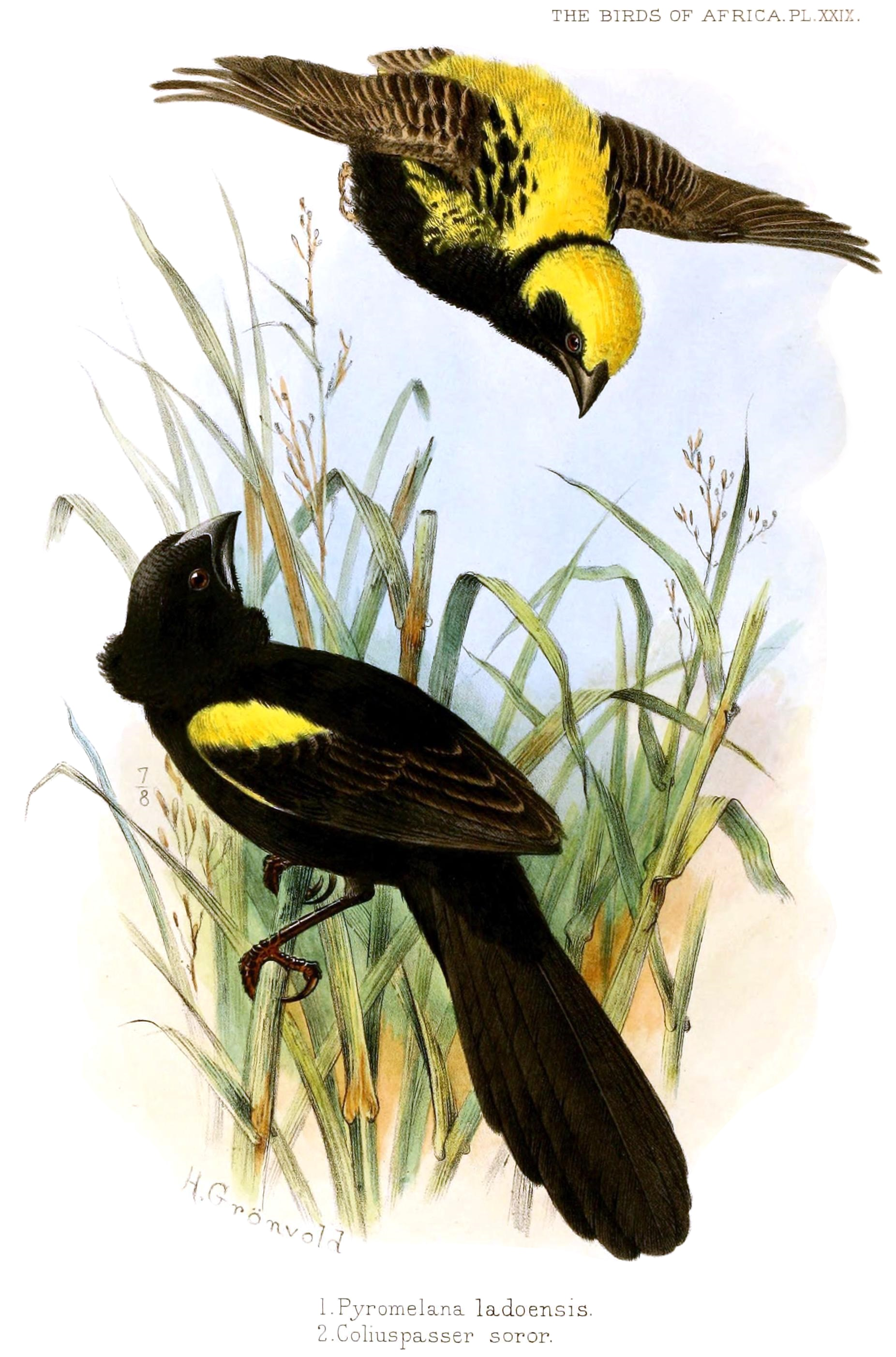
- Euplectes afer ladoensis (above) E. macrourus macrocercus (below)

Scientific classification
- Kingdom: Animalia
- Phylum: Chordata
- Class: Aves
- Order: Passeriformes
- Family: Ploceidae
- Genus: Euplectes; Swainson, 1829

Type species
- Loxia orix Linnaeus, 1758

Species
- See text

= Euplectes =

Genus of weaver birds native to Africa

Euplectes is a genus of passerine bird in the weaver family, Ploceidae, that contains the bishops and widowbirds. They are all native to Africa south of the Sahara. It is believed that all birds in the genus are probably polygynous.

The genus Euplectes was introduced by the English naturalist William Swainson in 1829 with the southern red bishop as the type species. The name combines the Ancient Greek eu meaning "fine" or "good" with the Neo-Latin plectes meaning "weaver". When choosing their mates, females within this genus will often choose males with longer tail lengths, even in species with comparatively shorter tail lengths.

== Species ==
The genus contains the following 19 species.

Image	Scientific name	Common name	Distribution
	Euplectes afer	Yellow-crowned bishop	sparsely distributed across Sub-Saharan Africa
	Euplectes diadematus	Fire-fronted bishop	Kenya, Somalia, and Tanzania
	Euplectes aureus	Golden-backed bishop	western Angola and São Tomé Island
	Euplectes gierowii	Black bishop	Angola, Cameroon, Central African Republic, Republic of the Congo, Democratic Republic of the Congo, Ethiopia, Kenya, South Sudan, Tanzania, and Uganda
	Euplectes nigroventris	Zanzibar red bishop	Kenya, Mozambique, and Tanzania
	Euplectes hordeaceus	Black-winged red bishop	Senegal to Sudan and south to Angola, Tanzania, Zimbabwe and Mozambique
	Euplectes orix	Southern red bishop or red bishop,	north to Angola, southern and eastern parts of the Democratic Republic of Congo, northern Zambia southern Uganda north-east Nigeria and south-west Kenya
	Euplectes franciscanus	Northern red bishop or orange bishop,	Africa south of the Sahara Desert and north of the Equator
	Euplectes capensis	Yellow bishop	Afromontane
	Euplectes axillaris	Fan-tailed widowbird	Angola, Botswana, Burundi, Cameroon, Central African Republic, Chad, Republic of the Congo, DRC, Eswatini, Ethiopia, Kenya, Lesotho, Malawi, Mali, Mozambique, Namibia, Niger, Nigeria, Rwanda, Somalia, South Africa, Sudan, Tanzania, Uganda, Zambia, and Zimbabwe
	Euplectes macroura	Yellow-mantled widowbird	Angola, Benin, Burkina Faso, Burundi, Cameroon, Central African Republic, Chad, Republic of the Congo, Democratic Republic of the Congo, Ivory Coast, Gabon, Gambia, Ghana, Guinea, Guinea-Bissau, Liberia, Malawi, Mali, Mozambique, Niger, Nigeria, Senegal, Sierra Leone, Sudan, Tanzania, Togo, Zambia and Zimbabwe.
	Euplectes hartlaubi	Marsh widowbird	Angola, Cameroon, Republic of the Congo, Democratic Republic of the Congo, Gabon, Kenya, Nigeria, Tanzania, Uganda, and Zambia.
	Euplectes psammacromius	Montane widowbird	northeast Zambia, northern Malawi and the highlands of southwestern Tanzania
	Euplectes albonotatus	White-winged widowbird	Angola, Botswana, Burundi, Central African Republic, the Republic of the Congo, the Democratic Republic of the Congo, Eswatini, Ethiopia, Gabon, Kenya, Malawi, Mozambique, Namibia, Rwanda, São Tomé, South Africa, Sudan, Tanzania, Uganda, Zambia, and Zimbabwe
	Euplectes ardens	Red-collared widowbird	Guinea, inland Sierra Leone, north Liberia, north Ivory Coast, southwest Niger, central and southeast Nigeria, Cameroon, Central African Republic, Democratic Republic of Congo, central and northeast Angola, Uganda, West Kenya, Tanzania, Malawi, northwest and south Mozambique, Eswatini and east South Africa
	Euplectes laticauda	Red-cowled widowbird	Sudan, Eritrea, Ethiopia, Kenya and north Tanzania
	Euplectes progne	Long-tailed widowbird	Angola, Botswana, the Democratic Republic of the Congo, Eswatini, Kenya, Lesotho, South Africa, and Zambia
	Euplectes jacksoni	Jackson's widowbird	Kenya and Tanzania
	Euplectes anomalus	Bob-tailed weaver	Cameroon, Central African Republic, Democratic Republic of the Congo, and Angola

== Aviculture ==
The yellow-crowned bishop and northern red bishop are popular in aviculture.
