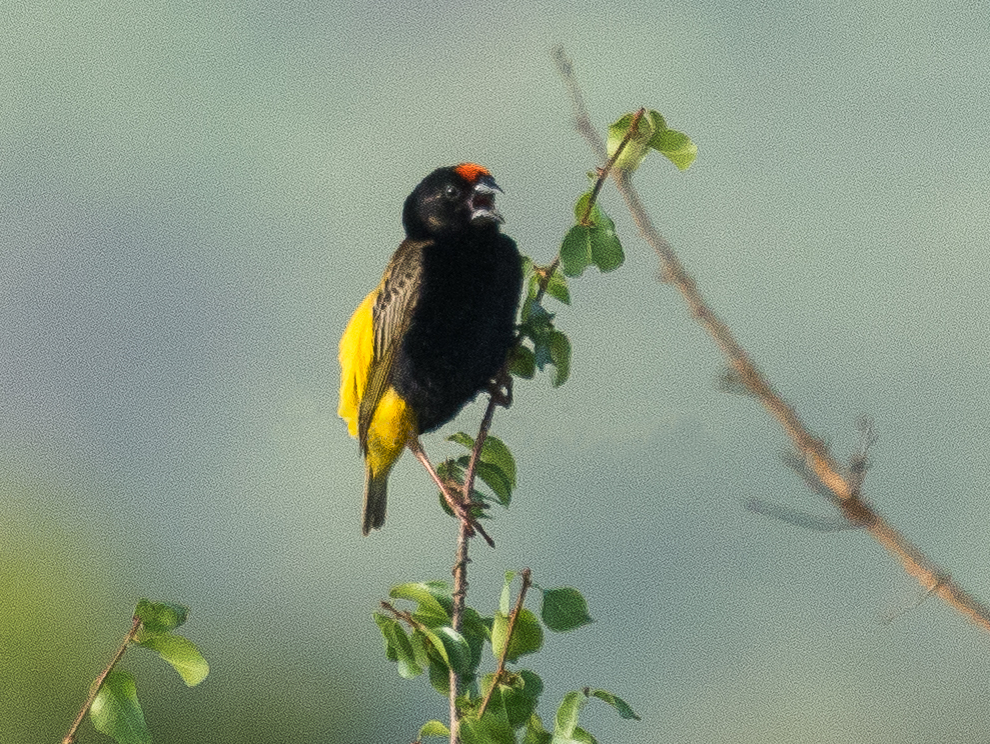

Conservation status
- Least Concern (IUCN 3.1)

Scientific classification
- Kingdom: Animalia
- Phylum: Chordata
- Class: Aves
- Order: Passeriformes
- Family: Ploceidae
- Genus: Euplectes
- Species: E. diadematus

Binomial name
- Euplectes diadematus Fischer & Reichenow, 1878

= Fire-fronted bishop =

Species of bird

The fire-fronted bishop (Euplectes diadematus) is a species of bird in the family Ploceidae. It is found in Kenya, Somalia, and Tanzania.
