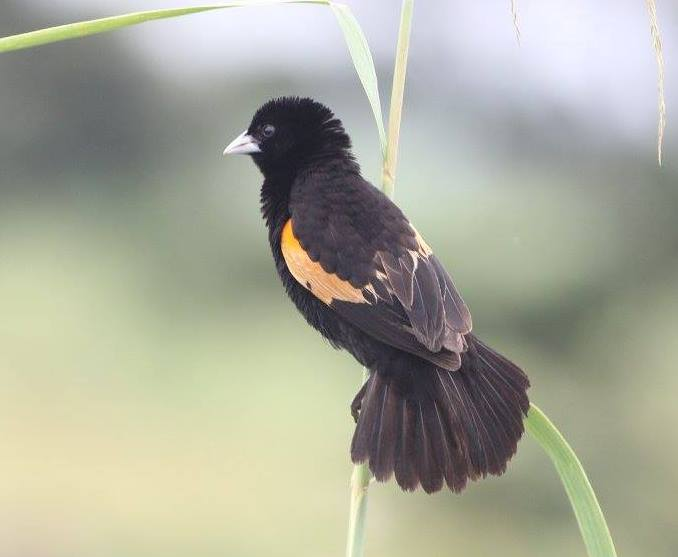

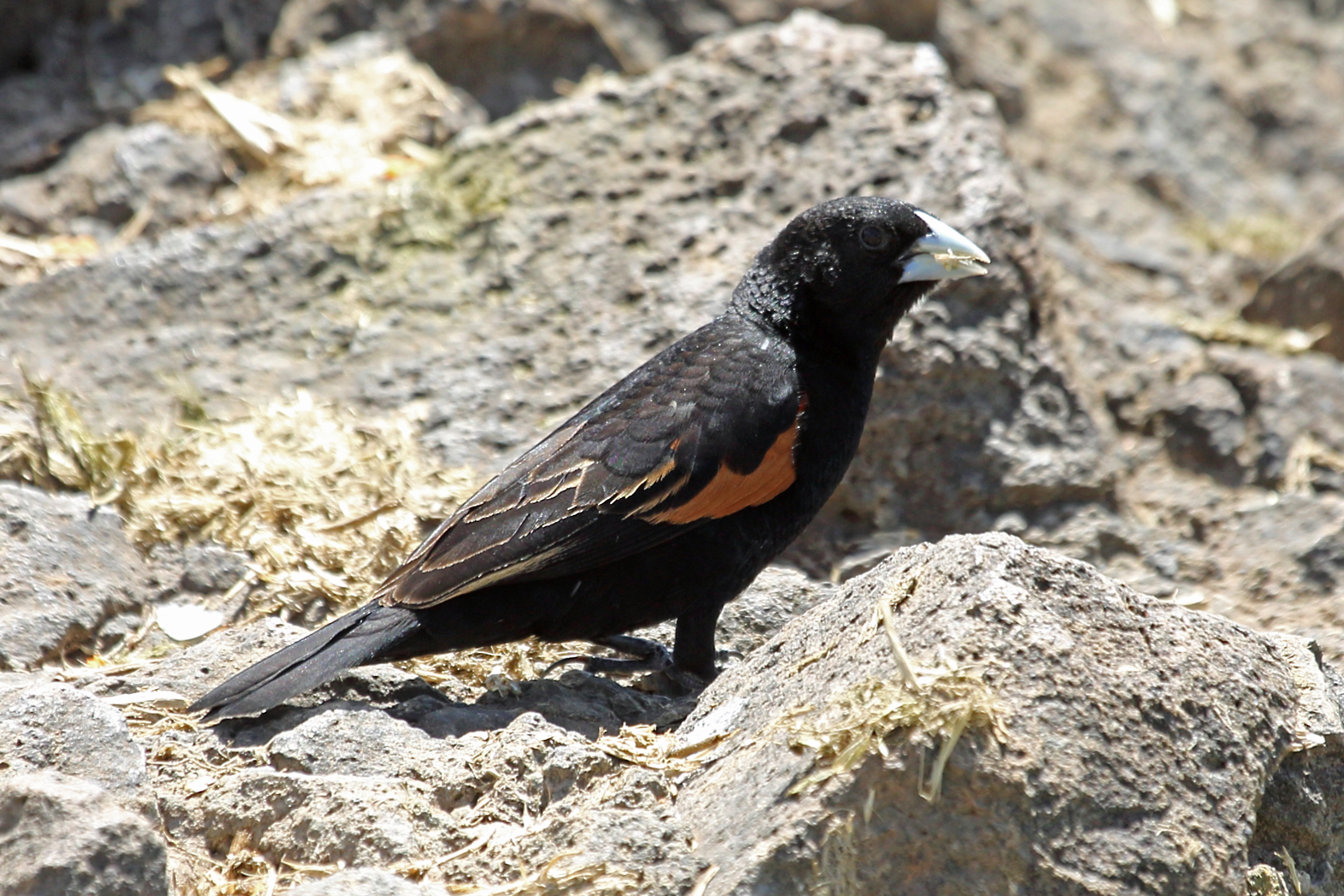
- Breeding males of races E. a. bocagei and E. a. phoeniceus

Conservation status
- Least Concern (IUCN 3.1)

Scientific classification
- Kingdom: Animalia
- Phylum: Chordata
- Class: Aves
- Order: Passeriformes
- Family: Ploceidae
- Genus: Euplectes
- Species: E. axillaris

Binomial name
- Euplectes axillaris (Smith, 1838)

= Fan-tailed widowbird =

Species of bird

The fan-tailed widowbird (Euplectes axillaris), also known as the red-shouldered widowbird, is a species of bird in the family Ploceidae, which is native to grassy and swampy areas of the tropical and subtropical Afrotropics.

== Range ==
It is found in Angola, Botswana, Burundi, Cameroon, Central African Republic, Chad, Republic of the Congo, DRC, Eswatini, Ethiopia, Kenya, Lesotho, Malawi, Mali, Mozambique, Namibia, Niger, Nigeria, Rwanda, Somalia, South Africa, Sudan, Tanzania, Uganda, Zambia, and Zimbabwe.

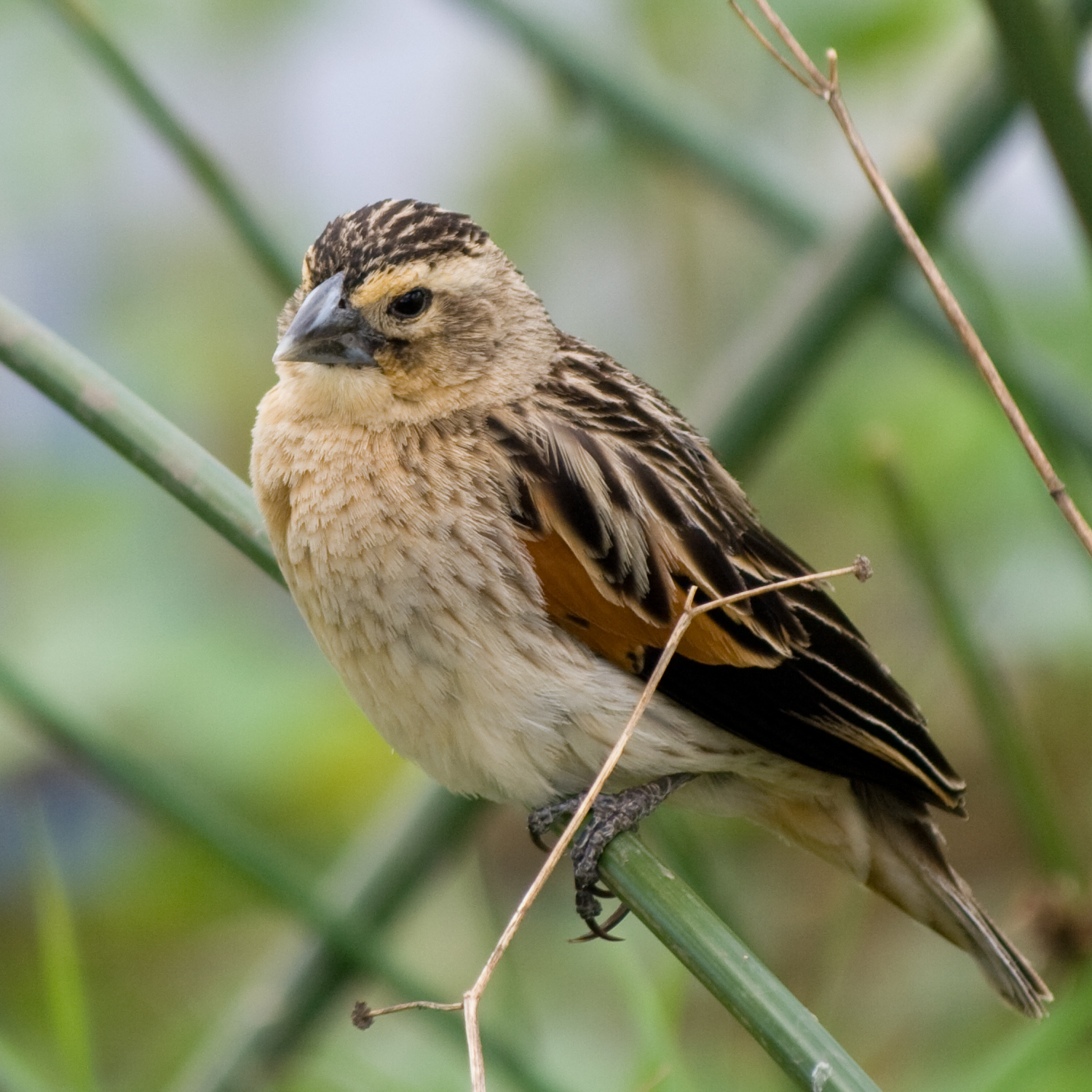
Male E. a. phoeniceus in eclipse plumage

== Races ==
There are five accepted races:

- E. a. subsp. bocagei (Sharpe, 1871) – West Africa from Mali to CAR and DRC, and southwards to the Caprivi Strip, Okavango and upper Zambezi regions.
- E. a. subsp. phoeniceus (Heuglin, 1862) – East Africa (Sudan to upland Kenya, Tanzania, Zambia and Malawi)
- E. a. subsp. traversii (Salvadori, 1888) – Ethiopian Highlands
- E. a. subsp. zanzibaricus (Shelley, 1881) – African east coast (Somalia to Tanzania)
- E. a. subsp. axillaris (A.Smith, 1838) – southeastern Africa (lowland Malawi to eastern South Africa)
