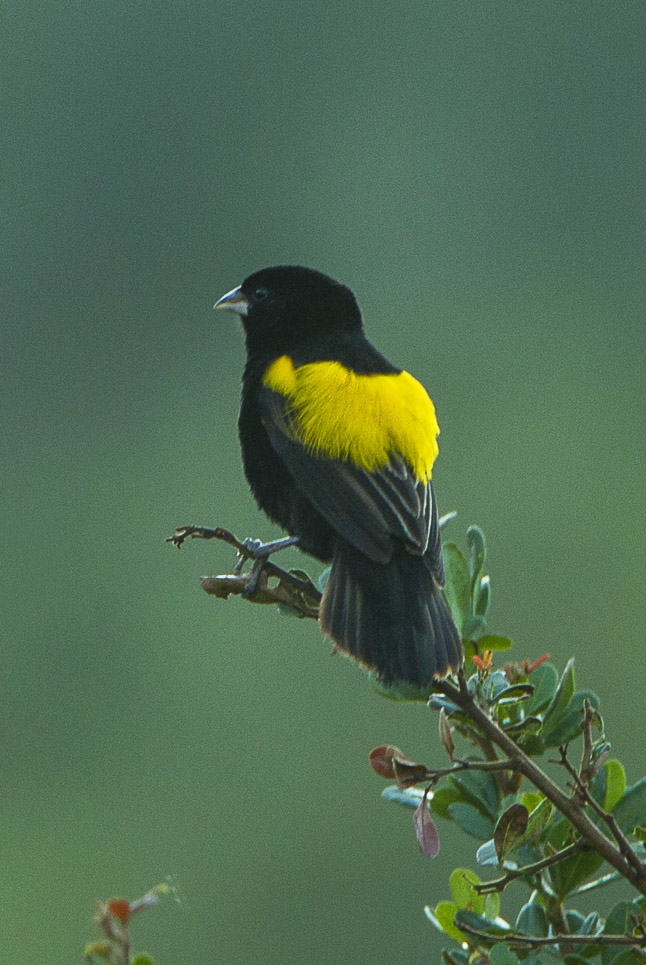
- Male at Aberdare Range, Kenya

Conservation status
- Least Concern (IUCN 3.1)

Scientific classification
- Kingdom: Animalia
- Phylum: Chordata
- Class: Aves
- Order: Passeriformes
- Family: Ploceidae
- Genus: Euplectes
- Species: E. capensis

Binomial name
- Euplectes capensis (Linnaeus, 1766)

Synonyms
- Loxia capensis Linnaeus, 1766

= Yellow bishop =

Species of bird

The yellow bishop (Euplectes capensis), also known as Cape bishop, Cape widow or yellow-rumped widow, is a resident breeding Afromontane bird species.

This common weaver occurs in less arid vegetated areas, such as fynbos, moist grassland and bracken-covered valleys at altitudes from sea level to the Ethiopian Highlands.

== Taxonomy ==
In 1760, the French zoologist Mathurin Jacques Brisson included a description of the yellow bishop in his Ornithologie based on a specimen collected from the Cape of Good Hope. He used the French name Le pinçon du Cap de Bonne Espérance and the Latin Fringilla Capitis Bonae Spei. Although Brisson coined Latin names, these do not conform to the binomial system and are not recognised by the International Commission on Zoological Nomenclature. When in 1766 the Swedish naturalist Carl Linnaeus updated his Systema Naturae for the twelfth edition, he added 240 species that had been previously described by Brisson. One of these was the yellow bishop. Linnaeus included a brief description, coined the binomial name Loxia capensis and cited Brisson's work. The specific name capensis denotes the Cape of Good Hope. This species is now placed in the genus Euplectes that was introduced by the English naturalist William Swainson in 1829 with the southern red bishop as the type species. There are six subspecies.

== Description ==
The yellow bishop is a stocky 15 centimetres (5.9 in) long bird. The breeding male is black apart from his bright yellow lower back, rump, and shoulder patches, and brown edging to the wing feathers. He has a short crest, thick conical black bill, and a relatively short tail. His bill size varies dramatically between races.

In non-breeding plumage, the black plumage is replaced by heavily streaked buffy-brown, and the bill is pale. The yellow shoulders and rump remain, and are a distinction from the female which lacks the contrasting colour patches. The juveniles and females are notoriously difficult to identify in the field, appearing identical to the juveniles and females of several other bishops and widowbirds as well as some seedeaters.

In the breeding season they are usually solitary or in pairs, but the non-breeding yellow bishop is gregarious, often forming flocks with other 'mixed euplectes'.

They feed on seed, grain and some insects.

== Voice ==
Calls include zeet zeet zeet, and a harsh zzzzzzt given by the male in flight. The song of the isolated SW Cameroon phoenicomerus is quite different: a dry rattle followed by swit-err, swit-err.

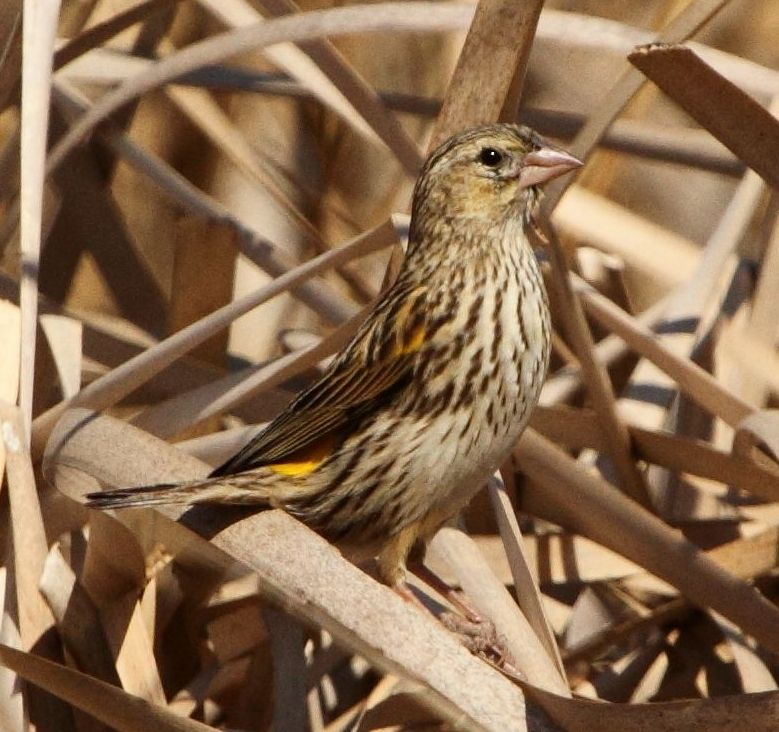
Female in KwaZulu-Natal

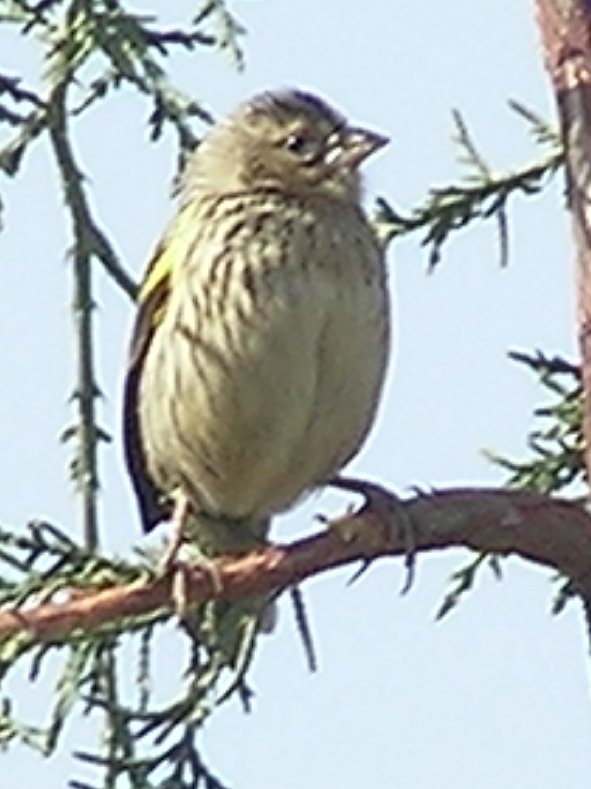
Non-breeding Male in Debre Berhan, Ethiopia

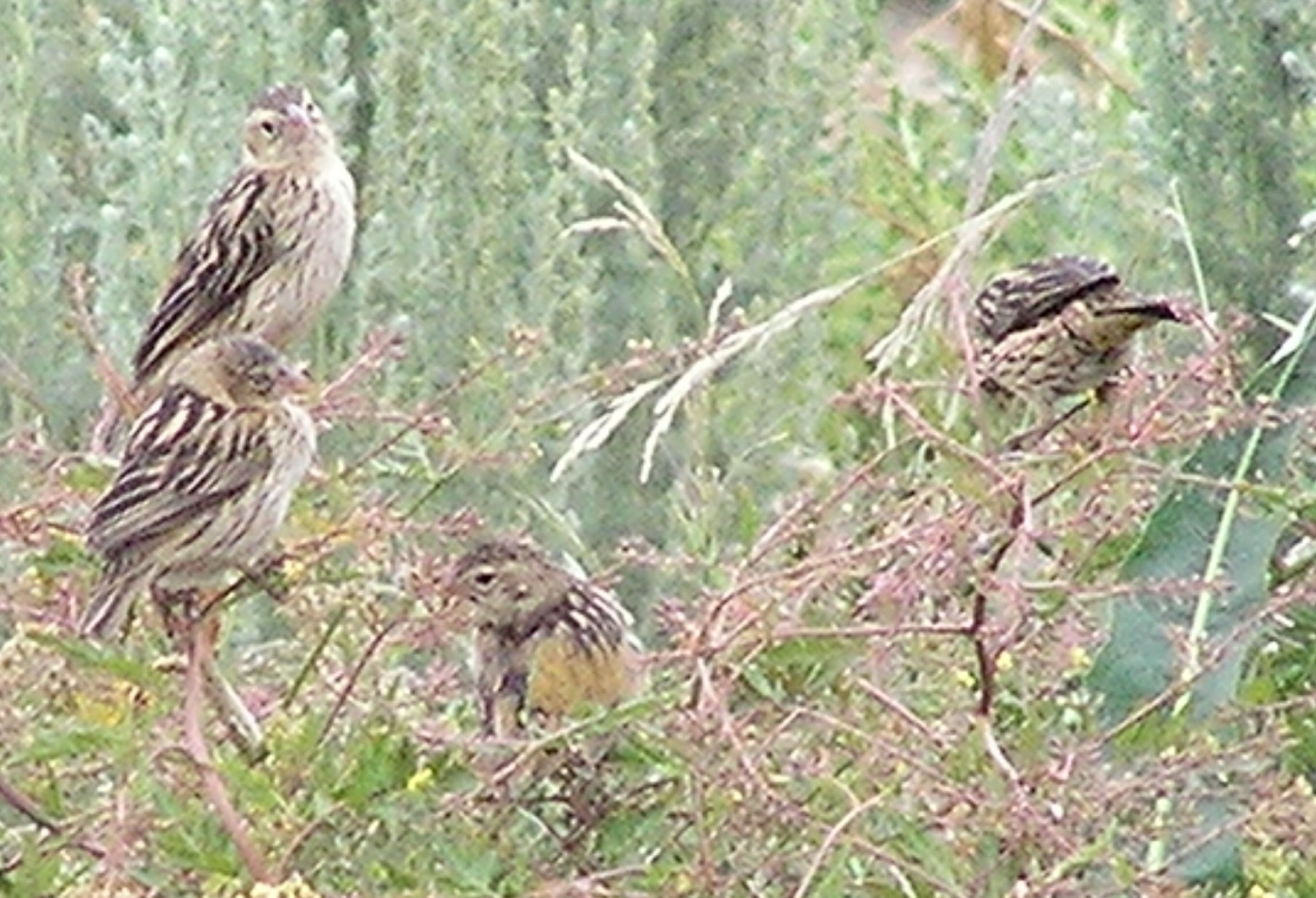
Juveniles in Debre Berhan, Ethiopia

== Cited texts ==
- Sinclair, Ian; Ryan, Peter (2003). Birds of Africa south of the Sahara. Cape Town: Struik.
