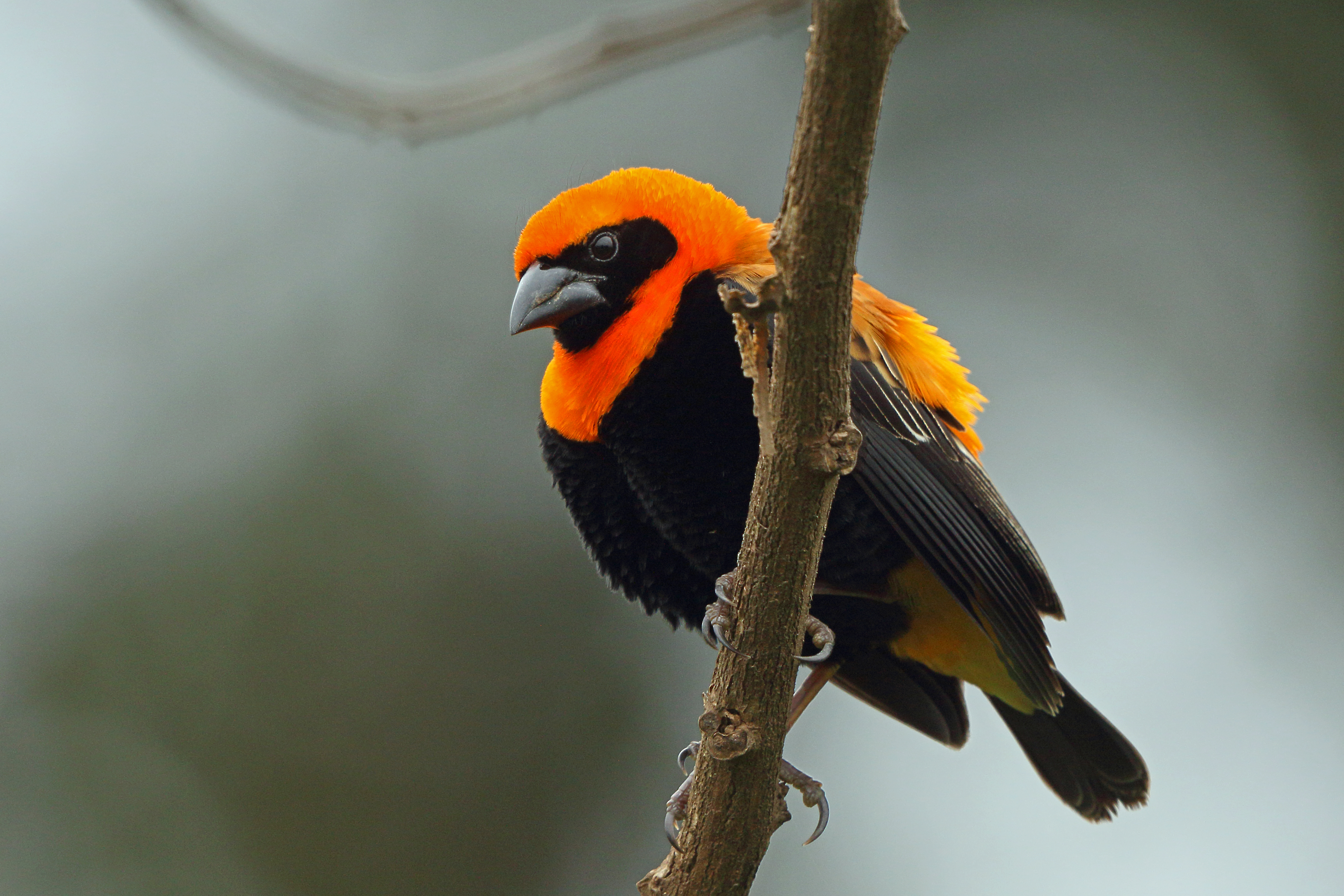
- Breeding plumage of the male
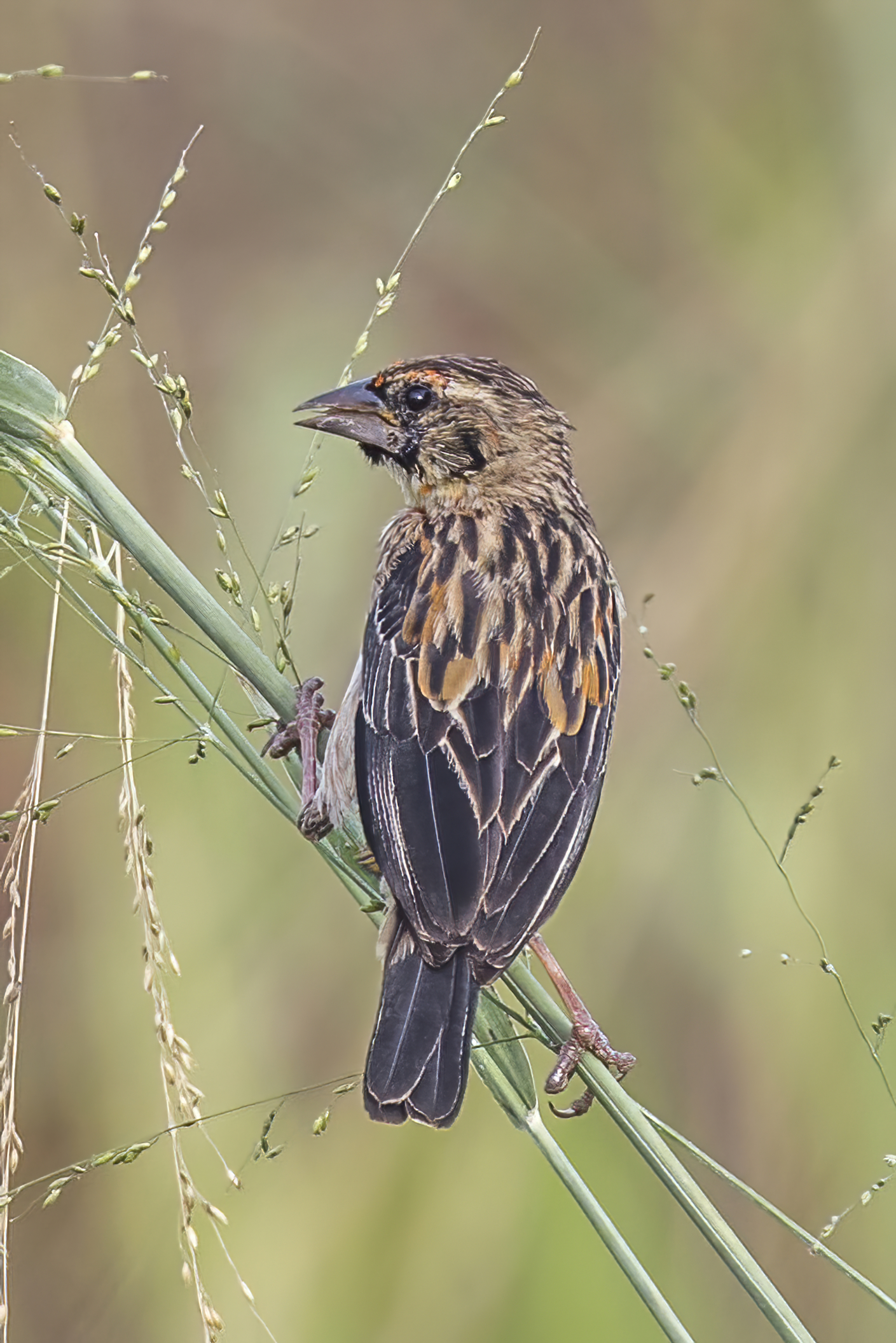
- Non-breeding plumage of male

Conservation status
- Least Concern (IUCN 3.1)

Scientific classification
- Kingdom: Animalia
- Phylum: Chordata
- Class: Aves
- Order: Passeriformes
- Family: Ploceidae
- Genus: Euplectes
- Species: E. hordeaceus

Binomial name
- Euplectes hordeaceus (Linnaeus, 1758)

Synonyms
- Loxia hordeacea Linnaeus, 1758

= Black-winged red bishop =

Species of bird from tropical Africa

The black-winged red bishop (Euplectes hordeaceus), formerly known in southern Africa as the fire-crowned bishop, is a resident breeding bird species in tropical Africa from Senegal to Sudan and south to Angola, Tanzania, Zimbabwe and Mozambique.

== Taxonomy ==
The black-winged red bishop was formally described in 1758 by the Swedish naturalist Carl Linnaeus in the tenth edition of his Systema Naturae under the binomial name Loxia hordeacea. Linnaeus mistakenly specified the type location as India but this has been corrected to Senegal. The specific epithet hordeaceus is Latin meaning "of barley" from hordeum meaning "barley". The black-winged red bishop is now one of 18 species in the genus Euplectes that was introduced in 1829 by the English naturalist William Swainson.

Two subspecies are recognised:

- E. h. hordeaceus (Linnaeus, 1758) – Mauritania, Senegal and Gambia to west Sudan, DR Congo, Tanzania and south to Angola, Zimbabwe and Mozambique
- E. h. craspedopterus Bonaparte, 1850 – south Sudan, southwest Ethiopia, Uganda and west Kenya

== Description ==
The black-winged red bishop is a stocky 13–15 cm (5.1–5.9 in) bird. The breeding male is scarlet apart from his black face, belly and wings and brown tail. The conical bill is thick and black. He displays prominently, singing high-pitched twitters from tall grass, puffing out his feathers or performing a slow hovering display flight.

The non-breeding male is yellow-brown, streaked above and shading to whitish below. It has a whitish supercilium. It resembles non-breeding male northern red bishop, but is darker and has black wings. Females are similar, but paler. Young birds have wider pale fringes on their flight feathers.

== Distribution and habitat ==
This common weaver occurs in a range of open country, especially tall grassland and often near water. It builds a spherical woven nest in tall grass. 2-4 eggs are laid.

It is a gregarious species which feeds on seed, grain and some insects.
