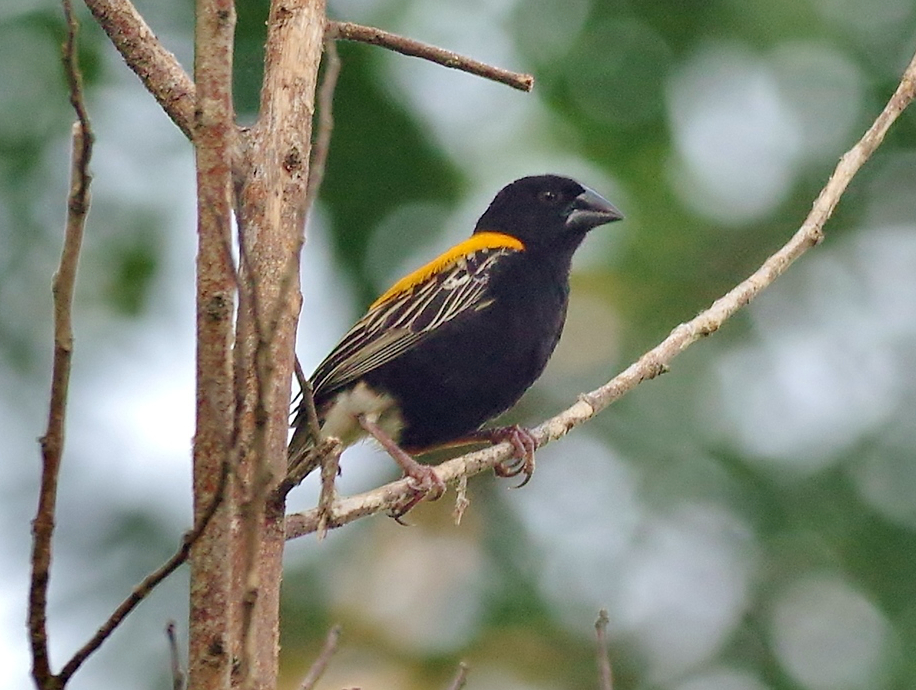

Conservation status
- Least Concern (IUCN 3.1)

Scientific classification
- Kingdom: Animalia
- Phylum: Chordata
- Class: Aves
- Order: Passeriformes
- Family: Ploceidae
- Genus: Euplectes
- Species: E. aureus

Binomial name
- Euplectes aureus (Gmelin, JF, 1789)

= Golden-backed bishop =

Species of bird

The golden-backed bishop (Euplectes aureus) is a species of bird in the family Ploceidae. It is found in western Angola and São Tomé Island.

== Taxonomy ==
he golden-backed bishop was formally described in 1789 by the German naturalist Johann Friedrich Gmelin in his revised and expanded edition of Carl Linnaeus's Systema Naturae. He placed it with the crossbills in the genus Loxia and coined the binomial name Loxia aurea. The specific epithet is Latin for "golden". Gmelin based his account on the "Golden-backed finch" from Angola that had been described and illustrated in 1776 by the English naturalist Peter Brown. The golden-backed bishop is now one of 18 species placed in the genus Euplectes that was introduced in 1829 by the English naturalist William Swainson. It is monotypic: no subspecies are recognised.
