= Zanzibar red bishop =

Conservation status
- Least Concern (IUCN 3.1)

Scientific classification
- Kingdom: Animalia
- Phylum: Chordata
- Class: Aves
- Order: Passeriformes
- Family: Ploceidae
- Genus: Euplectes
- Species: E. nigroventris

Binomial name
- Euplectes nigroventris Cassin, 1848

Species of bird

The Zanzibar red bishop (Euplectes nigroventris) is a species of bird in the family Ploceidae. It is found in Kenya, Mozambique, and Tanzania.

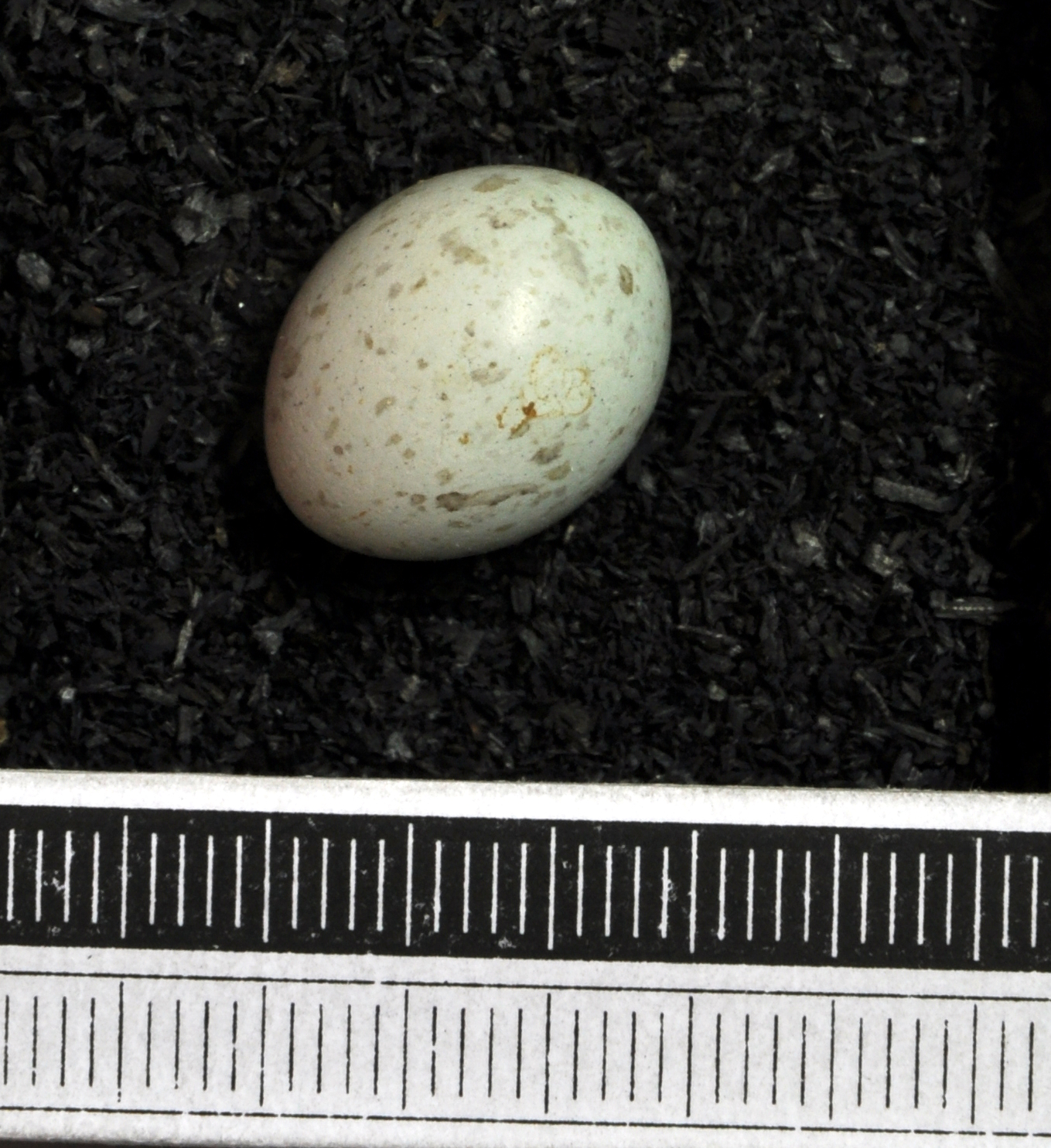
Egg, Collection Museum Wiesbaden
