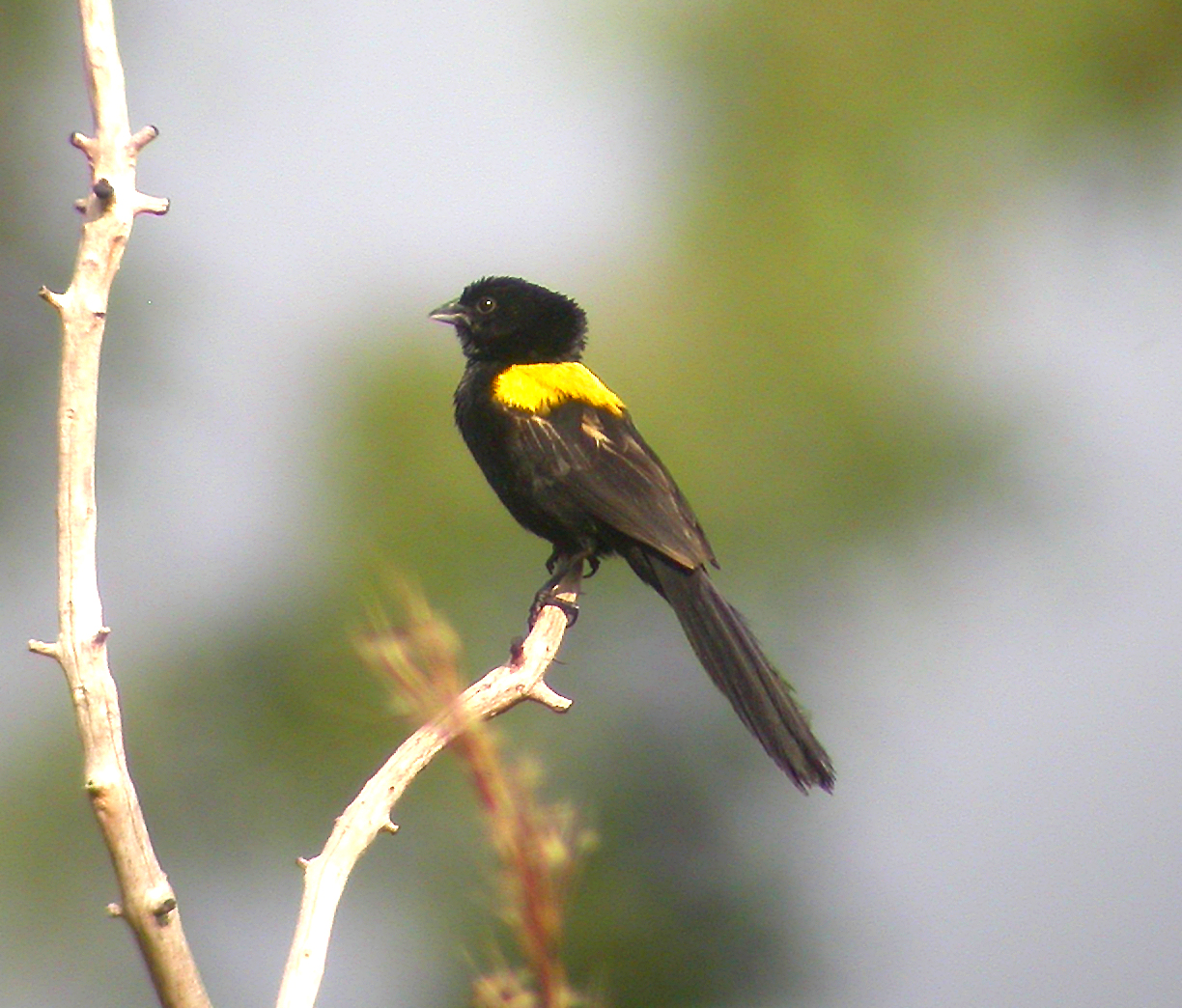
- Nominate race in the Central African Republic

Conservation status
- Least Concern (IUCN 3.1)

Scientific classification
- Kingdom: Animalia
- Phylum: Chordata
- Class: Aves
- Order: Passeriformes
- Family: Ploceidae
- Genus: Euplectes
- Species: E. macroura

Binomial name
- Euplectes macroura (Gmelin, JF, 1789)

= Yellow-mantled widowbird =

Species of bird

The yellow-mantled widowbird (Euplectes macroura), also known as the yellow-backed widow, is a species of bird in the family Ploceidae.

== Taxonomy ==
The yellow-mantled widowbird was formally described in 1789 by the German naturalist Johann Friedrich Gmelin in his revised and expanded edition of Carl Linnaeus's Systema Naturae. He placed it with the crossbills in the genus Loxia and coined the binomial name Loxia macroura. Gmelin specified the locality as "Whydah"; this is Ouidah on the coast of Benin in West Africa. The specific epithet is from Ancient Greek makros meaning "long" and -ouros meaning "tailed". The yellow-mantled widowbird is now one of 18 species placed in the genus Euplectes that was introduced in 1829 by the English naturalist William Swainson.

- E. m. macrocercus (Lichtenstein, MHC, 1823) – Ethiopia, Uganda and west Kenya
- E. m. macroura (Gmelin, JF, 1789) – Senegal and Gambia to south Sudan and southwest Kenya and south to Zambia, Malawi, Zimbabwe and west Mozambique
- E. m. conradsi (Berger, 1908) – Ukerewe Island in Lake Victoria

== Description ==
Males are larger than females and acquire longer tails and striking black and golden yellow plumages in the breeding season. The mantle colour is either golden yellow, or in the case of the northeastern race, E. m. macrocercus, black. The yellow shoulders persist in all male plumages, whether breeding or non-breeding.

== Range and habitat ==
Its natural habitat is subtropical or tropical seasonally wet or flooded lowland grassland. It has a wide intra-tropical range of presence.

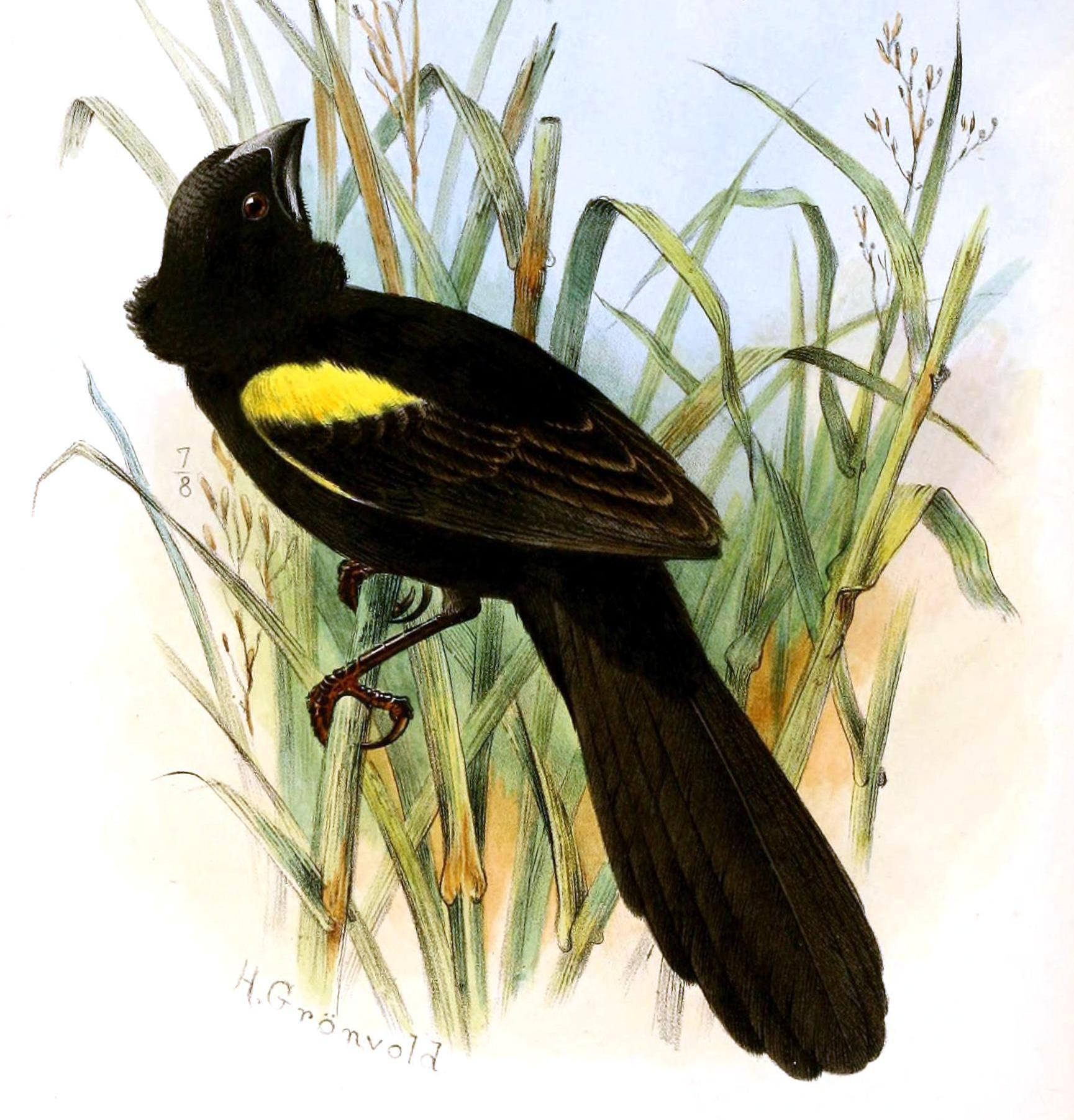
Breeding males of race E. m. subsp. macrocercus have black rather than yellow mantle plumage
