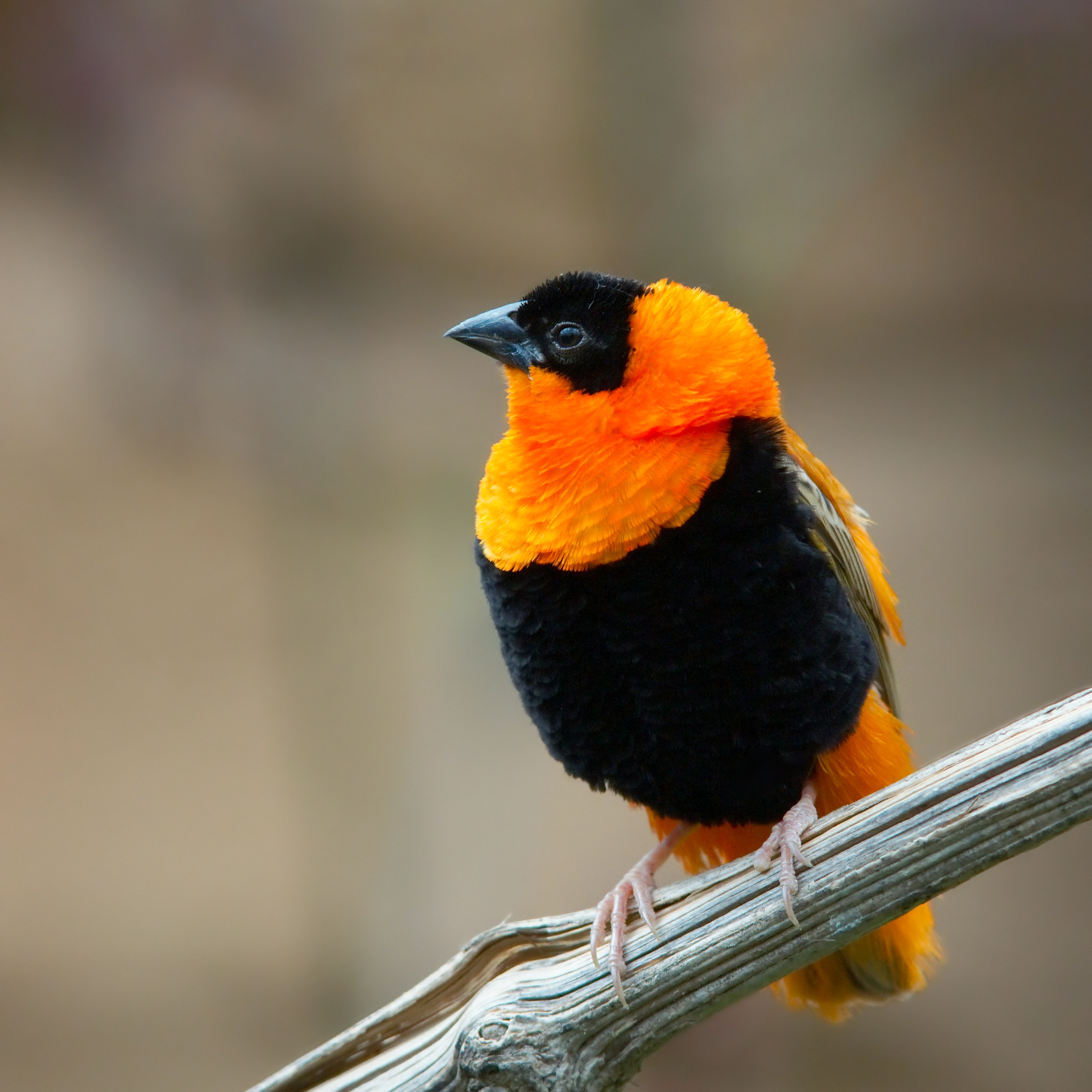
- Male in breeding plumage
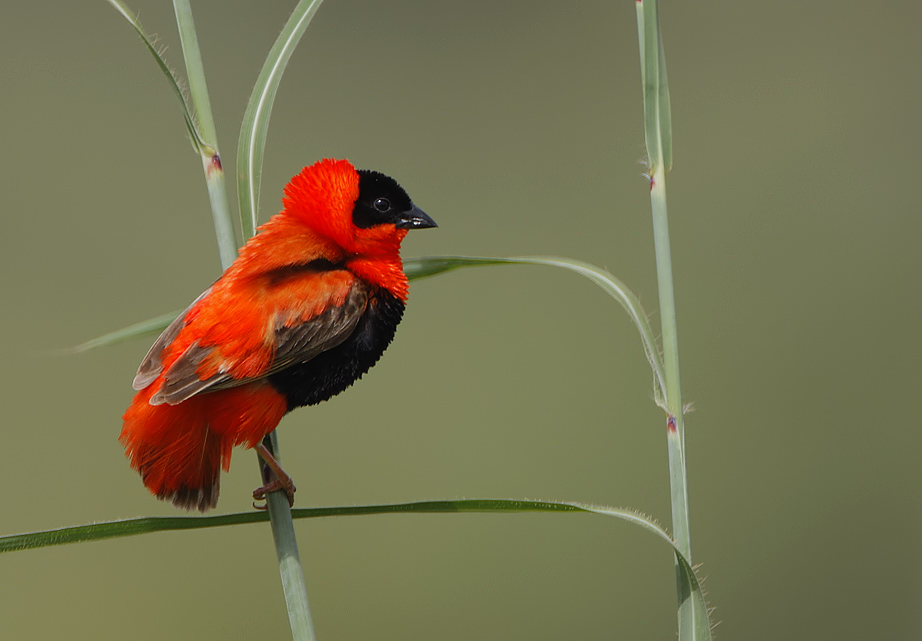
- Breeding male in Gambia

Conservation status
- Least Concern (IUCN 3.1)

Scientific classification
- Kingdom: Animalia
- Phylum: Chordata
- Class: Aves
- Order: Passeriformes
- Family: Ploceidae
- Genus: Euplectes
- Species: E. franciscanus

Binomial name
- Euplectes franciscanus (Isert, 1789)

Synonyms
- Euplectes franciscana Loxia franciscana

= Northern red bishop =

Species of bird

The northern red bishop or orange bishop (Euplectes franciscanus) is a small passerine bird in the family Ploceidae. It is part of the largest genus in the family with over 60 different species. Its sister species is the Southern red bishop (Euplectes orix). This species is most recognizable by the bright reddish orange with contrasting black plumage displayed by the breeding male. It is most common throughout the northern African continent but has also been introduced to areas in the western hemisphere.

== Taxonomy and systematics ==
The northern red bishop was first described by Paul Erdmann Isert in 1789 in Accra, Ghana. Euplectes directly translates to "good weaver," while franciscanus relates to the Franciscans, a religious order from the 12th century that symbolized the crimson color.

The northern red bishop was previously a subspecies of its neighboring species, the southern red bishop (Euplectes orix). Today, these two are classified as separate, distinct species; separated by the equator, the northern red bishop inhabits the northern continent of Africa, while the southern red bishop resides in the south. Molecular phylogenetic data in 2007 supported these two species as having a sister relationship. The northern red bishop is easily distinguished by the male's continuous red chin.

Its closest relative, aside from the southern red bishop, is the black bishop (Euplectes gierowii), native to sub-Saharan Africa. There are to-date no known described subspecies of the northern red bishop. There have been speculations of the bird being part of a superspecies with the southern red bishop (Euplectes orix) and Zanzibar red bishop (Euplectes nigroventris), but molecular data does not support this claim.

== Description ==
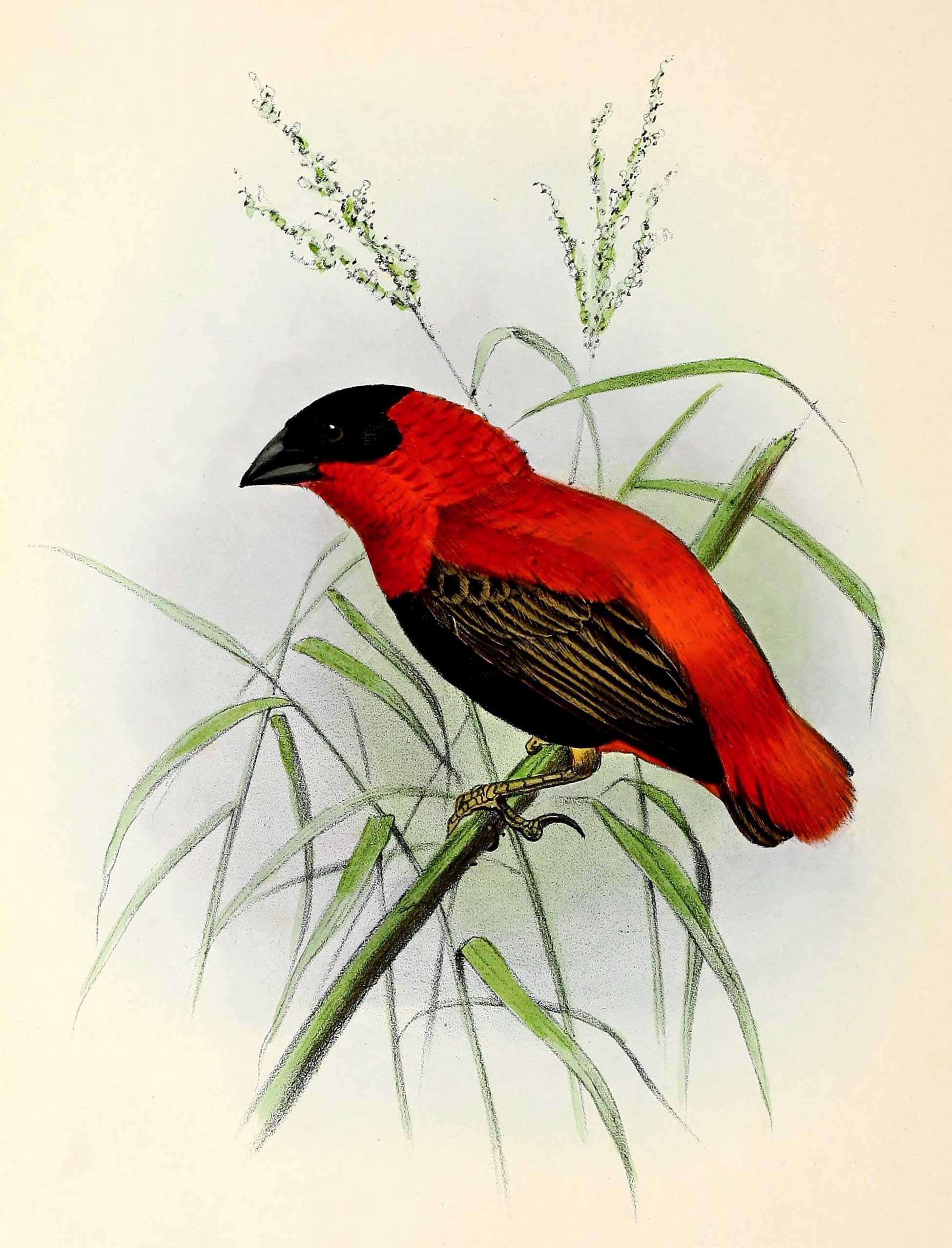
1873 illustration of an orange bishop, by John Gerrard Keulemans

This short-tailed bishop is small in size, about 11 cm and weighing about 12-22 grams. The striking red-orange feathers are produced by pigments derived from compounds in their diet. Specifically, the yellow, orange, and red pigments originate from compounds called carotenoids, which are very diet-dependent. Lutein and two red fractions (R1 and R2) derived from lutein are the two dominating carotenoids that contribute to the bird's pigment in the wild. Northern red bishops held in captivity lack the R2 red fraction carotenoid from their diet. This plumage is present on the backside of the male and wraps around the chin to back of the head, throat, and breast, with a dark black crown, forehead, flank, and belly. The tail and upper wings are brown, with pale legs and a black bill.

This plumage, the identifier of the northern red bishops, is only present in the breeding males. Females and non-breeding males have a dilute brown and white feather pattern, similar to that of a song sparrow. Males entering breeding season transition into this bright and brilliant plumage, and eventually they molt these display feathers at the end of the breeding season to acquire the plumage close to that of the females.

== Distribution and habitat ==
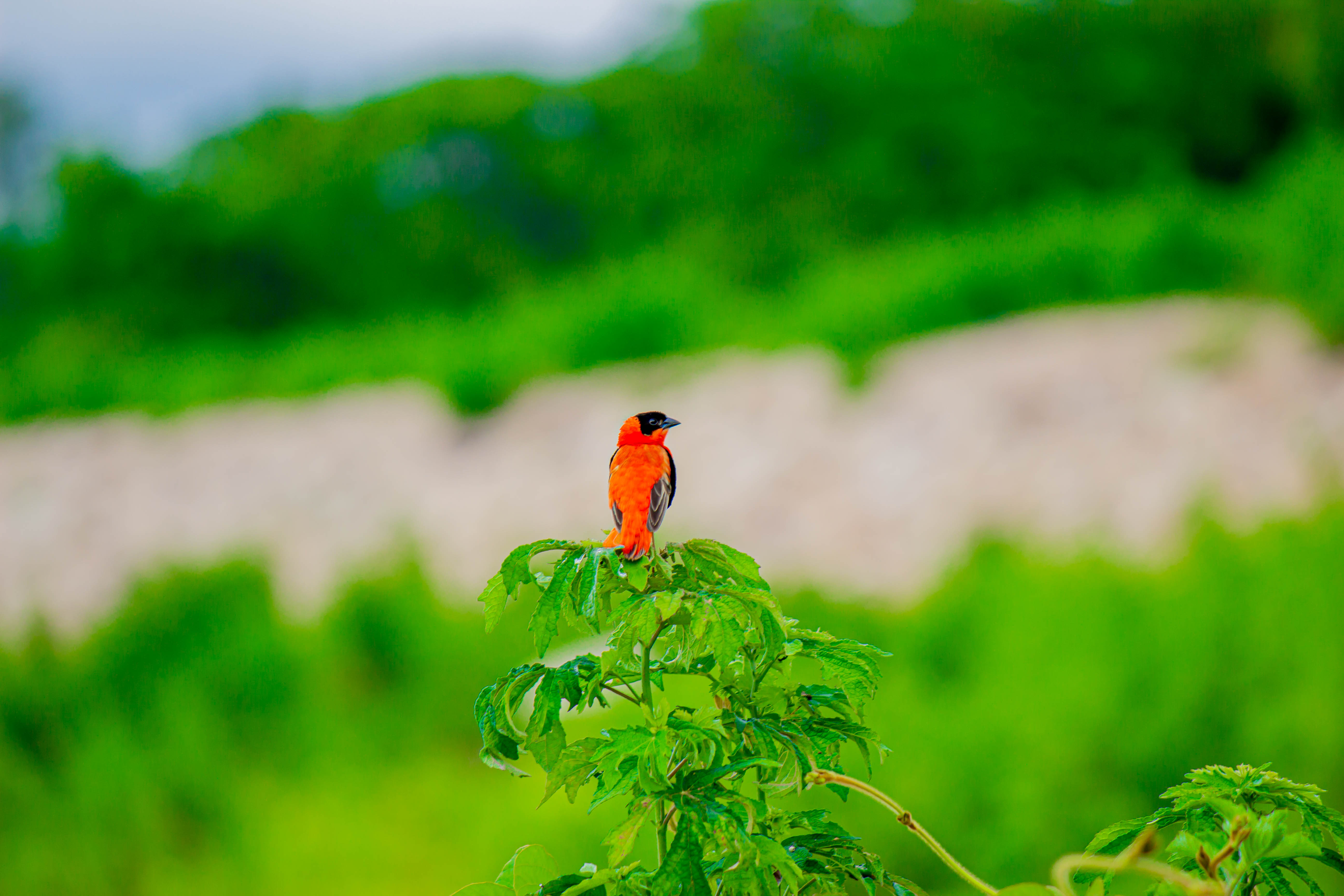
Euplectes franciscanus in Ghana

The northern red bishop has a wide distribution across northern Africa. This species inhabits northern Liberia, southern Mauritania, Senegambia, Guinea, north Sierra Leone, east Eritrea, Ethiopia, northwest and southern Somalia, northeast Democratic Republic of the Congo, North Uganda, Burkina Faso, northern Ivory Coast, South Chad, North Cameroon, Sudan, Tanzania, and Kenya. Northern red bishops generally reside in tall grasslands or cultivated areas near water and marshes. This species has been observed in lowlands to elevations as high as 1000 meters.

This species was introduced to Puerto Rico in the 1960s, and has since been reported throughout the West Indies. The northern red bishop has been reported in Martinique, Guadeloupe, Barbados, Jamaica, and St. Croix, U.S. Virgin Islands, along with recorded occurrences in Cuba. In recent decades, the northern red bishop were introduced to areas of the United States, including southern California, Texas, and Hawaii. In 1997, the estimated population size of northern red bishops in Los Angeles and Orange counties reached 400, although this number has likely declined in recent years due to a loss of marshland habitat. A small population also resides in Harris County, TX.

== Behaviour and ecology ==
=== Breeding ===
This species is sexually dimorphic and polygynous, with the males being particularly larger than the females. The genus Euplectes is notorious for sexually selected characteristics, including elaborate displays and elongated tail feathers. The bright orange-to-yellow plumage with a contrasting dark black pigment is for attracting mates. The song pattern of the male during the breeding season is quite monotonous with minimal change from season-to-season, and males may not even sing at all in the nonbreeding season. Experiments into the neural relationship between song and plumage color revealed the hyperstriatum ventralis (HVc) and the robust nucleus of the archistriatum (RA) are neural structures involved in song control. Possibly due to higher androgen levels at the time, both the HVc and RA significantly increase in volume during the breeding season. Additionally, the sizes of these structures are significantly different between the sexes, with a male having a RA more than twenty times larger than the female. The ratio of sexual dimorphism in these structures are higher than that in other songbirds.

This species is polygynous, and males will often mate with up to six females, Males use their plumage for display-flight to attract females, while puffing their body plumage out. Once a female lands, courtship follows, resulting in males building globular nests for their mate. The females in turn line the nest for her future chicks. The most striking males that build the best nests and have a higher quality territory (higher food resources) tend to have higher reproductive success, meaning there is strong sexual selection on the males to have the most vibrant plumage and to build nests in high-quality territory. Females therefore provide all of the parental care for their offspring, including incubating and feeding. Males neither care nor forage for their offspring.

Nests are generally made from multiple grasses and reeds placed within the marshy vegetation. The average clutch size in Africa is unknown, but in South Africa, the related southern red bishop averages between 2 and 3 eggs per clutch. The nestling period can last about 14-16 days. Breeding seasons can range from starting as early as May to ending as late as November and last between 2 and 6 months, depending on the beginning and end of the rainy season (typically November-March).

Additionally, clutch sizes of northern red bishops in California average between 2–3. Breeding season in this area ranges from around the peak high temperatures in August to November once temperatures begin to cool.

=== Food and feeding ===
This species tends to feed mostly on grass seeds, but they are also known to eat insects. Notable grasses the northern red bishop feeds on include Echinochloa, Cortaderia, and Paspalum dilatatum. Millet seeds are said to be favored. They have also been known to feed on aquatic vegetation (Polygonum) and cocklebur (Xanthium). In the late winter and springtime, these birds have been seen visiting seed feeders. They usually forage on the ground or within grass and weed stems, and they can hunt insects both in flight and on the ground.

Northern red bishops tend to form large flocks in the nonbreeding season and may be seen with other canaries or waxbills.

== Threats to survival ==
Little is known about this species' predators. Its closest relative, the southern red bishop, builds nests within reed beds near water, providing coverage from possible nearby predators.

== Relationship to humans ==
Over the past couple of centuries, many people have collected and introduced the species to other areas of the world, including the United States (California and Texas) and the Caribbean (Cuba). Each area has established populations of the species and continue to inhabit these areas There is lacking information about the prevalence of northern red bishops in culture, though they may occasionally be raised in captivity and are known to visit seed feeders in nearby areas they inhabit. In some regions of Africa, they can be regarded as pests to crops, damaging rice, sugar cane, millet, and maize.

== Status ==
According to the IUCN Red List of Threatened Species, the northern red bishop is vastly widespread across the globe, stable, and of least concern of endangerment. There is no current quantified population size of this species.
