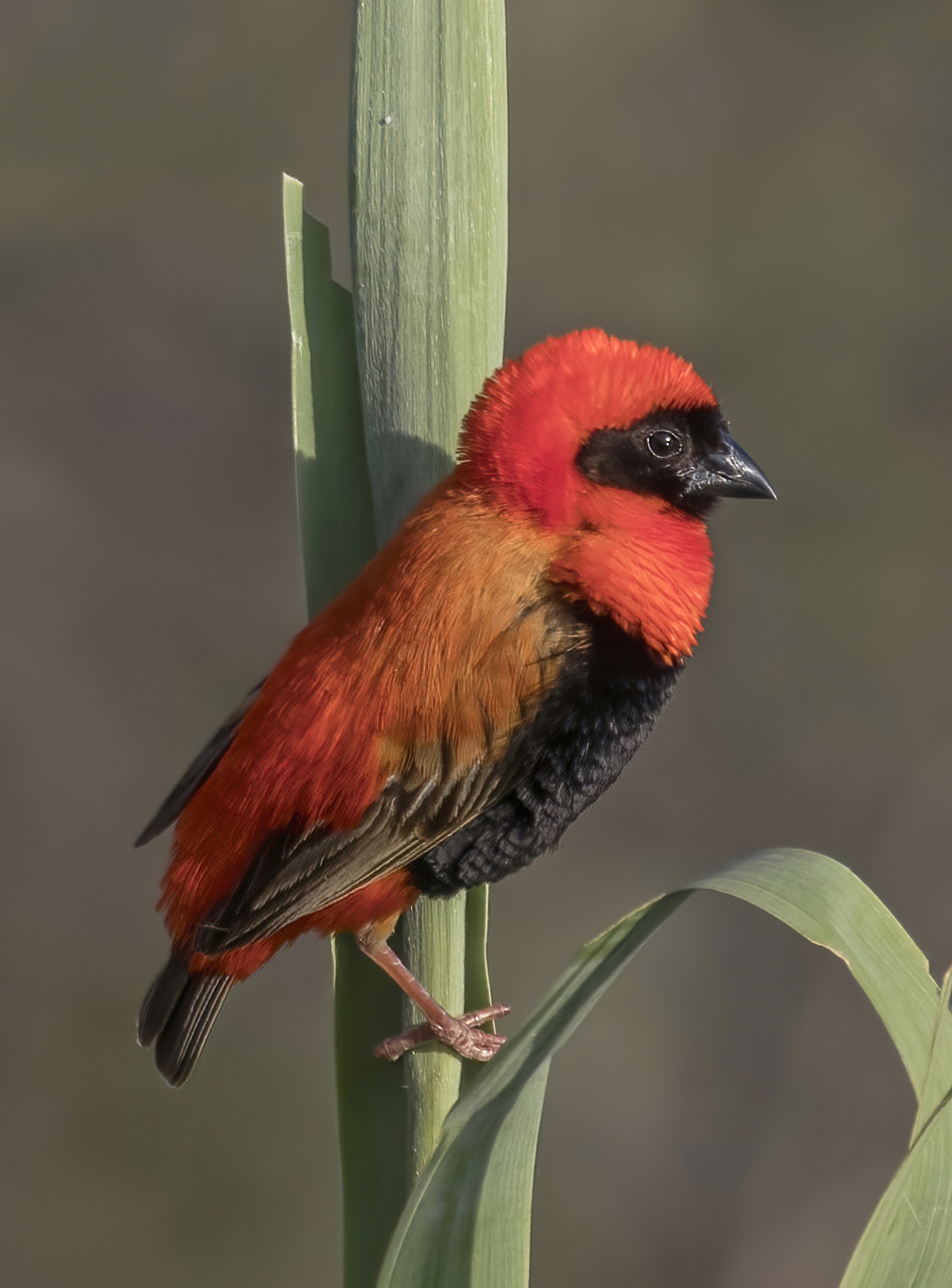
- Male, Zimbabwe
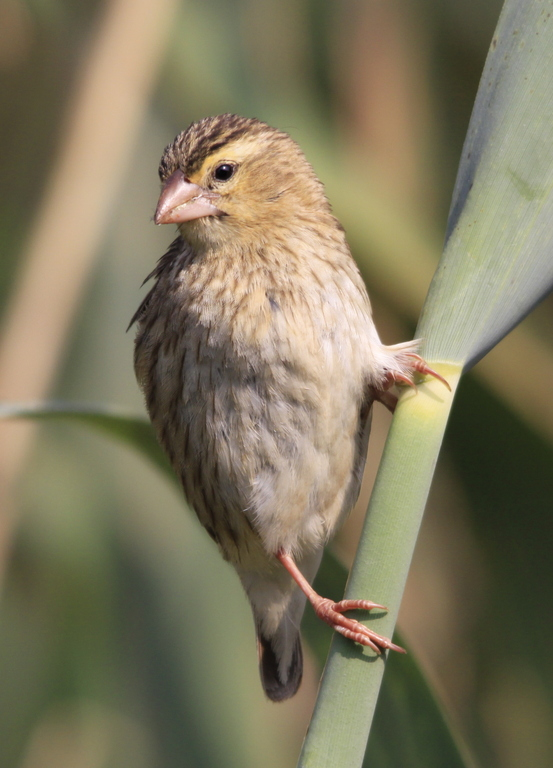
- Female perched on a reed

Conservation status
- Least Concern (IUCN 3.1)

Scientific classification
- Kingdom: Animalia
- Phylum: Chordata
- Class: Aves
- Order: Passeriformes
- Family: Ploceidae
- Genus: Euplectes
- Species: E. orix

Binomial name
- Euplectes orix (Linnaeus, 1758)

Synonyms
- Emberiza orix Linnaeus, 1758

= Southern red bishop =

Species of bird

The southern red bishop or red bishop (Euplectes orix) is a small passerine bird belonging to the bishop and widowbird genus Euplectes in the weaver family, the Ploceidae. It is common in wetlands and grassland in Africa south of the Equator. North of the Equator, it is replaced by the northern red bishop or orange bishop (E. franciscanus) which was formerly regarded as a subspecies of this species.

== Taxonomy ==
In 1751 the English naturalist George Edwards included an illustration and a description of the southern red bishop in the fourth volume of his A Natural History of Uncommon Birds. He used the English name "The Grenadier". Edwards based his hand-coloured etching on a live bird kept at the home of George Shelvocke in Greenwich. Edwards was told that the bird had come from Angola. When in 1758 the Swedish naturalist Carl Linnaeus updated his Systema Naturae for the tenth edition, he placed the southern red bishop with the buntings in the genus Emberiza. Linnaeus included a brief description, coined the binomial name Emberiza orix and cited Edwards' work. The southern red bishop is now one of 17 species placed in the genus Euplectes that was introduced in 1829 by the English naturalist William Swainson. The genus name combines the Ancient Greek eu meaning "fine" or "good" with the Neo-Latin plectes meaning "weaver". The specific epithet orix is from Latin oryza meaning "rice". The southern red bishop is considered to be monotypic: no subspecies are recognised.

== Description ==
The southern red bishop is 10–11 centimetres long and has a thick conical bill. Breeding males are brightly coloured with red (occasionally orange) and black plumage. The forehead, face and throat are black and the rest of the head is red. The upperparts are red apart from the brown wings and tail. The upper breast and under tail-coverts are red while the lower breast and belly are black. The non-breeding male and female have streaky brown plumage, paler below. Females are smaller than the males.

It has various twittering calls and a nasal contact call. The male has a buzzing song.

Breeding males of the northern red bishop have a red throat, black extending further back on the crown and long tail-coverts which almost cover the tail. The females and non-breeding males are almost identical to those of the southern red bishop.

== Distribution and habitat ==
It occurs from South Africa north to Angola, southern and eastern parts of the Democratic Republic of Congo, northern Zambia, southern Uganda, north-east Nigeria, and south-west Kenya. It is largely absent from the Namib Desert and Kalahari.

In the breeding season it is found near water among grass, reeds, sedges or crops such as sugar cane. Outside the breeding season it will venture into drier grassland and savanna habitats.

== Behaviour ==
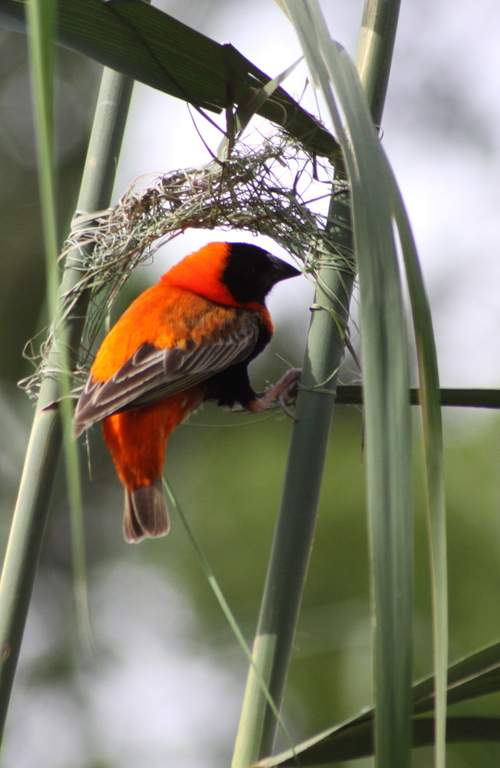
Male weaving a nest in Pretoria, South Africa

It is a fairly gregarious bird, nesting in colonies and foraging in flocks. It feeds on seeds and some insects. It often roosts in mixed flocks with other members of the weaver family.

At the start of the breeding season, the males build several nests to attract females. They perform a display flight with their feathers fluffed up. They are polygynous and mate with several females. The nest is most commonly built among reeds and is made of grasses and other plant materials woven together. Two to four eggs are laid.
