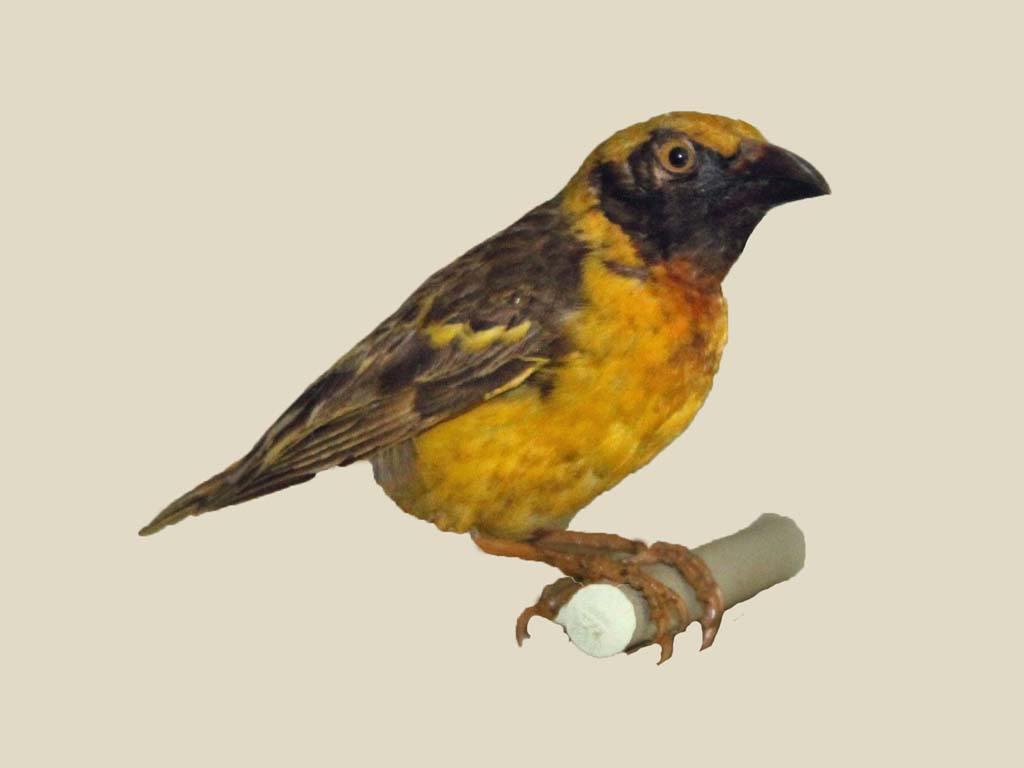
- Specimen in Nairobi National Museum
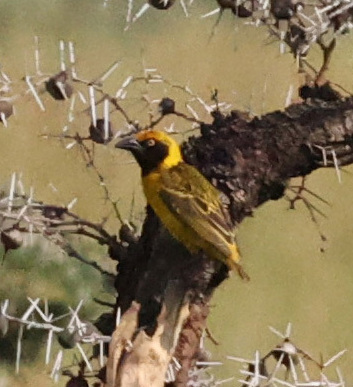
- Live bird

Conservation status
- Near Threatened (IUCN 3.1)

Scientific classification
- Kingdom: Animalia
- Phylum: Chordata
- Class: Aves
- Order: Passeriformes
- Family: Ploceidae
- Genus: Ploceus
- Species: P. spekeoides

Binomial name
- Ploceus spekeoides C. H. B. Grant & Mackworth-Praed, 1947

= Fox's weaver =

Species of bird

Fox's weaver (Ploceus spekeoides) is a species of bird in the family Ploceidae. It is endemic to Uganda.

Its natural habitats are moist savanna, subtropical or tropical seasonally wet or flooded lowland grassland, and swamps. It is threatened by habitat loss.

A specimen was collected in 1913 from Teso in Eastern Uganda. It was gifted to the British Museum of Natural History in 1923 and identified as a distinct species closely related to Ploceus spekei by C.H.B. Grant and Mackworth-Praed in 1947. The specimen collector was recorded as being T.V. Fox however some have suggested that it referred to Harold Munro Fox. There was however a Thomas Vernon Fox (20 November 1878 - 13 March 1910) in the Ugandan administrative services between 1908-1918 who collected specimens of birds from the region.
