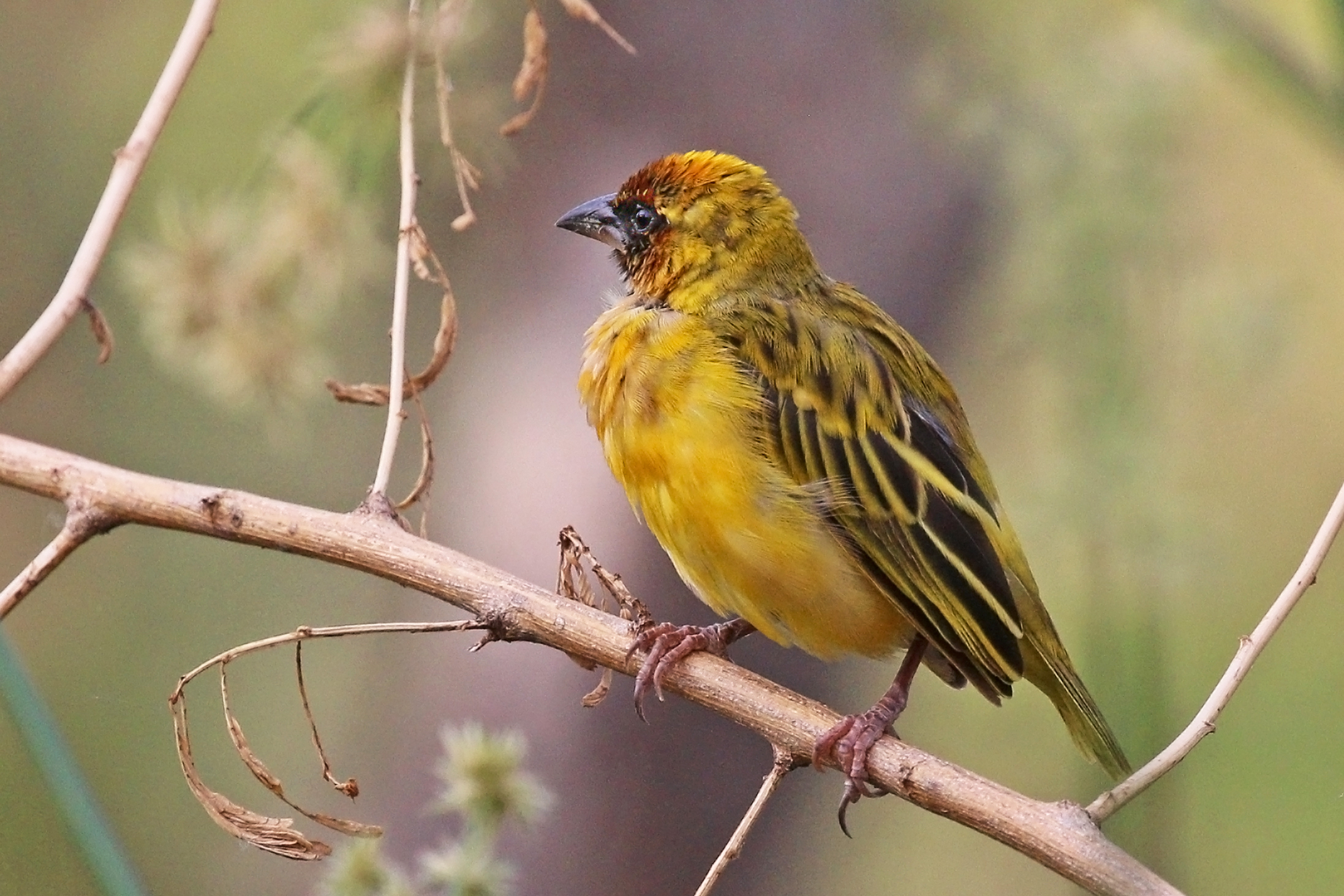
- Male in transition plumage Lake Baringo, Kenya

Conservation status
- Least Concern (IUCN 3.1)

Scientific classification
- Kingdom: Animalia
- Phylum: Chordata
- Class: Aves
- Order: Passeriformes
- Family: Ploceidae
- Genus: Ploceus
- Species: P. taeniopterus

Binomial name
- Ploceus taeniopterus (Reichenbach, 1863)

= Northern masked weaver =

Species of bird

The northern masked weaver (Ploceus taeniopterus) is a species of bird in the family Ploceidae. It is found in Democratic Republic of the Congo, Ethiopia, Kenya, and Sudan. All recent sightings in East Africa have been on the shores of Lake Baringo, Kenya.

== Gallery ==
All images below were taken at Lake Baringo.

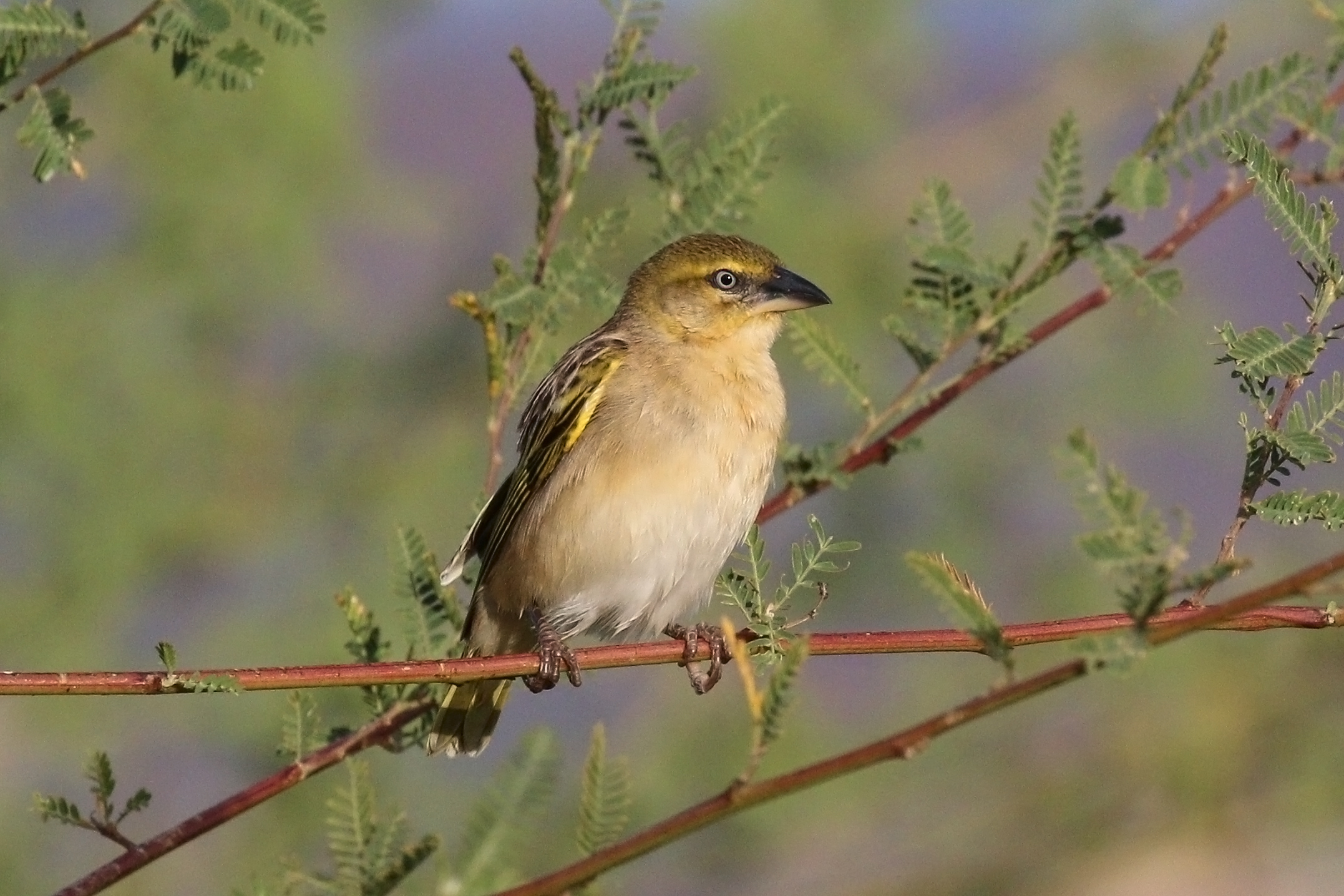
Juvenile (with white eyes)

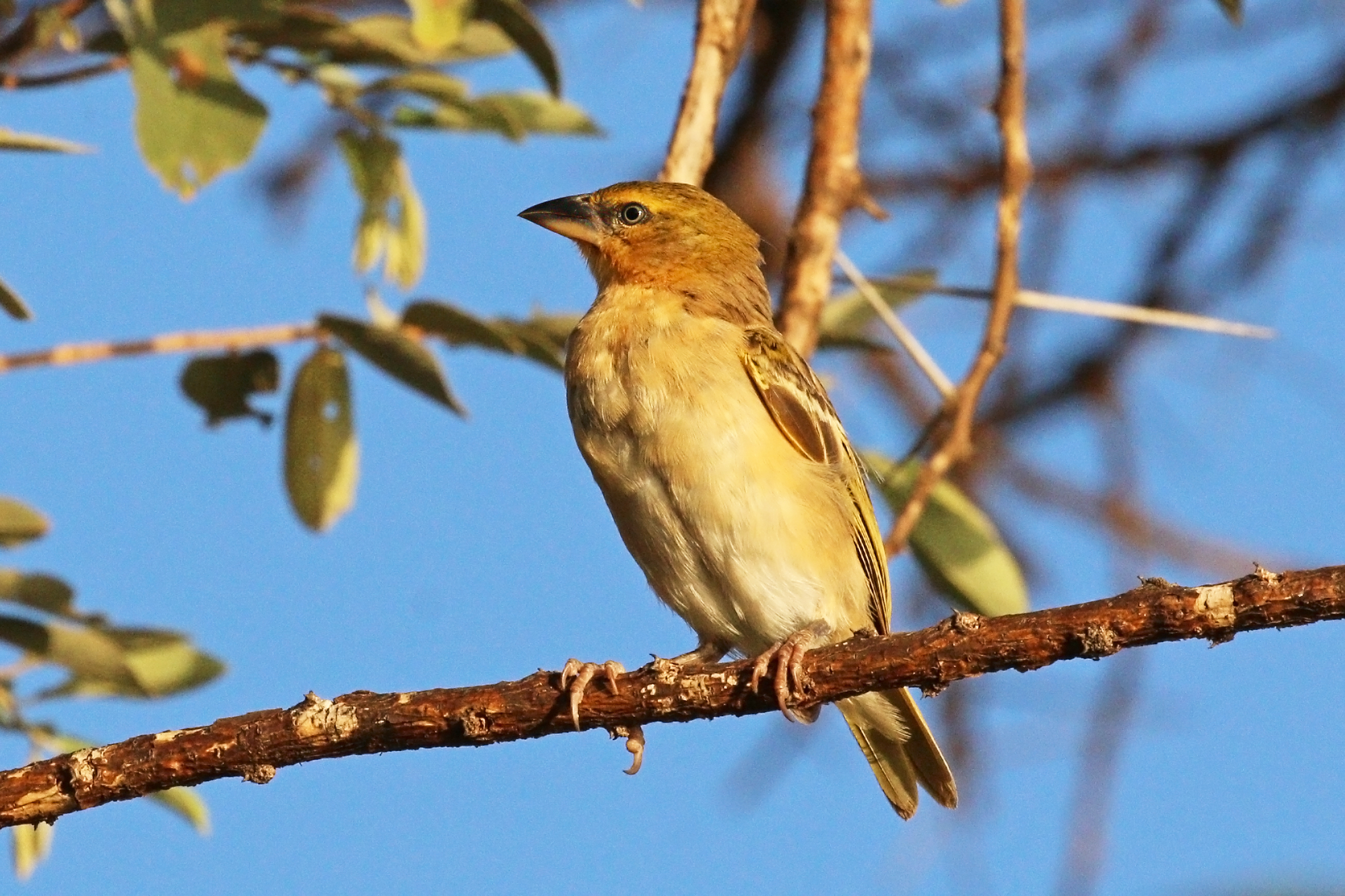
Sub-adult

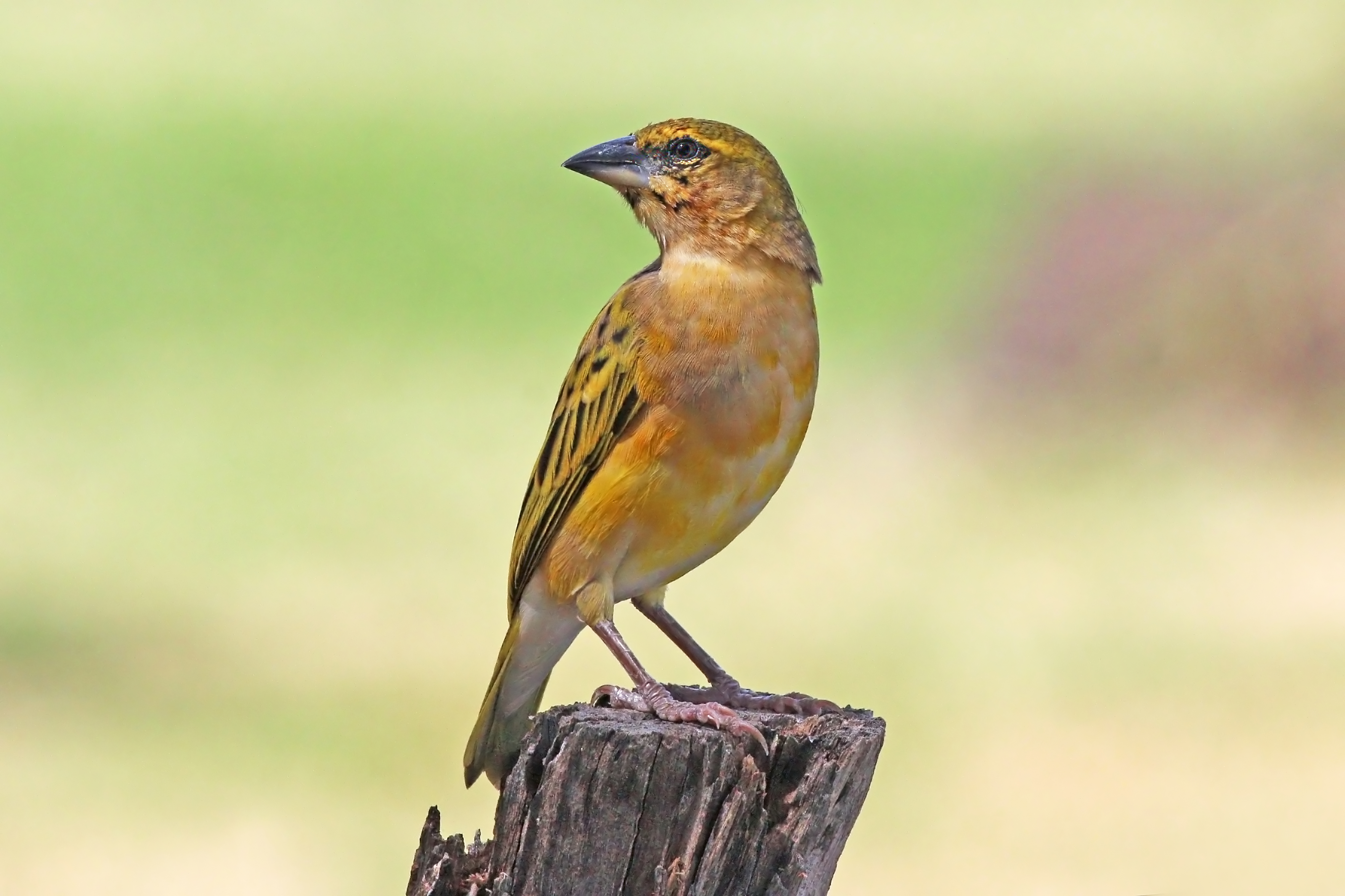
Male, non-breeding plumage

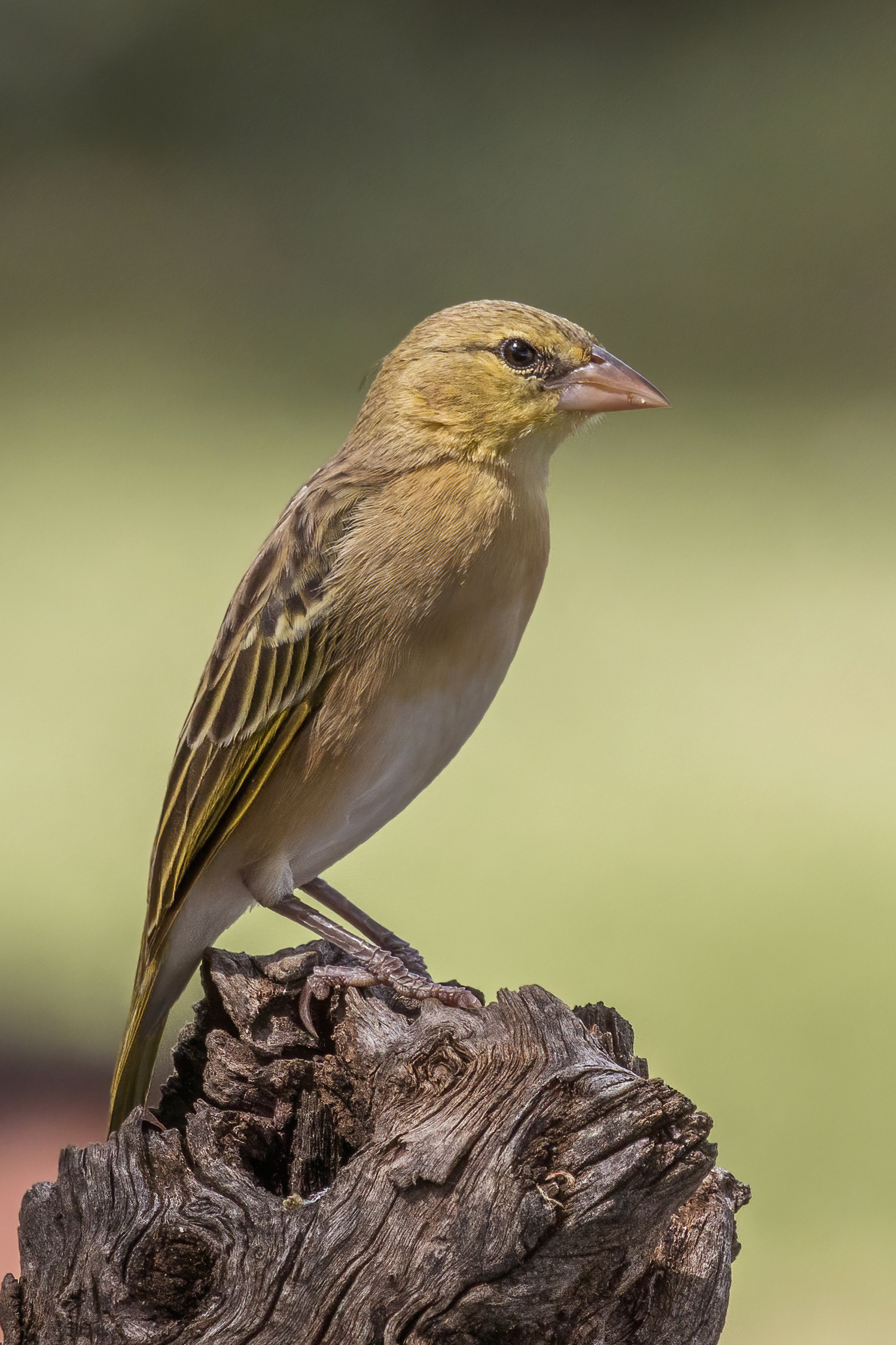
Female
