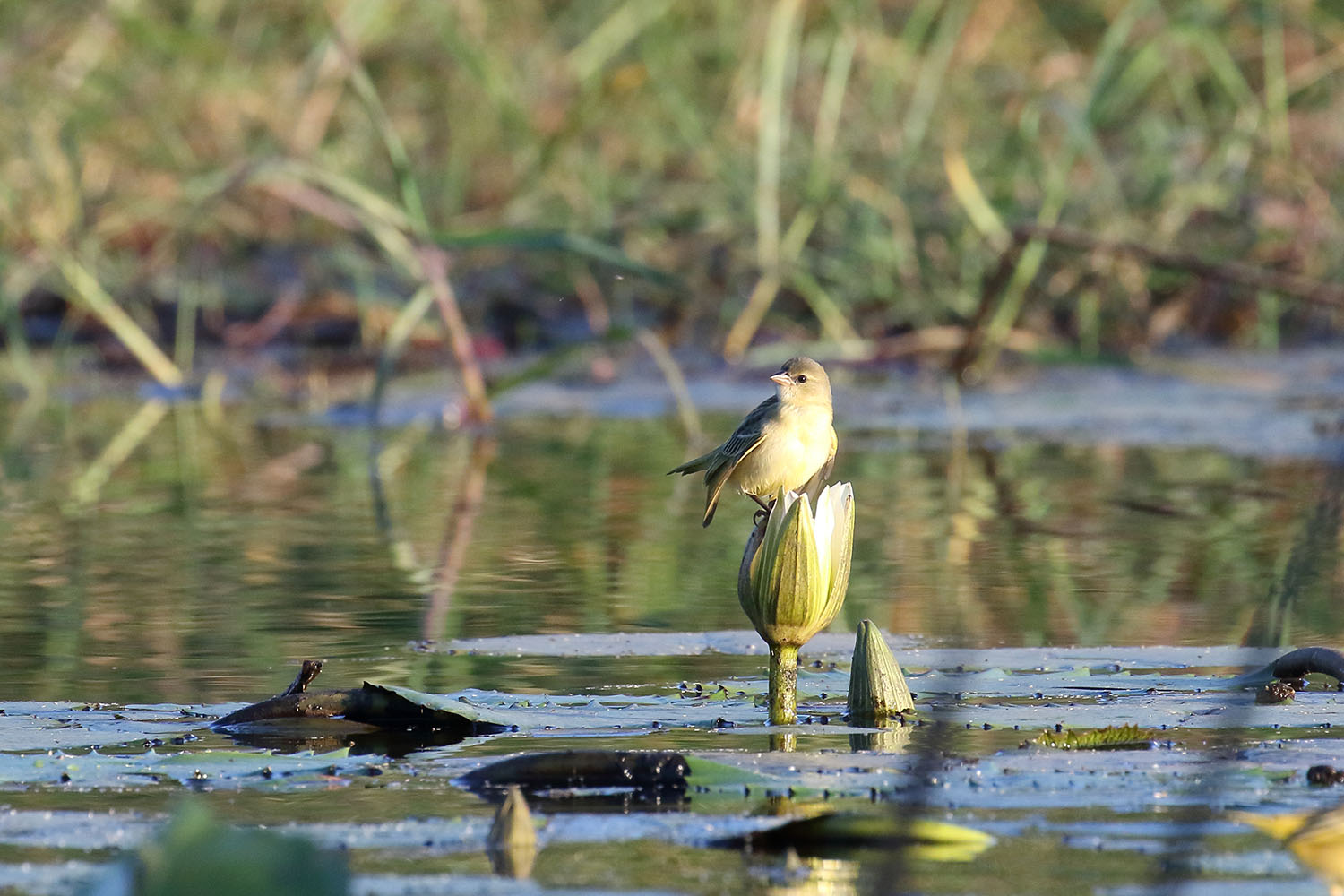

Conservation status
- Least Concern (IUCN 3.1)

Scientific classification
- Kingdom: Animalia
- Phylum: Chordata
- Class: Aves
- Order: Passeriformes
- Family: Ploceidae
- Genus: Ploceus
- Species: P. katangae

Binomial name
- Ploceus katangae (Verheyen, 1947)

= Katanga masked weaver =

Species of bird

The Katanga masked weaver (Ploceus katangae) is a species of bird in the family Ploceidae. It is found in south-eastern Democratic Republic of the Congo and northern Zambia.

There are two subspecies:

- P. k. katangae - nominate subspecies, Katanga masked-weaver. Distributed along the Luapula River in the Democratic Republic of the Congo and in the species range in Zambia.
- P. k. upembae - Upemba masked-weaver. Distributed along the Lualaba River in the Democratic Republic of the Congo. Adult males have larger bills than nominate subspecies.
