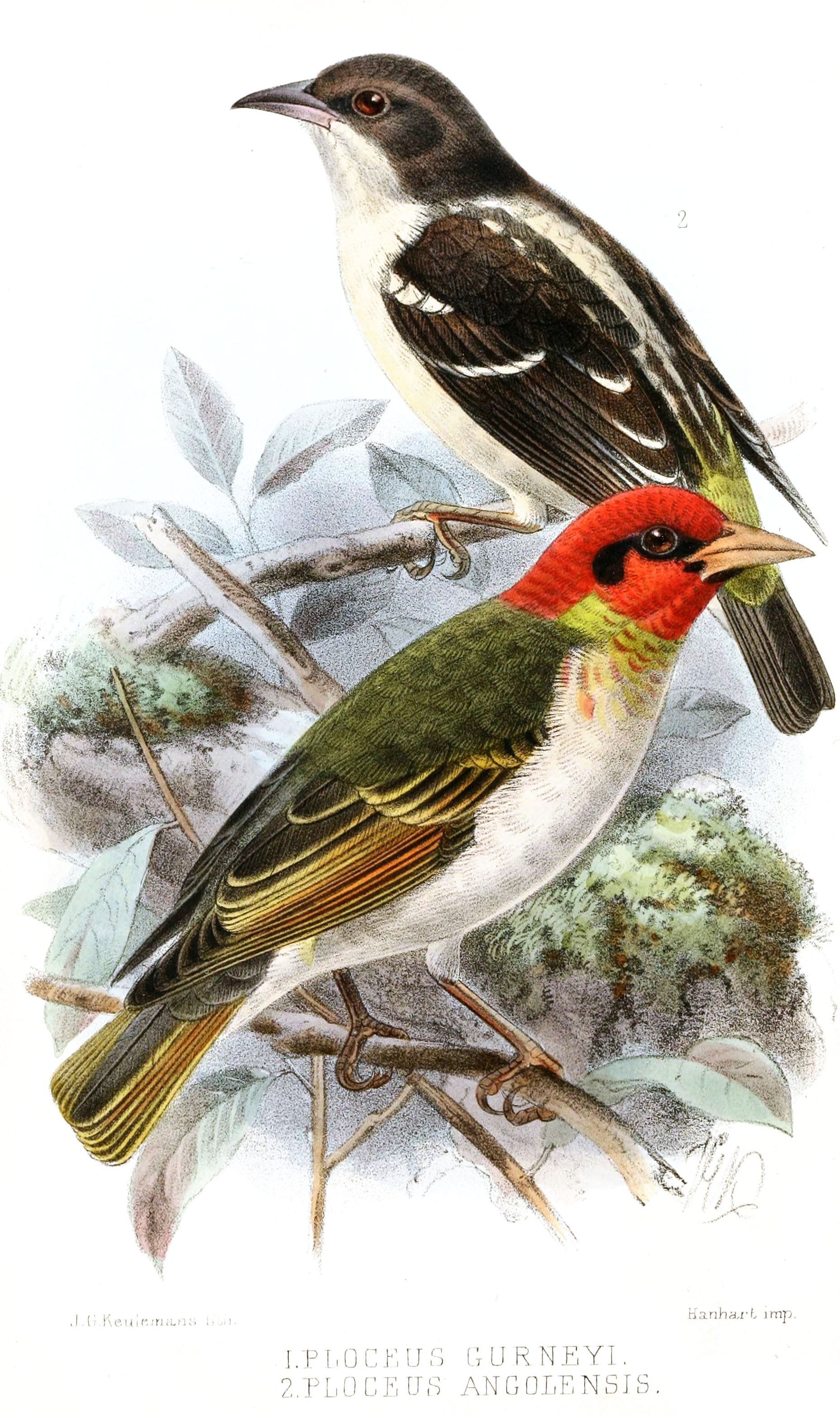
- Illustration (bird in background) with a red-headed weaver (foreground)

Conservation status
- Least Concern (IUCN 3.1)

Scientific classification
- Kingdom: Animalia
- Phylum: Chordata
- Class: Aves
- Order: Passeriformes
- Family: Ploceidae
- Genus: Ploceus
- Species: P. angolensis

Binomial name
- Ploceus angolensis (Barboza du Bocage, 1878)

= Bar-winged weaver =

Species of bird

The bar-winged weaver (Ploceus angolensis) is a species of bird in the family Ploceidae. It is found in Angola, Democratic Republic of the Congo, and Zambia.

== Description ==
The weaver is 13cm in length, with dark coloring on the top of the bird's body and light on the bottom. It has dark blackish-brown feathers covering the top of the head and continuing down onto the wings. The wings also contain white tips at the end of each feather, with the female containing much more white. In the middle of the wings, a yellow strip runs down the back of the weaver. The tail resembles the same blackish-brown coloring that is on the head and wings. The chin and belly have a white and yellow wash of color and the females are seen with a whiter coloring. The bill is black, the legs are brown, and the eye iris of the weaver is red.

== Diet ==
Bar-winged weavers are insectivorous. Specifically, they eat mantids (Mantidae), beetles (Coleoptera), and chironomid larvae (Diptera). They forage for their food on trees covered with lichens and Usnea and move like nuthatches to find their food.

== Habitat ==
Weavers live in mature evergreen (Cryptosepalum) forests and miombo (Brachystegia) woodland which is moist enough to grow Usnealichen on the trees.

== Sounds and vocal behavior ==
The song is composed of several fast, tuneful notes in a crescendo, leading up to loud swizzle; sometimes followed by more tuneful notes in a decrescendo. Not very vocal, but occasionally calls a series of high-pitched squeaks, buzzes, and churrs. Normally sounds, "tyoo-vo-vo-vo", also higher-pitched "tree-zi-zee-zi-zee-zi".

== Breeding ==
The bar-winged weaver is a solitary, monogamous breeder. The nest is a roughly spherical ball with an entrance tube of length 30–210 mm hanging down from one side. One nest had an apparent false entrance to an empty chamber. The clutch of 2–3 eggs are turquoise-blue, flecked and clouded with darker markings, mostly at the thicker end.

== Conservation status ==
The bar-winged weaver is a very poorly known species. It is very uncommon in the range of habitats it is said to be found in. The bird is not globally threatened and can be found in protected areas in Zambia.
