= Black-chinned weaver =

Conservation status
- Least Concern (IUCN 3.1)

Scientific classification
- Kingdom: Animalia
- Phylum: Chordata
- Class: Aves
- Order: Passeriformes
- Family: Ploceidae
- Genus: Ploceus
- Species: P. nigrimentus

Binomial name
- Ploceus nigrimentus Reichenow, 1904

Synonyms
- Ploceus nigrimentum Reichenow, 1904 [orth. error]

Species of bird

The black-chinned weaver (Ploceus nigrimentus) is a species of bird in the family Ploceidae.

It is found in the Bailundu Highlands of western Angola, on the Batéké Plateau in Republic of the Congo, and in eastern Gabon.
