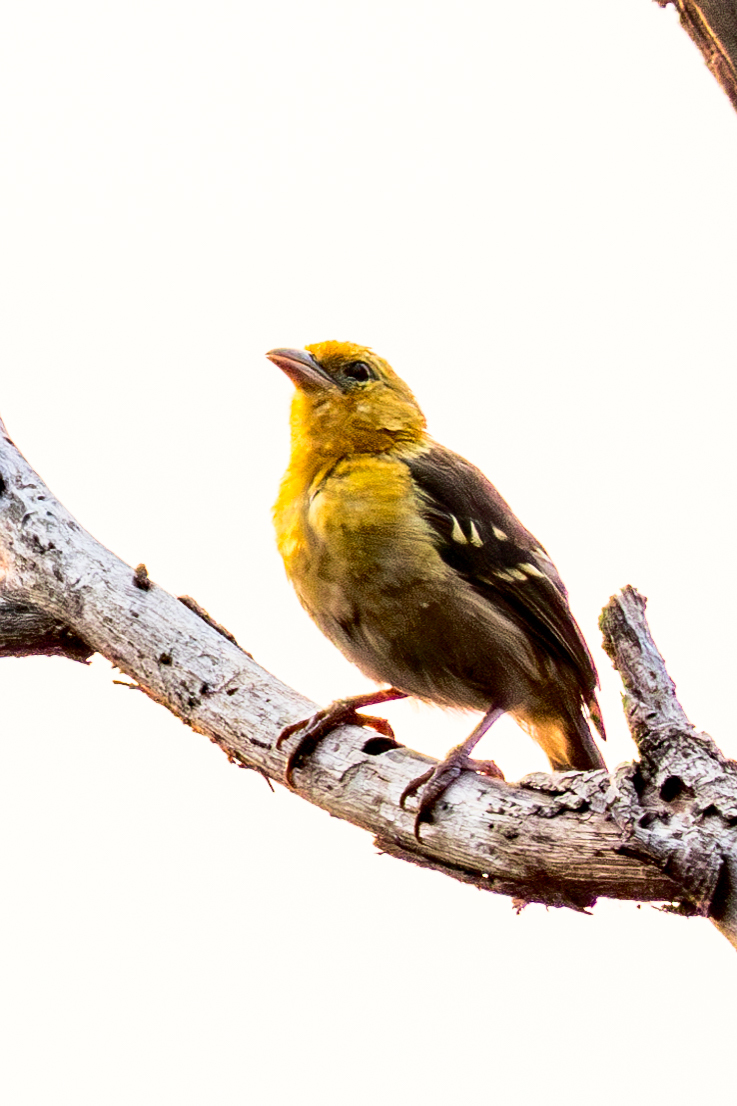

Conservation status
- Least Concern (IUCN 3.1)

Scientific classification
- Kingdom: Animalia
- Phylum: Chordata
- Class: Aves
- Order: Passeriformes
- Family: Ploceidae
- Genus: Ploceus
- Species: P. sanctithomae

Binomial name
- Ploceus sanctithomae (Hartlaub, 1848)

Synonyms
- Sycobius st. thomae

= São Tomé weaver =

Species of bird

The São Tomé weaver (Ploceus sanctithomae) is a species of bird in the family Ploceidae. It is endemic to São Tomé and Príncipe. They are found in the island of São Tomé. Its natural habitats are subtropical or tropical moist lowland forests and subtropical or tropical moist montane forests.
