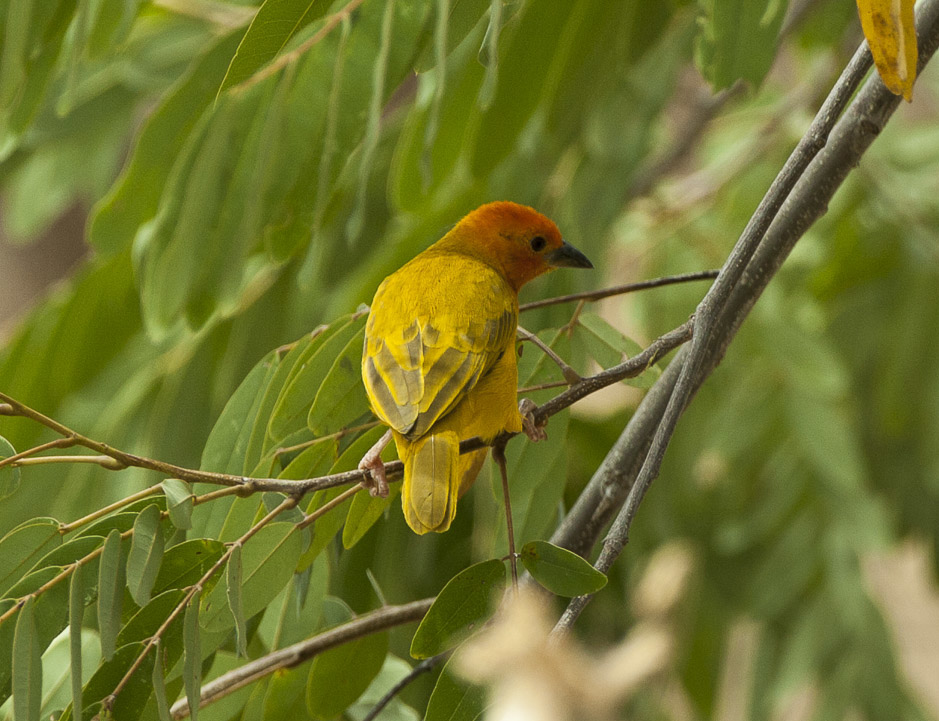

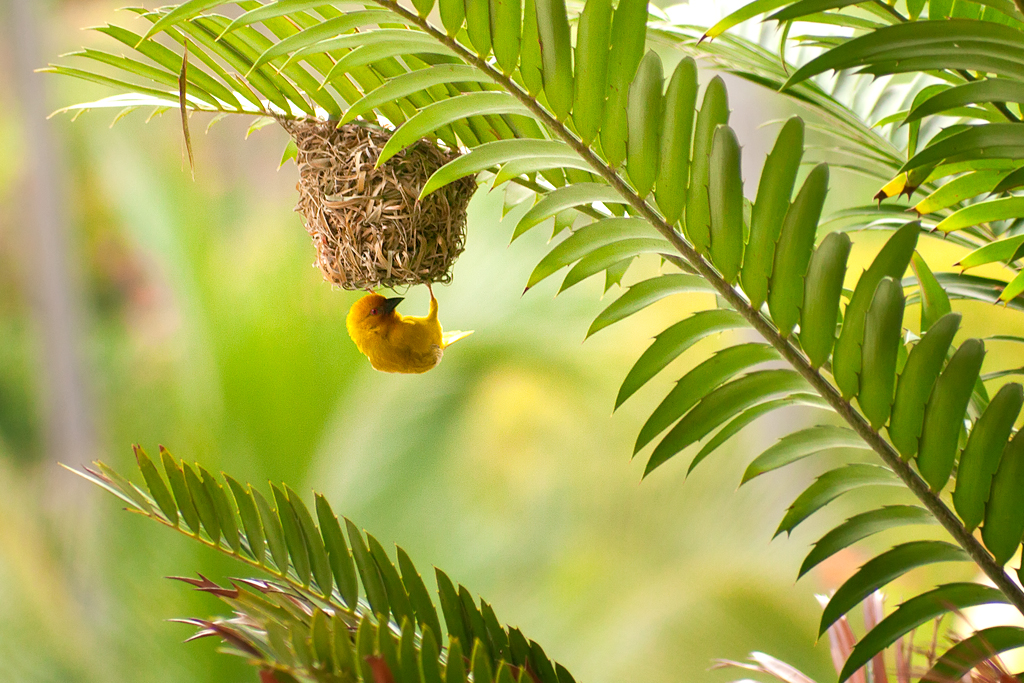

Conservation status
- Least Concern (IUCN 3.1)

Scientific classification
- Kingdom: Animalia
- Phylum: Chordata
- Class: Aves
- Order: Passeriformes
- Family: Ploceidae
- Genus: Ploceus
- Species: P. bojeri

Binomial name
- Ploceus bojeri (Cabanis, 1869)

= Golden palm weaver =

Species of eastern African bird

The golden palm weaver (Ploceus bojeri) is a species of bird in the weaver family, Ploceidae. It is found in eastern Africa.
