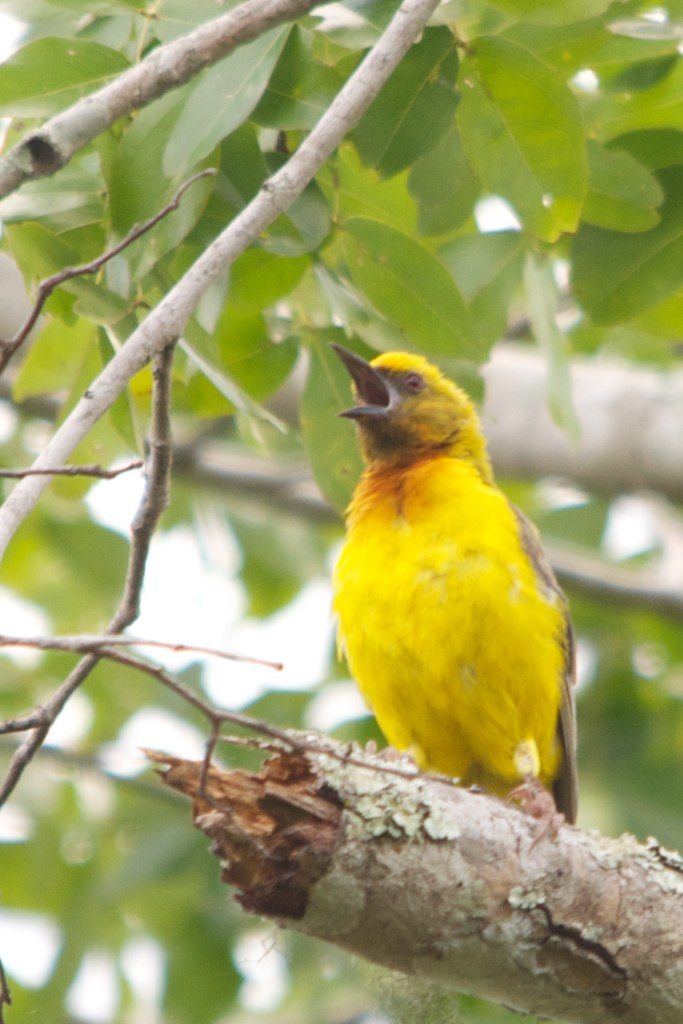

Conservation status
- Near Threatened (IUCN 3.1)

Scientific classification
- Kingdom: Animalia
- Phylum: Chordata
- Class: Aves
- Order: Passeriformes
- Family: Ploceidae
- Genus: Ploceus
- Species: P. olivaceiceps

Binomial name
- Ploceus olivaceiceps (Reichenow, 1899)

= Olive-headed weaver =

Species of bird

The olive-headed weaver (Ploceus olivaceiceps) is a species of bird in the family Ploceidae. It is found in Malawi, Mozambique, Tanzania, and Zambia. Its natural habitat is subtropical or tropical dry forests. It is threatened by habitat loss.
