= Bocage's weaver =

Conservation status
- Least Concern (IUCN 3.1)

Scientific classification
- Kingdom: Animalia
- Phylum: Chordata
- Class: Aves
- Order: Passeriformes
- Family: Ploceidae
- Genus: Ploceus
- Species: P. temporalis

Binomial name
- Ploceus temporalis (Barboza du Bocage, 1880)

Synonyms
- Xanthophilus temporalis Bocage, 1880; Heterhyphantes temporalis Sharpe, 1890; Othyphantes temporalis Shelley, 1896

Species of bird

Bocage's weaver (Ploceus temporalis) is a species of bird in the family Ploceidae. It is found in riparian zones of Angola, Southern Democratic Republic of the Congo and northwestern Zambia. The riparian zones it inhabits includes swamps, marshes, and streamside vegetation, usually in areas with tall grasses and trees.

Breeding males possess a distinctive golden-yellow head and crown, with a long, thin, dusky-olive bib and cream-colored eyes. They are known to be colonial, with upwards of 30 nests, often suspended from branches over water. Their diet consists primarily of insects such as beetles and caterpillars.

The common name and Latin binomial commemorate the Portuguese naturalist José Vicente Barbosa du Bocage, who described the species in 1880.
