= Yellow-legged weaver =

Conservation status
- Vulnerable (IUCN 3.1)

Scientific classification
- Kingdom: Animalia
- Phylum: Chordata
- Class: Aves
- Order: Passeriformes
- Family: Ploceidae
- Genus: Ploceus
- Species: P. flavipes

Binomial name
- Ploceus flavipes (Chapin, 1916)

Synonyms
- Malimbus flavipes Chapin, 1916

Species of bird

The yellow-legged weaver (Ploceus flavipes) is a species of bird in the family Ploceidae. It is endemic to Democratic Republic of the Congo.

Its natural habitat is subtropical or tropical moist lowland forests. It is threatened by habitat loss.
