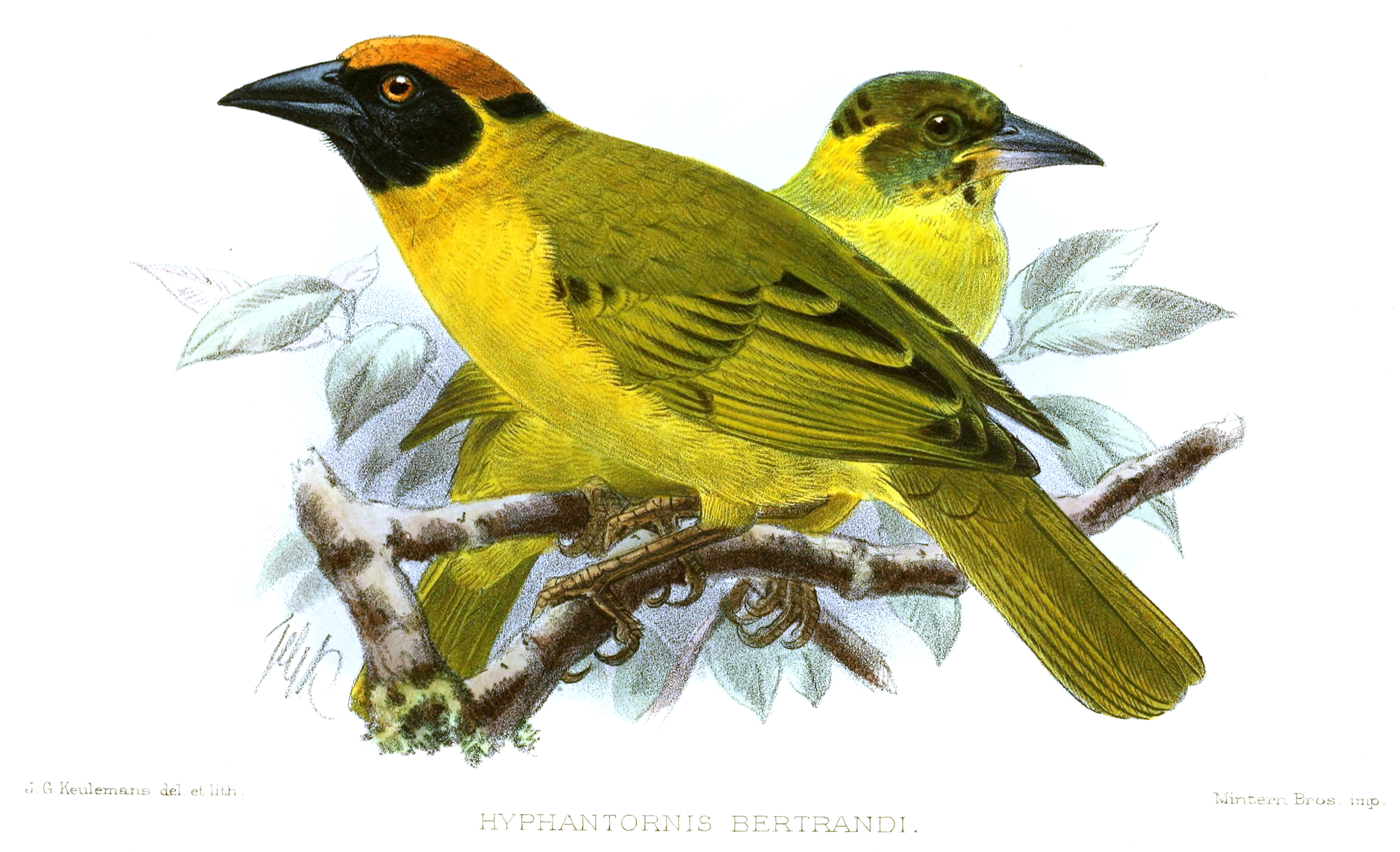

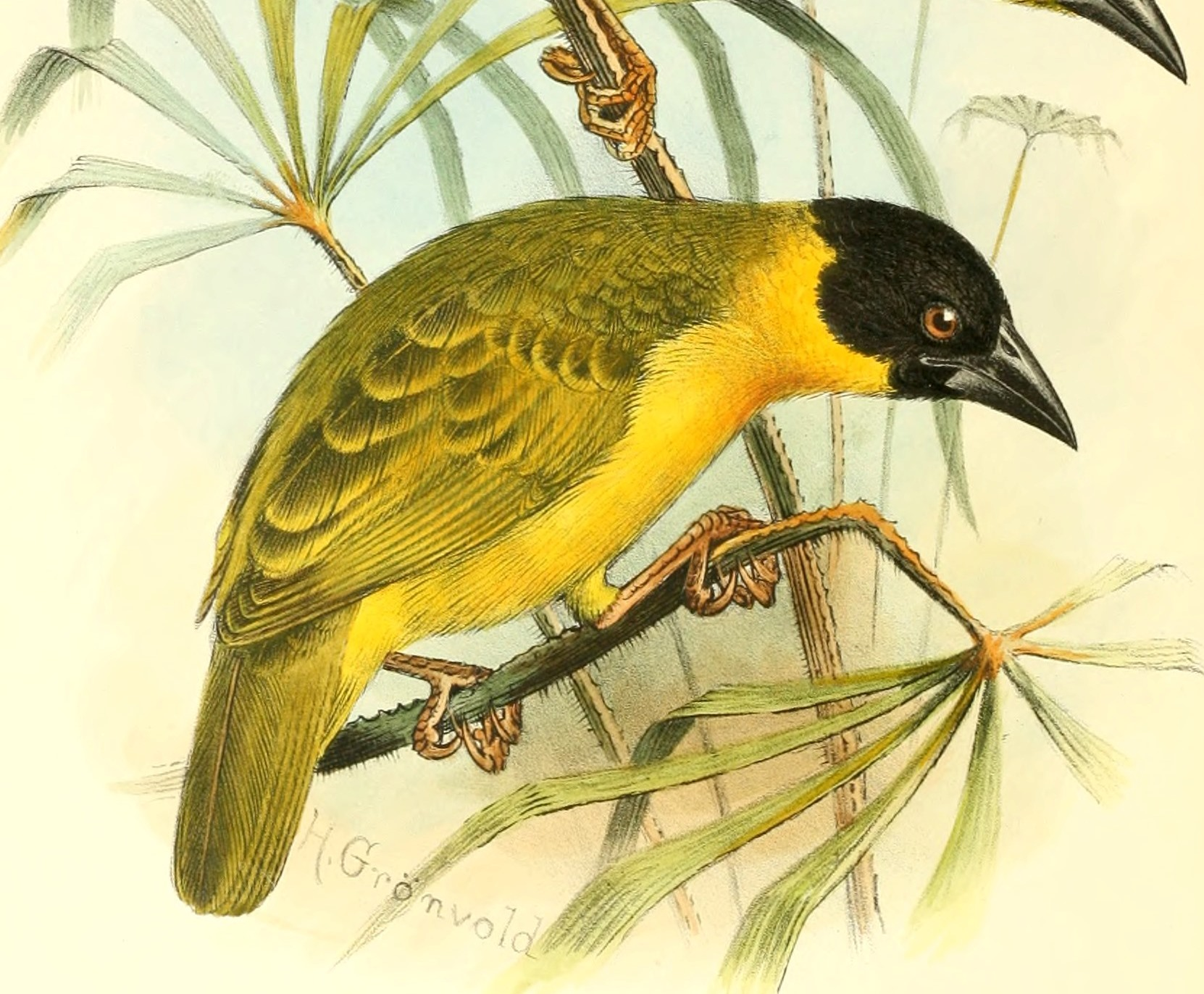
- Illustrations of male and immature by Keulemans and female by Grönvold

Conservation status
- Least Concern (IUCN 3.1)

Scientific classification
- Kingdom: Animalia
- Phylum: Chordata
- Class: Aves
- Order: Passeriformes
- Family: Ploceidae
- Genus: Ploceus
- Species: P. bertrandi

Binomial name
- Ploceus bertrandi (Shelley, 1893)

Synonyms
- Hyphantornis bertrandi Shelley, 1893; Hyphantornis nyasae Shelley, 1894; Ploceus fülleborni Reichen, 1900; Ploceus nyasae Reichen, 1904

= Bertram's weaver =

Species of bird

Bertram's weaver (Ploceus bertrandi), sometimes called Bertrand's weaver, is a species of bird in the family Ploceidae.

It is native to the Eastern Arc forests and mountains of Malawi.

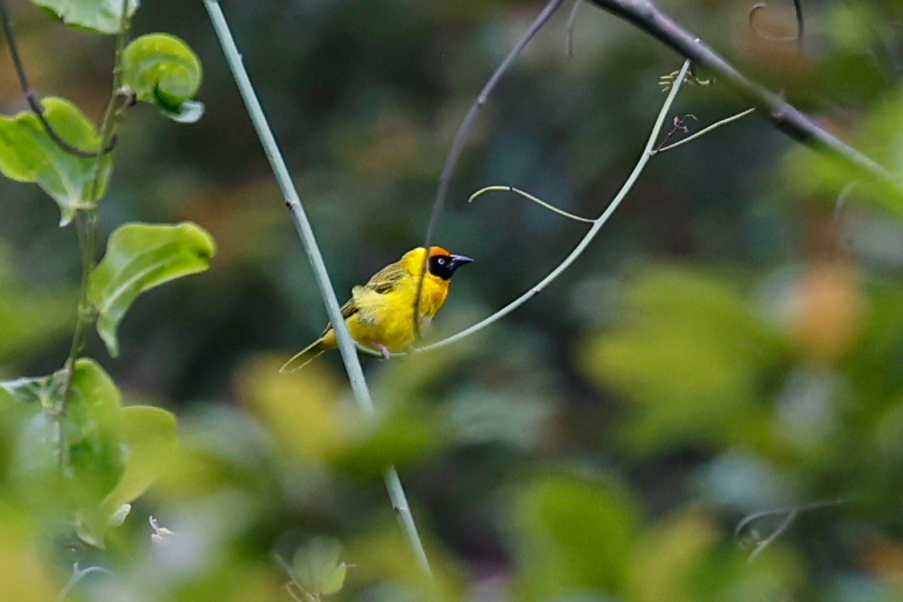
Live bird in Tanzania

It is named after Bertram Lutley Sclater, the son of ornithologist Philip Lutley Sclater, who was a police commissioner in Malawi when Alexander Whyte discovered this species.
