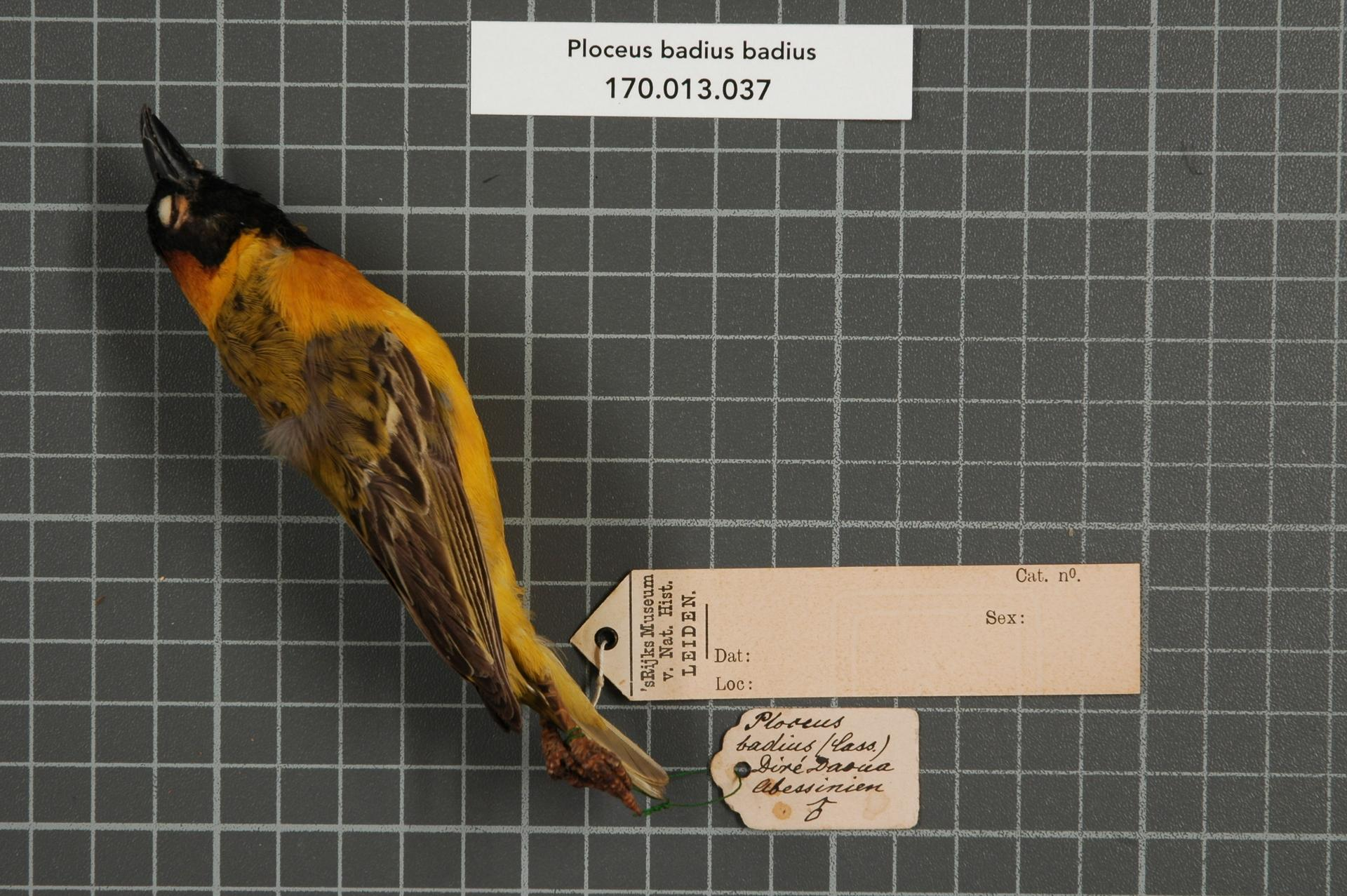

Conservation status
- Least Concern (IUCN 3.1)

Scientific classification
- Kingdom: Animalia
- Phylum: Chordata
- Class: Aves
- Order: Passeriformes
- Family: Ploceidae
- Genus: Ploceus
- Species: P. badius

Binomial name
- Ploceus badius (Cassin, 1850)

= Cinnamon weaver =

Species of bird

The cinnamon weaver (Ploceus badius) is a species of bird in the family Ploceidae. It is found only in Sudan and South Sudan. The cinnamon weaver is nomadic, returning to breeding areas during the September–October breeding season. Possibly monogamous, weavers live communally, preferring tall trees with dense foliage.
