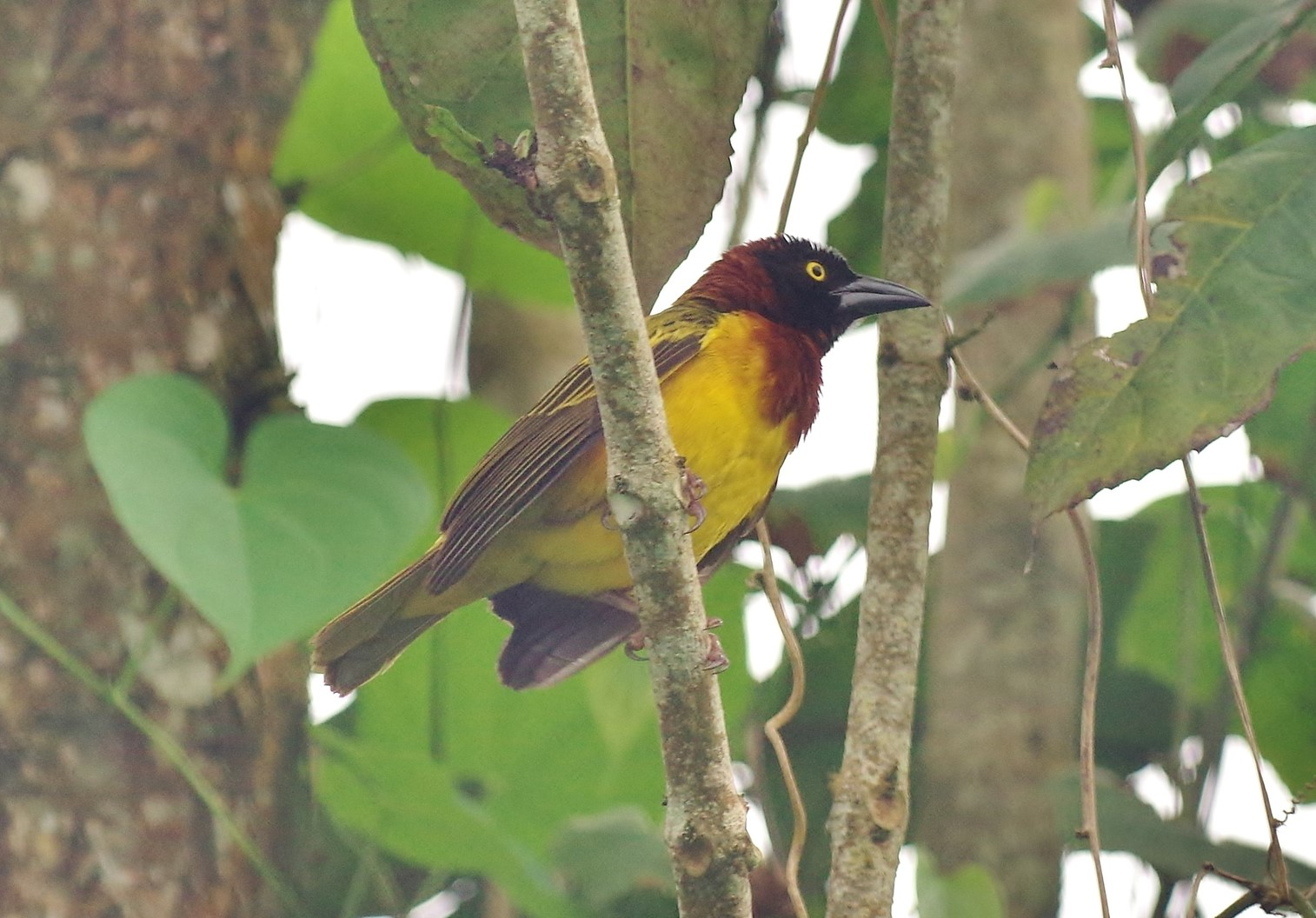
- Male
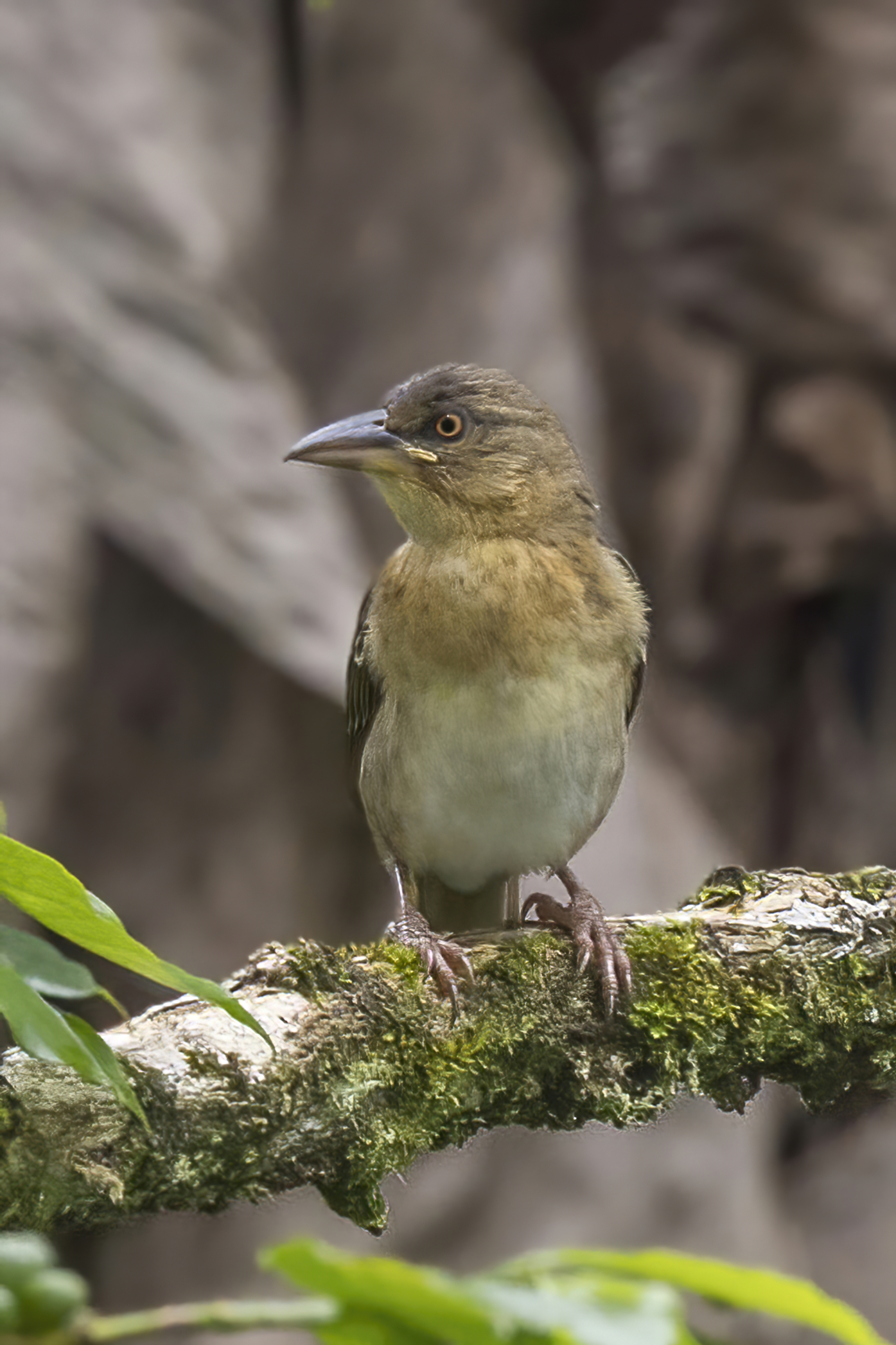
- Female both on São Tomé

Conservation status
- Near Threatened (IUCN 3.1)

Scientific classification
- Kingdom: Animalia
- Phylum: Chordata
- Class: Aves
- Order: Passeriformes
- Family: Ploceidae
- Genus: Ploceus
- Species: P. grandis

Binomial name
- Ploceus grandis (G.R. Gray, 1844)

= Giant weaver =

Species of bird

The giant weaver (Ploceus grandis) is a species of bird in the family Ploceidae. It is endemic to São Tomé Island. It can climb trees and branches, rather like a treecreeper or sittella. Its natural habitat is subtropical or tropical moist lowland forests.
