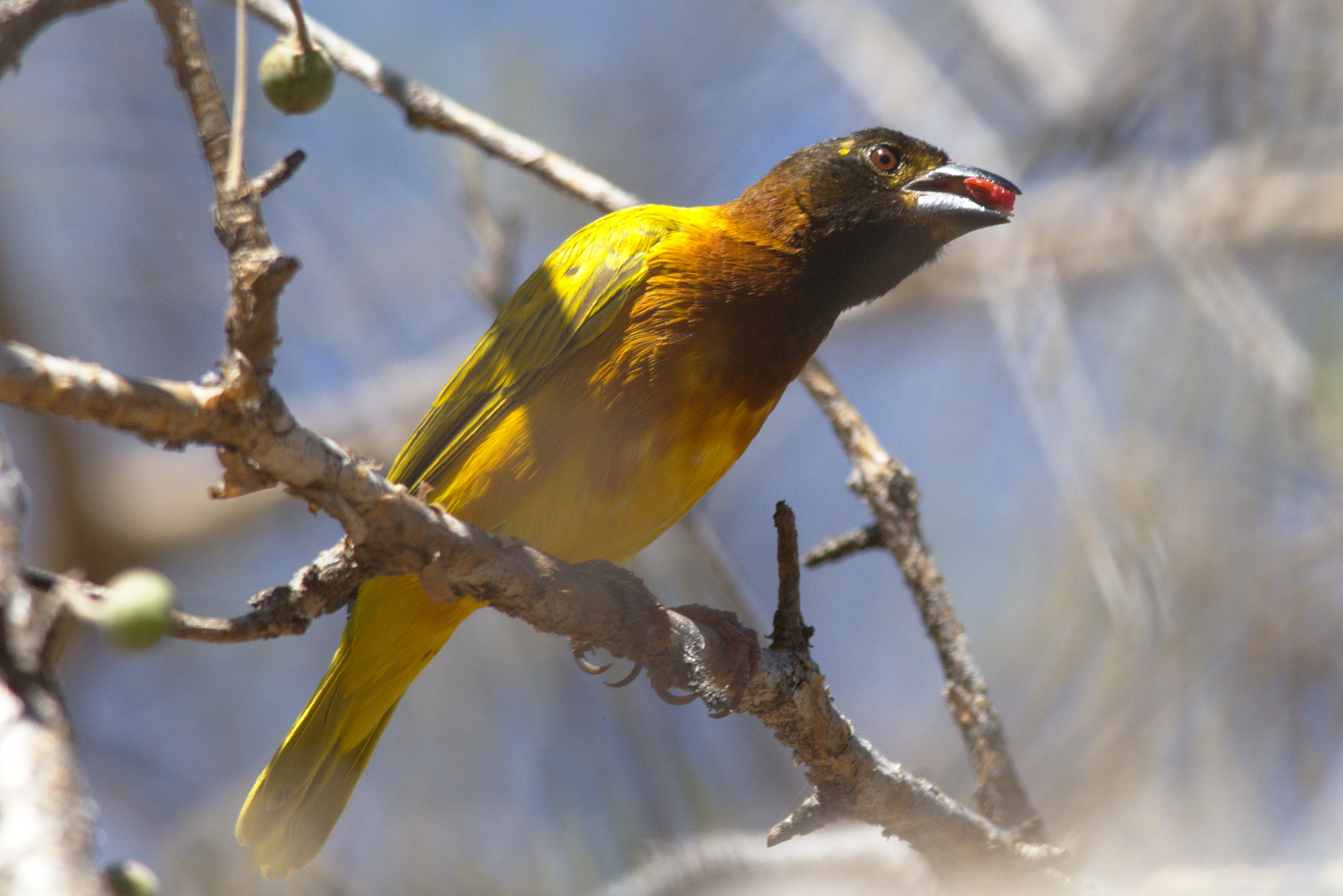
- Male at the Dawa River, southern Ethiopia

Conservation status
- Least Concern (IUCN 3.1)

Scientific classification
- Kingdom: Animalia
- Phylum: Chordata
- Class: Aves
- Order: Passeriformes
- Family: Ploceidae
- Genus: Ploceus
- Species: P. dichrocephalus

Binomial name
- Ploceus dichrocephalus (Salvadori, 1896)

= Juba weaver =

Species of bird

The Juba weaver (Ploceus dichrocephalus), also known as Salvadori's weaver, is a species of bird in the family Ploceidae. It is found in the Horn of Africa.
