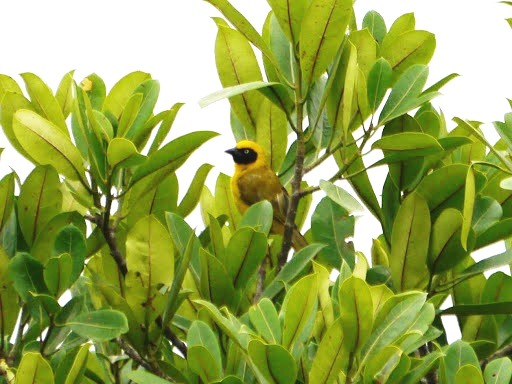

Conservation status
- Vulnerable (IUCN 3.1)

Scientific classification
- Kingdom: Animalia
- Phylum: Chordata
- Class: Aves
- Order: Passeriformes
- Family: Ploceidae
- Genus: Ploceus
- Species: P. bannermani

Binomial name
- Ploceus bannermani Chapin, 1932

= Bannerman's weaver =

Species of bird

Bannerman's weaver (Ploceus bannermani) is a species of bird in the weaver family, Ploceidae. It is native to the Western High Plateau. Its natural habitat is subtropical or tropical moist montane forests. It is threatened by habitat loss.

Its scientific and common names honor the ornithologist David Armitage Bannerman.
