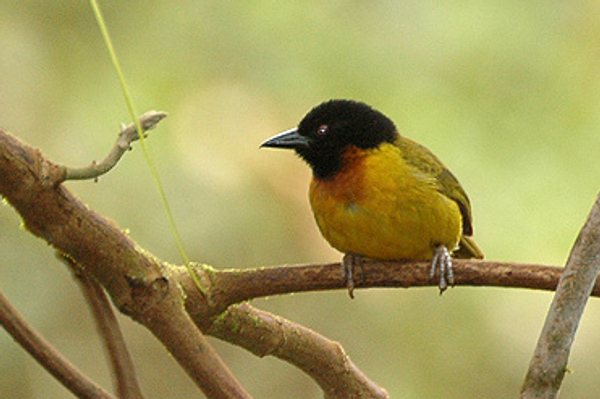

Conservation status
- Least Concern (IUCN 3.1)

Scientific classification
- Kingdom: Animalia
- Phylum: Chordata
- Class: Aves
- Order: Passeriformes
- Family: Ploceidae
- Genus: Ploceus
- Species: P. alienus

Binomial name
- Ploceus alienus (Sharpe, 1902)

= Strange weaver =

Species of bird

The strange weaver (Ploceus alienus) is a species of bird in the family Ploceidae. It is found in the Albertine Rift montane forests.
