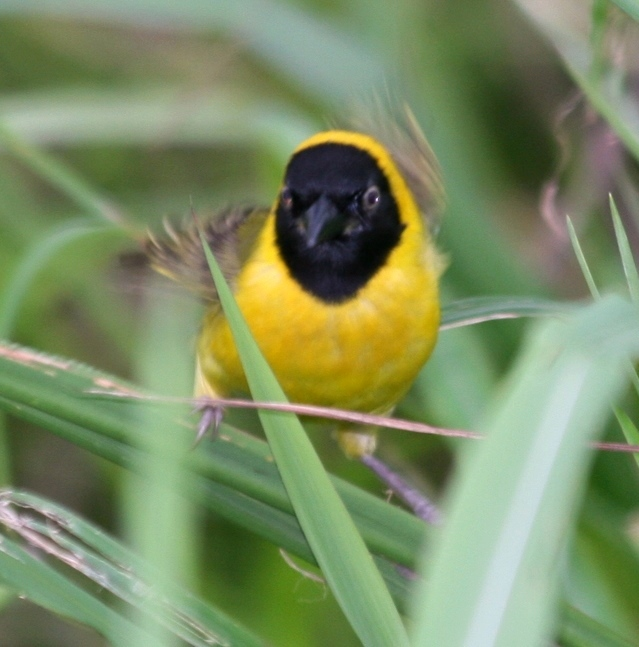

Conservation status
- Vulnerable (IUCN 3.1)

Scientific classification
- Kingdom: Animalia
- Phylum: Chordata
- Class: Aves
- Order: Passeriformes
- Family: Ploceidae
- Genus: Ploceus
- Species: P. subpersonatus

Binomial name
- Ploceus subpersonatus (Cabanis, 1876)

= Loango weaver =

Species of bird

The Loango weaver (Ploceus subpersonatus) is a species of bird in the family Ploceidae. It is found in Angola, Republic of the Congo, Democratic Republic of the Congo, and Gabon. Its natural habitats are subtropical or tropical dry forests, dry savanna, and swamps. It is threatened by habitat loss.

It is estimated that there are somewhere between 2,500 and 10,000 of the bird in existence, so it is listed as a vulnerable species.
