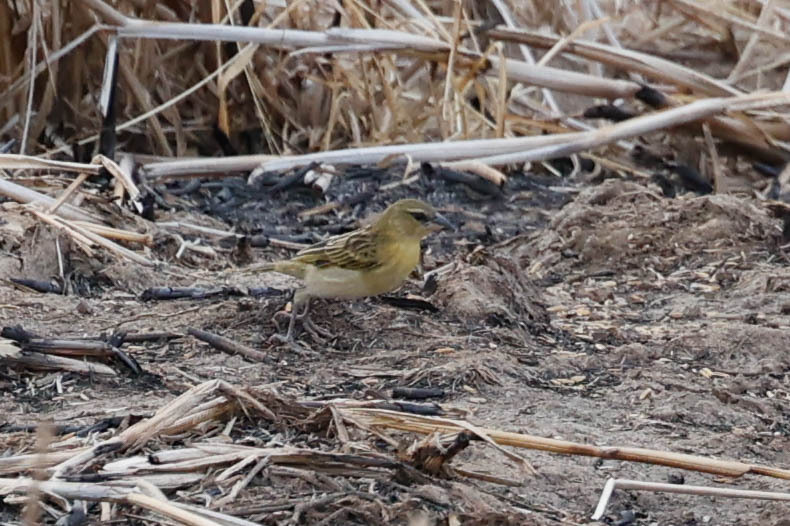

Conservation status
- Vulnerable (IUCN 3.1)

Scientific classification
- Kingdom: Animalia
- Phylum: Chordata
- Class: Aves
- Order: Passeriformes
- Family: Ploceidae
- Genus: Ploceus
- Species: P. burnieri

Binomial name
- Ploceus burnieri N.E. Baker & E.M. Baker, 1990

= Kilombero weaver =

Species of bird

The Kilombero weaver (Ploceus burnieri) is a species of bird in the family Ploceidae. It is endemic to the alluvial plain of the Ulanga River in Tanzania.

Its natural habitat is swamps. It is threatened by habitat loss.
