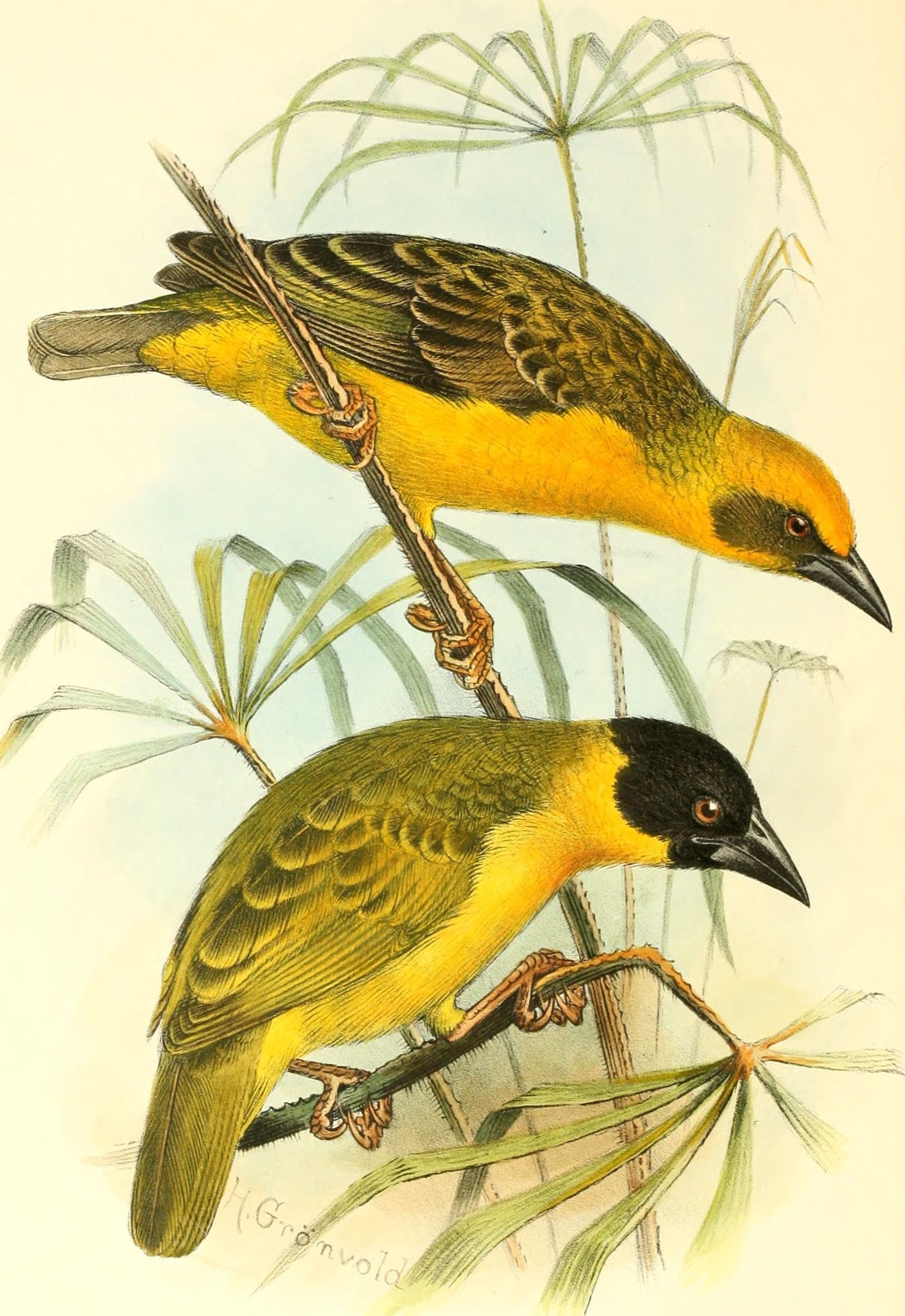
- Bocage's weaver (P. temporalis) and Bertram's weaver (P. bertrandi) ♀

Scientific classification
- Kingdom: Animalia
- Phylum: Chordata
- Class: Aves
- Order: Passeriformes
- Family: Ploceidae
- Genus: Ploceus; Cuvier, 1816

Type species
- Loxia philippina Linnaeus, 1766

Species
- See text

Synonyms
- Hyphanthurgus Sundevall, 1872; Hyphanturgus Cabanis, 1851; Nelicurvius Bonaparte, 1850; Nelicurvus Pollen, 1863; Notiospiza Oberholser, 1905; Othyphantes Shelley, 1896; Pachyphantes Shelley, 1896; Phormoplectes Reichenow, 1903; Ploceus victoriae Ash, 1986; Ploceys Billberg, 1828; Ploceëlla Oates, 1874; Plocion Merrem, 1826; Plocus Lafresnaye, 1835; Sharpia Barboza de Bocage, 1878; Simplectes Lesson, 1844; Sitagra Reichenbach, 1850; Sitagroides Roberts, 1947; Sycobrotus Cabanis, 1851; Symplectes Swainson, 1837; Textor Temminck, 1827; Thomasophantes Sclater, 1925

= Ploceus =

Genus of birds

Ploceinae, 1st group

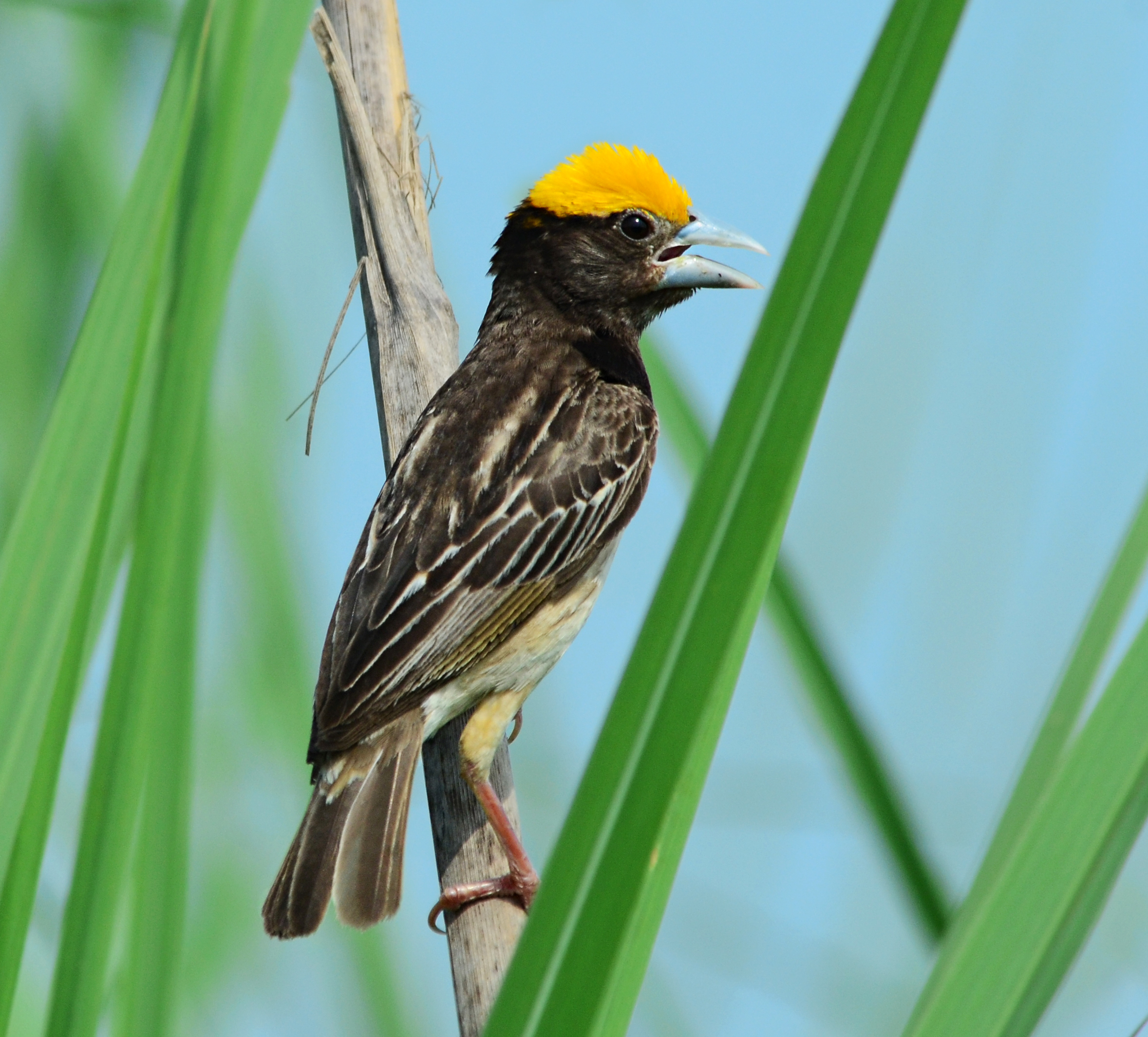
Black-breasted weaver
"true Ploceus"

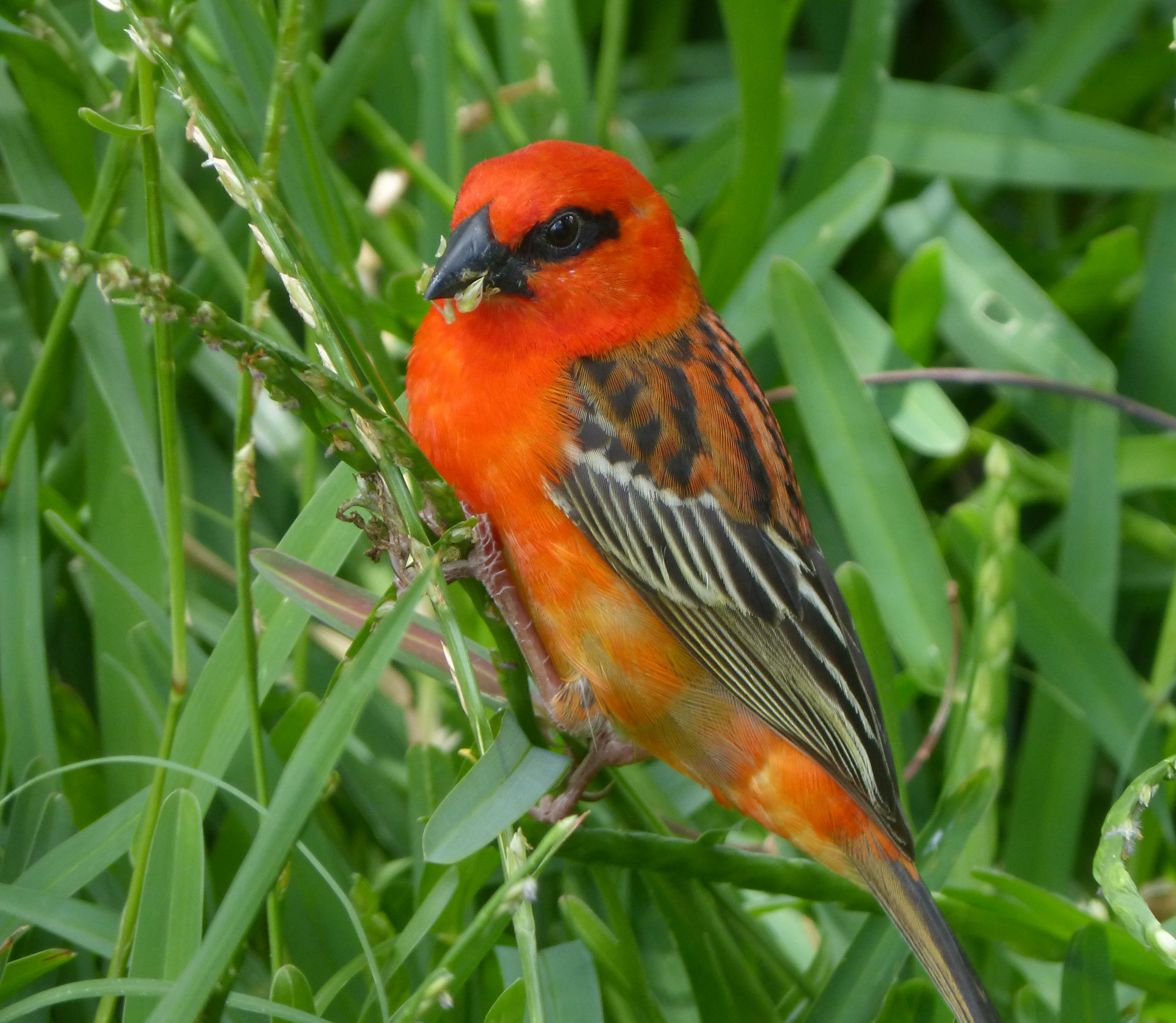
Madagascar fody
(genus Foudia)

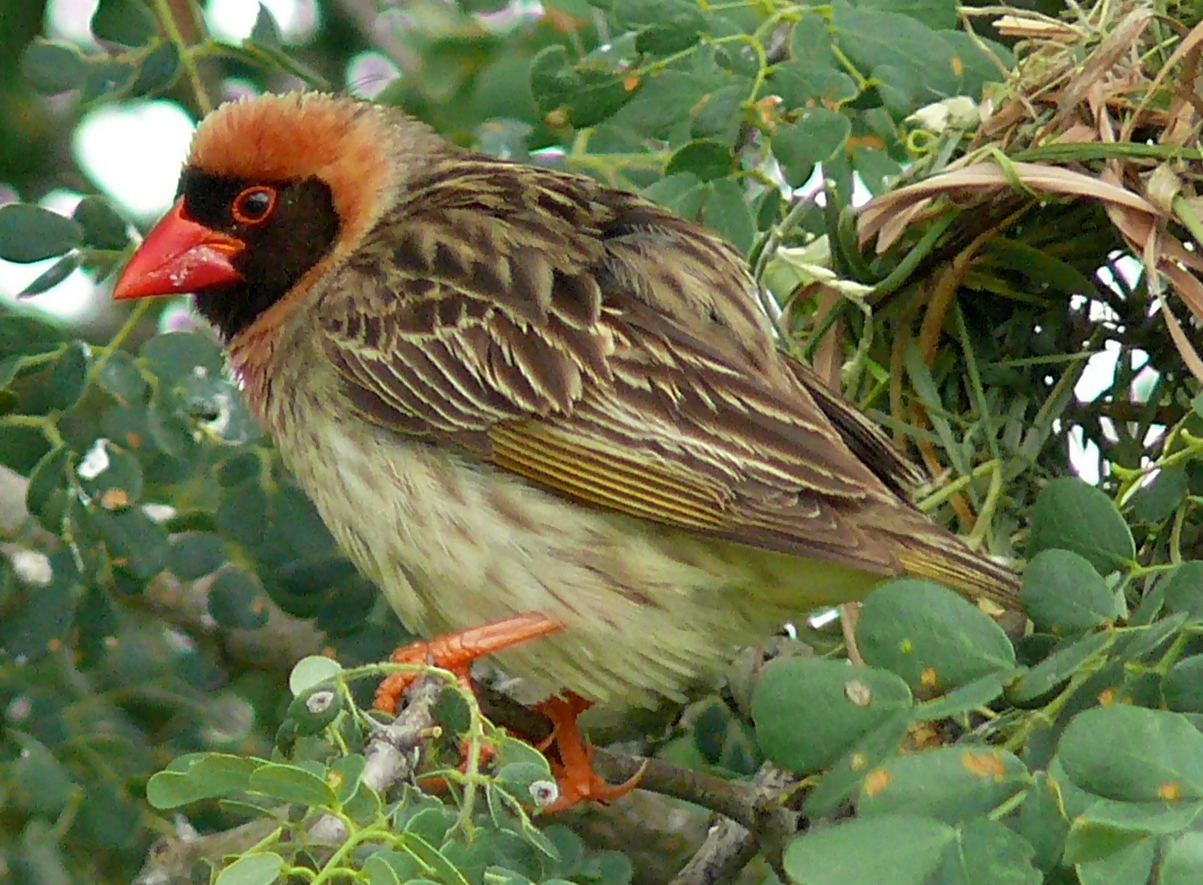
Red-billed quelea
(genus Quelea)

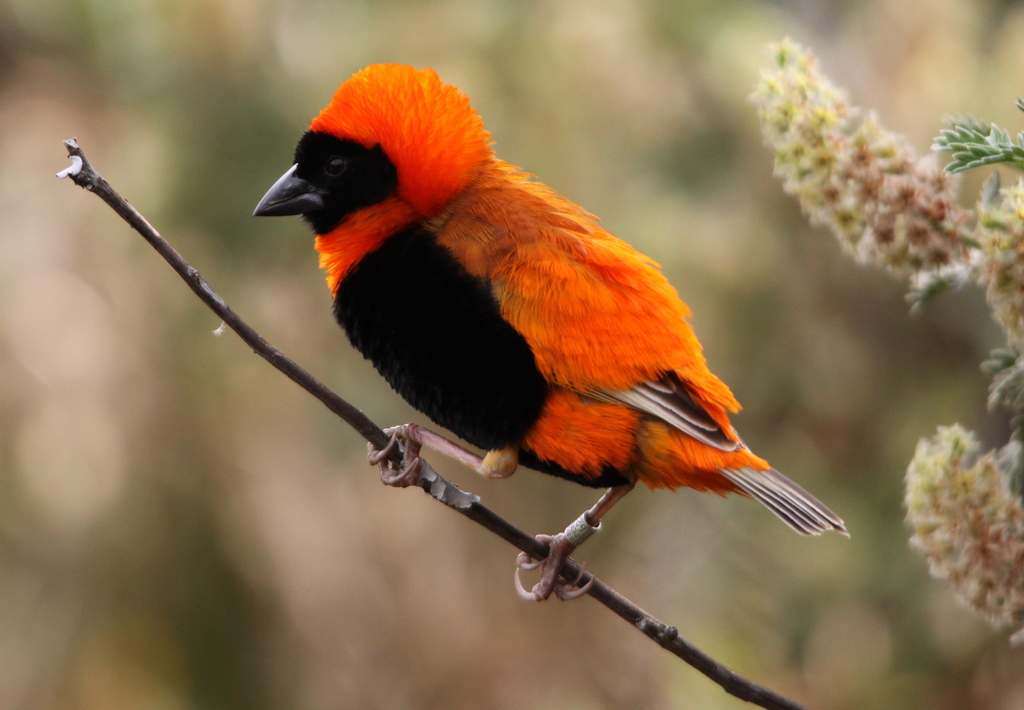
Southern red bishop
(genus Euplectes)

Ploceinae, 2nd group

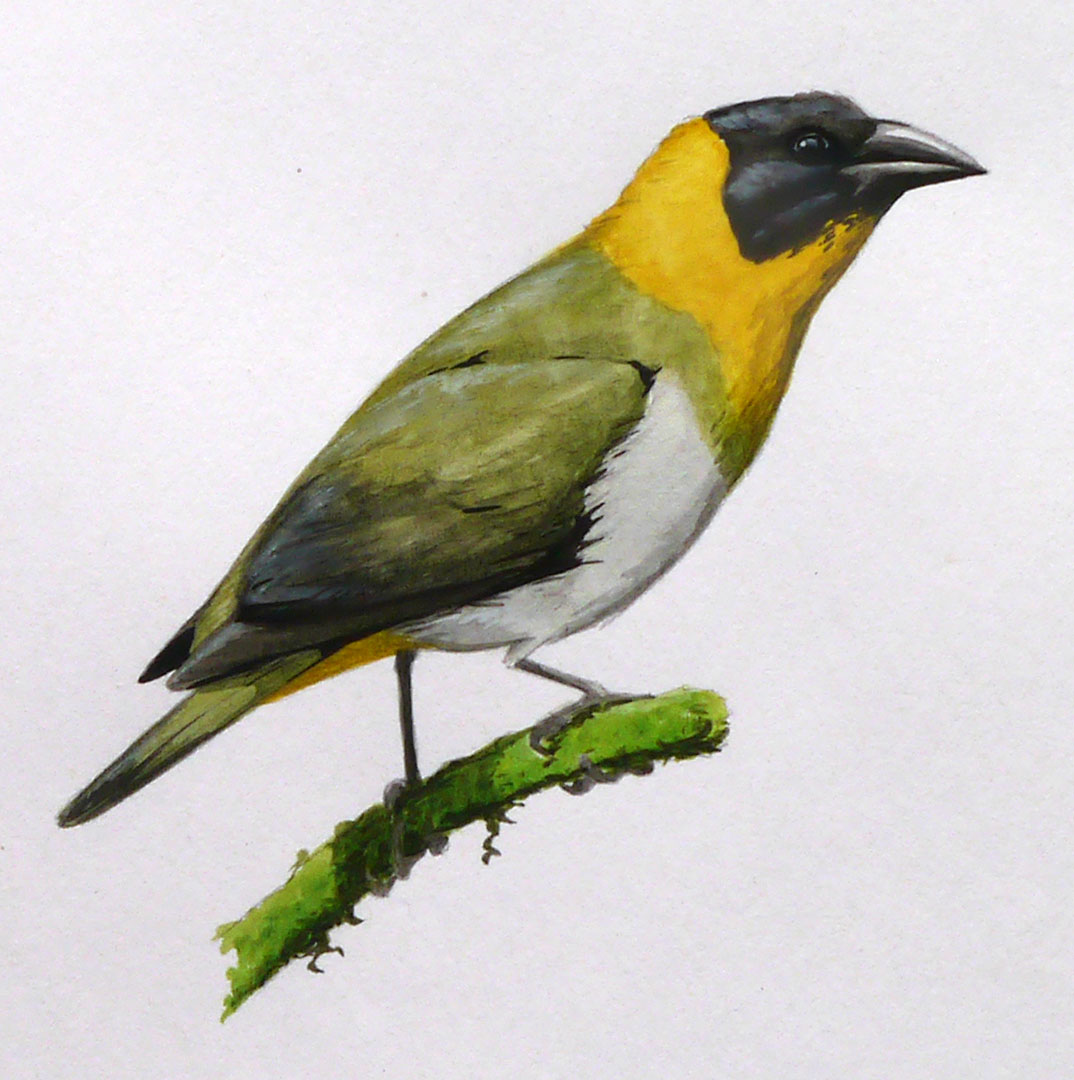
Nelicourvi weaver
(genus Ploceus)
"reinstated Nelicurvius"

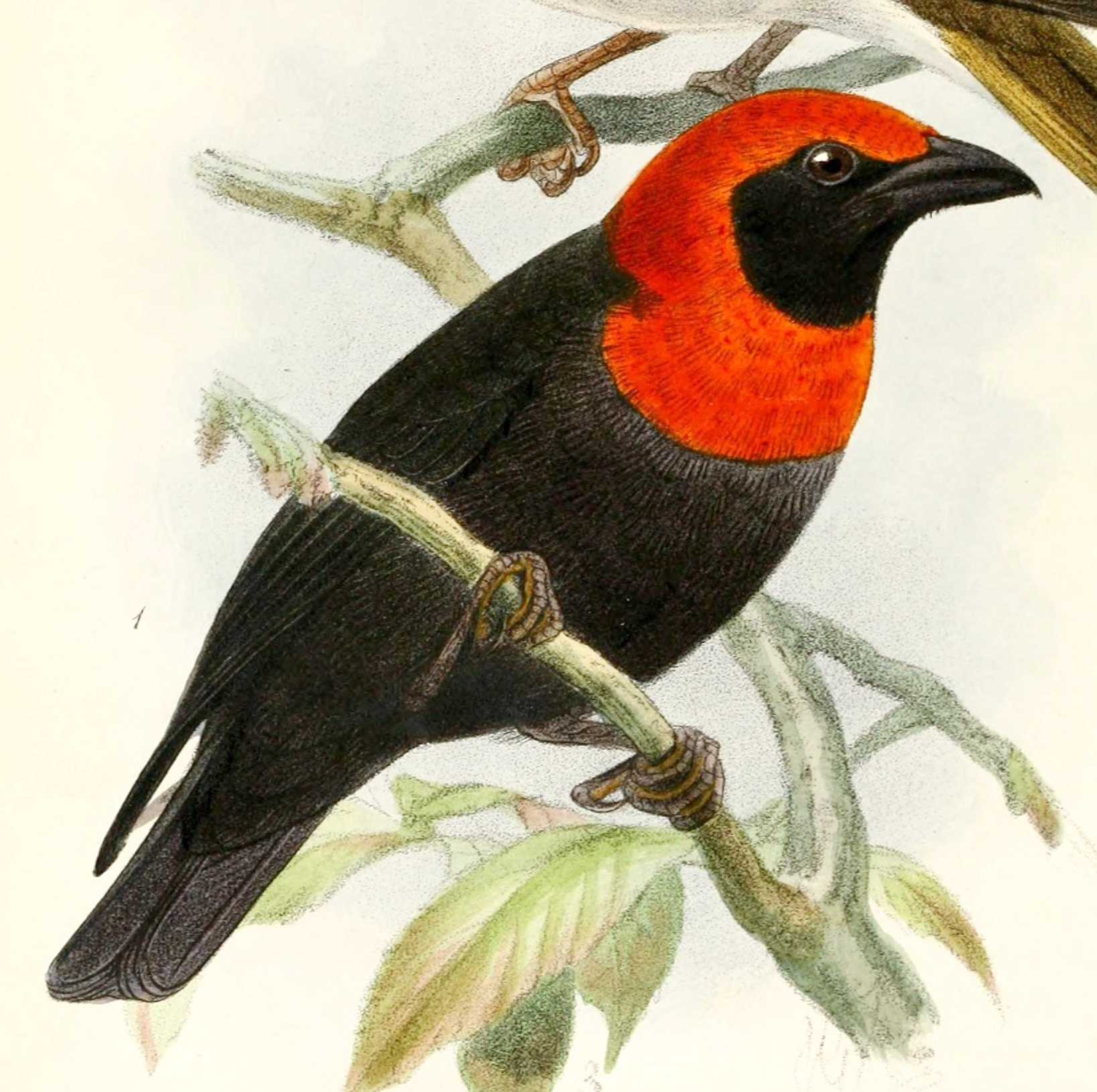
Cassin's malimbe
(genus Malimbus)
"extended Malimbus"

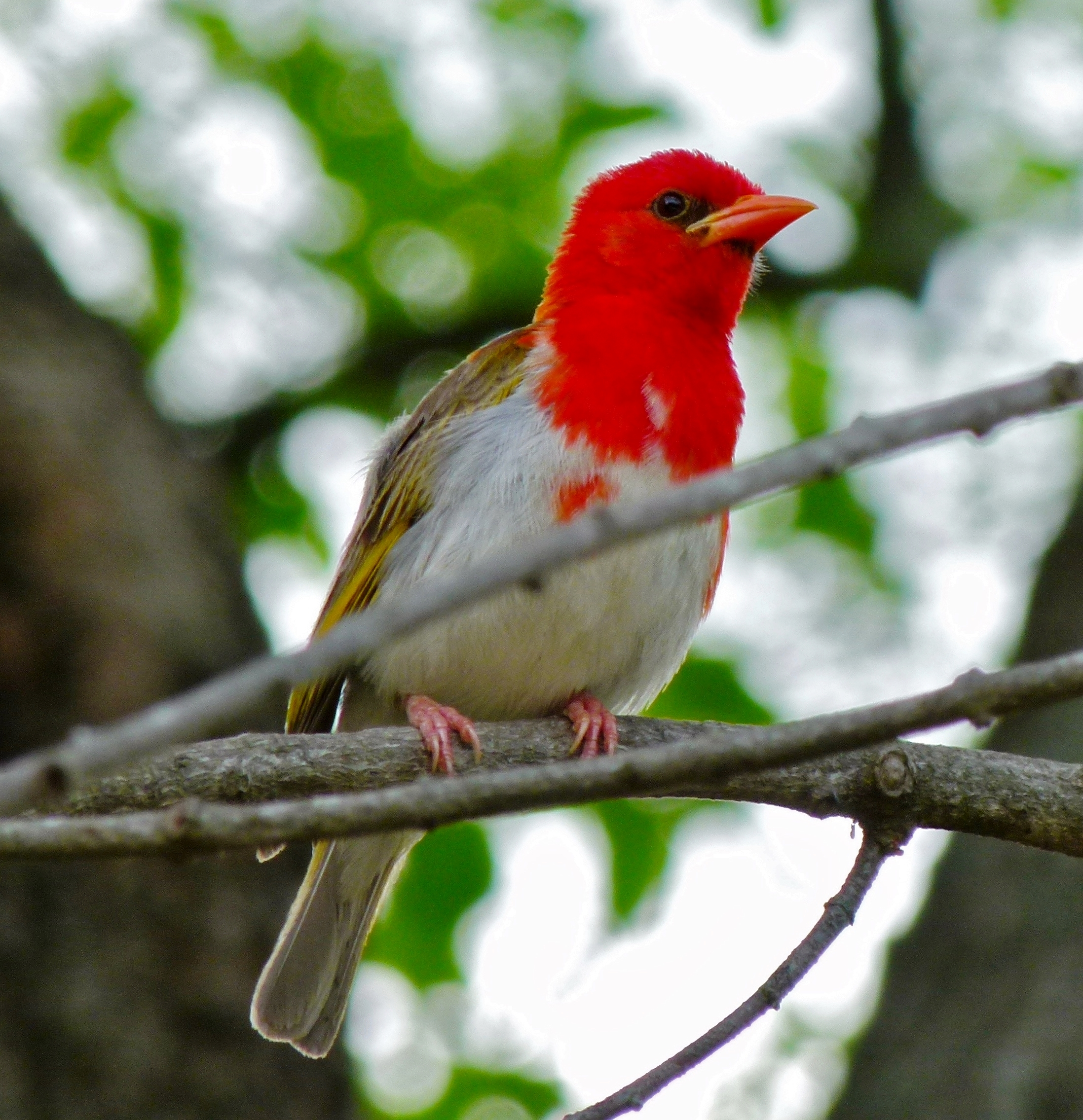
Red-headed weaver
(genus Anaplectes)
"extended Malimbus"

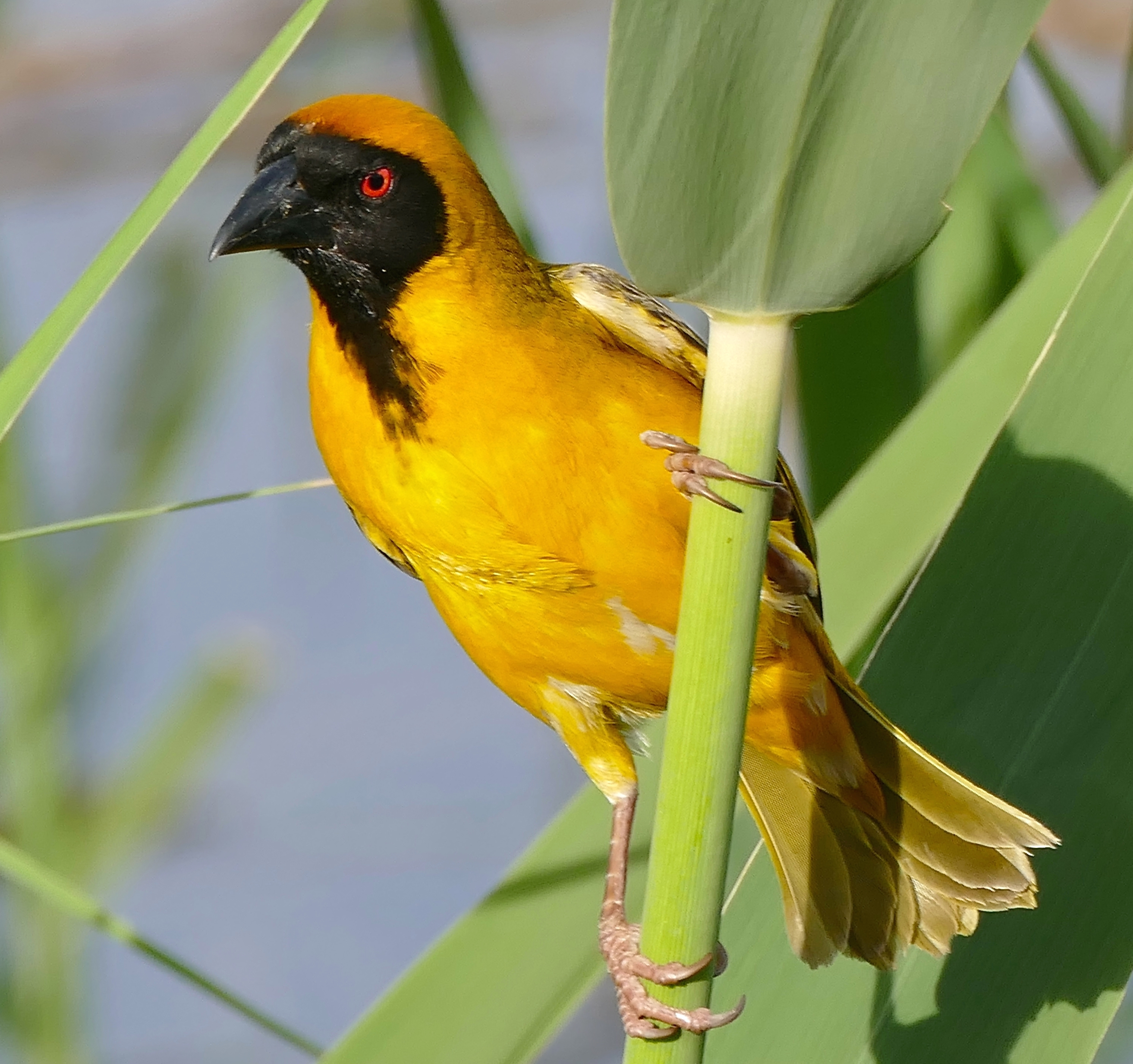
Southern masked weaver
(genus Ploceus)
"extended Malimbus"

Ploceus is a genus of birds in the weaver family, Ploceidae. They are native to the Indomalayan and Afrotropical realms.

== Taxonomy and systematics ==
=== Phylogeny ===
The genus Ploceus was introduced by the French naturalist Georges Cuvier in 1816. The type species was subsequently designated as the baya weaver. The genus name is a Latinisation of Ancient Greek πλοκεύς (plokeús) meaning "one who braids hair", which in turn is derived from the Greek verb πλέκω (plékō) "plait, braid; entwine, intertwine".

Based on recent DNA-analysis, the genus Ploceus is almost certainly polyphyletic. If all species currently included in the genus would remain and the genus would be made monophyletic, it would have to encompass the entire subfamily Ploceinae. The Ploceinae can be divided into two groups. In the first group, the widowbirds and bishops (genus Euplectes) are sister to a clade in which the genera Foudia and Quelea are closest relatives and which further includes the Asiatic species of Ploceus, i.e. P. manyar, P. philippinus, P. benghalensis, P. megarhynchus, (and P. hypoxanthus, although untested). Since Georges Cuvier picked P. philippinus as the type species, these five species would logically remain assigned to the genus Ploceus.

Basic to the second group is a clade consisting of both species so far included in Ploceus that live on Madagascar, P. nelicourvi and P. sakalava, and these are morphologically very distinct from the remaining species. These two species could in future be assigned to the genus Nelicurvius that was erected by Charles Lucien Bonaparte in 1850, but which was merged with Ploceus later on. This second group further contains the genera Malimbus and Anaplectes, and all remaining Ploceus species. As Malimbus is the earlier name, erected by Vieillot et al. in 1805, the remaining species of Ploceus, as well as Anaplectes rubiceps, could in future be assigned to Malimbus. These changes are largely corroborated by morphological revisions. Provided that the other genera that have not been proposed to be merged into an extended "Malimbus" are monophyletic, the following (incomplete) tree expresses current insights.

- subfamily Ploceinae
  - - - - "true Ploceus"
          - P. megarhynchus
          - - P. benghalensis
            - - P. manyar
              - P. philippinus
        - - genus Foudia
          - genus Quelea
      - genus Euplectes
  - - "reinstated Nelicurvius"
      - P. nelicourvi
      - P. sakalava
    - "extended Malimbus"
      - - - - Malimbus malimbicus
            - Malimbus nitens
          - - - Malimbus cassini
              - Malimbus racheliae
            - - - Anaplectes rubiceps
                - P. bicolor
              - - - Malimbus rubricollis
                  - P. albinucha
                - - P. insignis
                  - P. olivaceiceps
      - - - - P. xanthops
            - - P. velatus
              - P. subaureus
          - - P. nigricollis
            - - P. ocularis
              - - - - P. pelzelni
                    - P. luteolus
                  - - P. melanogaster
                    - P. alienus
        - - P. vitellinus
          - - P. rubiginosus
            - - P. aurantius
              - - - P. bertrandi
                  - P. baglafecht
                - - - P. nigerrimus
                    - P. weynsi
                  - - P. cucullatus
                    - - - P. castaneiceps
                        - P. xanthopterus
                      - - P. heuglini
                        - - P. taeniopterus
                          - P. melanocephalus
                          - P. castanops

=== Species list ===
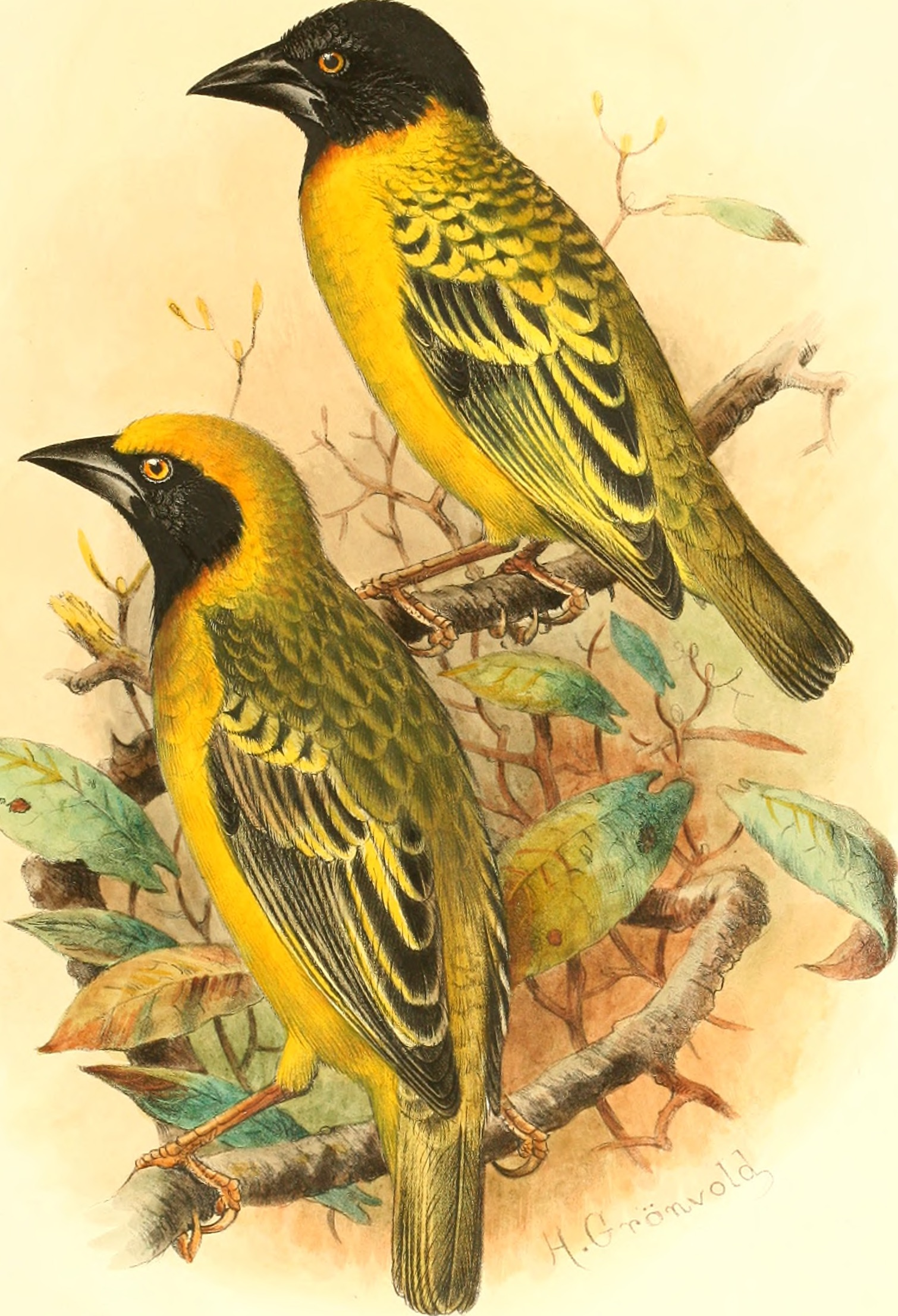
Speke's weaver (Ploceus spekei, below) and village weaver (Ploceus cucullatus subsp. nigriceps)

The genus contains the following 66 species.

Image	Common name	Scientific name	Distribution
	Baglafecht weaver	Ploceus baglafecht	highlands of equatorial Africa
	Bannerman's weaver	Ploceus bannermani	Western High Plateau
	Bates's weaver	Ploceus batesi	Cameroon.
	Black-chinned weaver	Ploceus nigrimentus	Bailundu Highlands of western Angola, on the Batéké Plateau in Republic of the Congo, and in eastern Gabon.
	Bertram's weaver	Ploceus bertrandi	Malawi, Mozambique, Tanzania, and Zambia.
	Slender-billed weaver	Ploceus pelzelni	equatorial Africa
	Loango weaver	Ploceus subpersonatus	maritime Central Africa
	Little weaver	Ploceus luteolus	western Sudan (region) and East Africa
	Spectacled weaver	Ploceus ocularis	Sub-Saharan Africa (except west, south, Horn of Africa and Madagascar)
	Black-necked weaver	Ploceus nigricollis	equatorial Africa
	Olive-naped weaver	Ploceus brachypterus	West Africa
	Strange weaver	Ploceus alienus	Albertine Rift montane forests.
	Black-billed weaver	Ploceus melanogaster	central Africa.
	Cape weaver	Ploceus capensis	southern Africa.
	Bocage's weaver	Ploceus temporalis	Angola, southern Democratic Republic of the Congo and northwestern Zambia.
	Eastern golden weaver	Ploceus subaureus	highlands of eastern and south-eastern Africa.
	Holub's golden weaver	Ploceus xanthops	miombo and adjacent areas
	Orange weaver	Ploceus aurantius	African tropical rainforest.
	Heuglin's masked weaver	Ploceus heuglini	Senegal, Gambia and Mali to Ivory Coast and east to Uganda and western Kenya.
	Golden palm weaver	Ploceus bojeri	eastern Africa.
	Taveta weaver	Ploceus castaneiceps	African Savannah in Kenya and Tanzania.
	Príncipe weaver	Ploceus princeps	São Tomé and Príncipe
	Northern brown-throated weaver	Ploceus castanops	Uganda, Rwanda and adjacent northern Burundi, eastern Democratic Republic of the Congo, western Kenya and northwestern Tanzania.
	Southern brown-throated weaver	Ploceus xanthopterus	southern Africa.
	Ruvu weaver	Ploceus holoxanthus	Tanzania
	Kilombero weaver	Ploceus burnieri	Tanzania
	Rüppell's weaver	Ploceus galbula	eastern Africa and southwestern Arabian Peninsula
	Northern masked weaver	Ploceus taeniopterus	Democratic Republic of the Congo, Ethiopia, Kenya, and Sudan.
	Lesser masked weaver	Ploceus intermedius	eastern, south-eastern and southern Africa.
	Southern masked weaver	Ploceus velatus	southern Africa.
	Katanga masked weaver	Ploceus katangae	south-eastern Democratic Republic of the Congo and northern Zambia.
	Lufira masked weaver	Ploceus ruweti	Democratic Republic of the Congo.
	Tanzanian masked weaver	Ploceus reichardi	south-western Tanzania and north-eastern Zambia.
	Vitelline masked weaver	Ploceus vitellinus	western, central and eastern Africa.
	Speke's weaver	Ploceus spekei	northern and eastern Somalia, Ethiopia, Kenya, and north-eastern Tanzania
	Fox's weaver	Ploceus spekeoides	Uganda.
	Village weaver	Ploceus cucullatus	Sub-Saharan Africa; introduced to Hispaniola, Dominica, Mauritius and Réunion.
	Giant weaver	Ploceus grandis	São Tomé Island.
	Chestnut-and-black weaver	Ploceus castaneofuscus	West Africa
	Vieillot's black weaver	Ploceus nigerrimus	Central Africa
	Weyns's weaver	Ploceus weynsi	eastern Democratic Republic of the Congo and north-western Tanzania.
	Kilifi weaver	Ploceus golandi	Kenya.
	Juba weaver	Ploceus dichrocephalus	Horn of Africa.
	Black-headed weaver	Ploceus melanocephalus	West, Central, and East Africa
	Golden-backed weaver	Ploceus jacksoni	Burundi, Kenya, South Sudan, Tanzania, and Uganda.
	Cinnamon weaver	Ploceus badius	Sudan and South Sudan
	Chestnut weaver	Ploceus rubiginosus	eastern and south-western Africa.
	Golden-naped weaver	Ploceus aureonucha	northeastern Democratic Republic of the Congo.
	Yellow-mantled weaver	Ploceus tricolor	African tropical rainforest.
	Maxwell's black weaver	Ploceus albinucha	African tropical rainforest.
	Nelicourvi weaver	Ploceus nelicourvi	Madagascar
	Sakalava weaver	Ploceus sakalava	Madagascar.
	Asian golden weaver	Ploceus hypoxanthus	Cambodia, Indonesia, Laos, Myanmar, Thailand, and Vietnam.
	Black-breasted weaver	Ploceus benghalensis	South Asia
	Streaked weaver	Ploceus manyar	Bangladesh, Bhutan, Cambodia, China, Egypt, India, Indonesia, Myanmar, Nepal, Pakistan, Singapore, Sri Lanka, Thailand, Vietnam
	Baya weaver	Ploceus philippinus	Indian Subcontinent and Southeast Asia.
	Finn's weaver	Ploceus megarhynchus	India and Nepal
	Dark-backed weaver	Ploceus bicolor	Sub-Saharan Africa (except west, south, Horn of Africa and Madagascar)
	Preuss's weaver	Ploceus preussi	Cameroon, Central African Republic, Republic of the Congo, DRC, Ivory Coast, Equatorial Guinea, Gabon, Ghana, Guinea, Liberia, and Sierra Leone.
	Yellow-capped weaver	Ploceus dorsomaculatus	Cameroon, Central African Republic, Republic of the Congo, Democratic Republic of the Congo, and Gabon.
	Olive-headed weaver	Ploceus olivaceiceps	Malawi, Mozambique, Tanzania, and Zambia.
	Usambara weaver	Ploceus nicolli	Tanzania.
	Brown-capped weaver	Ploceus insignis	Western High Plateau, Albertine Rift montane forests, Imatong Mountains and Kenya
	Bar-winged weaver	Ploceus angolensis	Angola, Democratic Republic of the Congo, and Zambia.
	São Tomé weaver	Ploceus sanctithomae	São Tomé and Príncipe.
	Yellow-legged weaver	Ploceus flavipes	Democratic Republic of the Congo.
