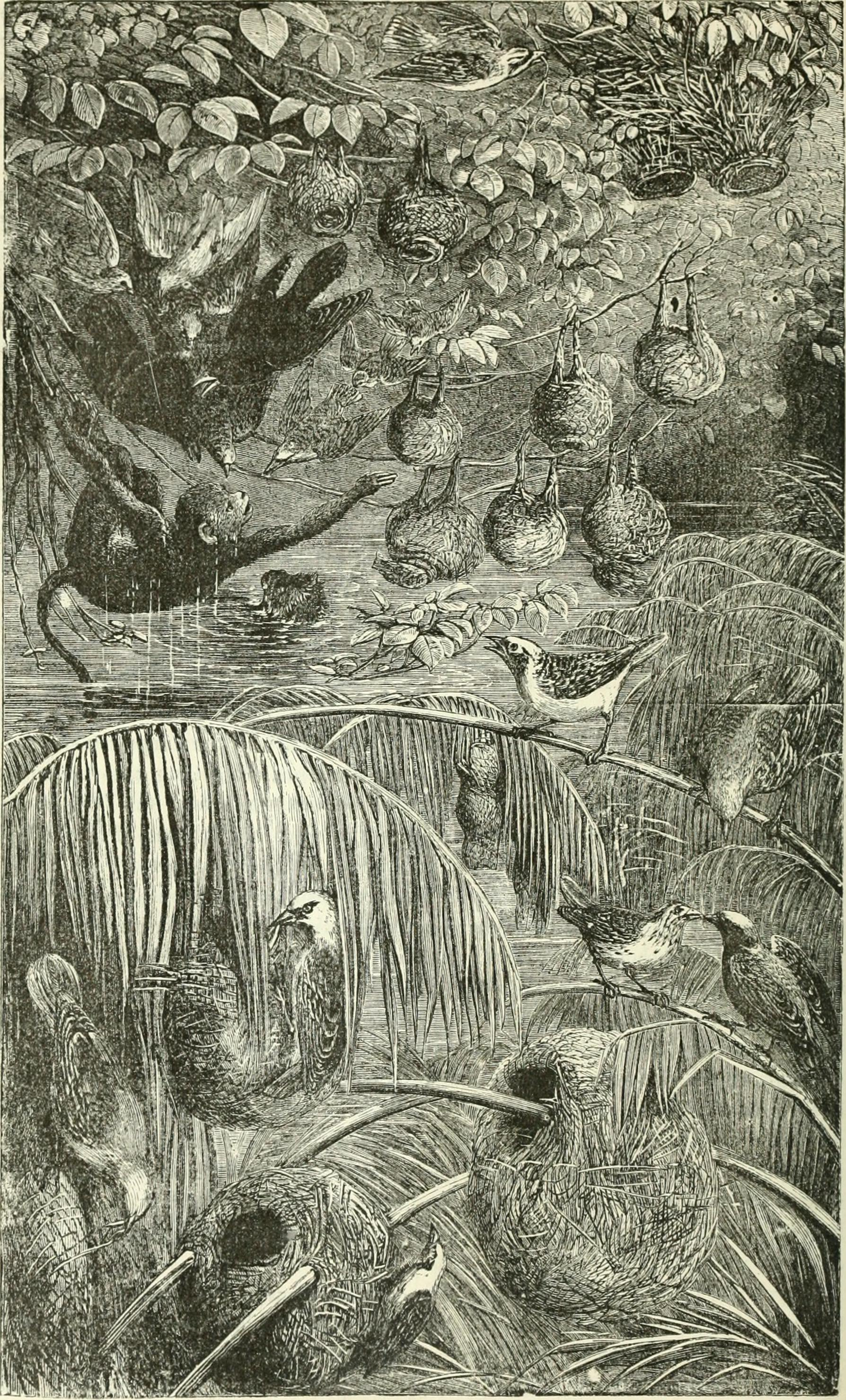
- Illustration from Hartwig & Hudson (1874) showing nest of yellow-capped weaver at bottom center

Conservation status
- Least Concern (IUCN 3.1)

Scientific classification
- Kingdom: Animalia
- Phylum: Chordata
- Class: Aves
- Order: Passeriformes
- Family: Ploceidae
- Genus: Ploceus
- Species: P. dorsomaculatus

Binomial name
- Ploceus dorsomaculatus (Reichenow, 1893)

= Yellow-capped weaver =

Species of bird

The yellow-capped weaver (Ploceus dorsomaculatus) is a species of bird in the family Ploceidae. It is found in Cameroon, Central African Republic, Republic of the Congo, Democratic Republic of the Congo, and Gabon.
