= Golden-naped weaver =

Conservation status
- Endangered (IUCN 3.1)

Scientific classification
- Kingdom: Animalia
- Phylum: Chordata
- Class: Aves
- Order: Passeriformes
- Family: Ploceidae
- Genus: Ploceus
- Species: P. aureonucha

Binomial name
- Ploceus aureonucha Sassi, 1920

Species of bird

The golden-naped weaver (Ploceus aureonucha) is a species of bird in the family Ploceidae. It is native to the Ituri Rainforest in northeastern Democratic Republic of the Congo.

Its natural habitat is subtropical or tropical moist lowland forests. It is threatened by habitat loss.
