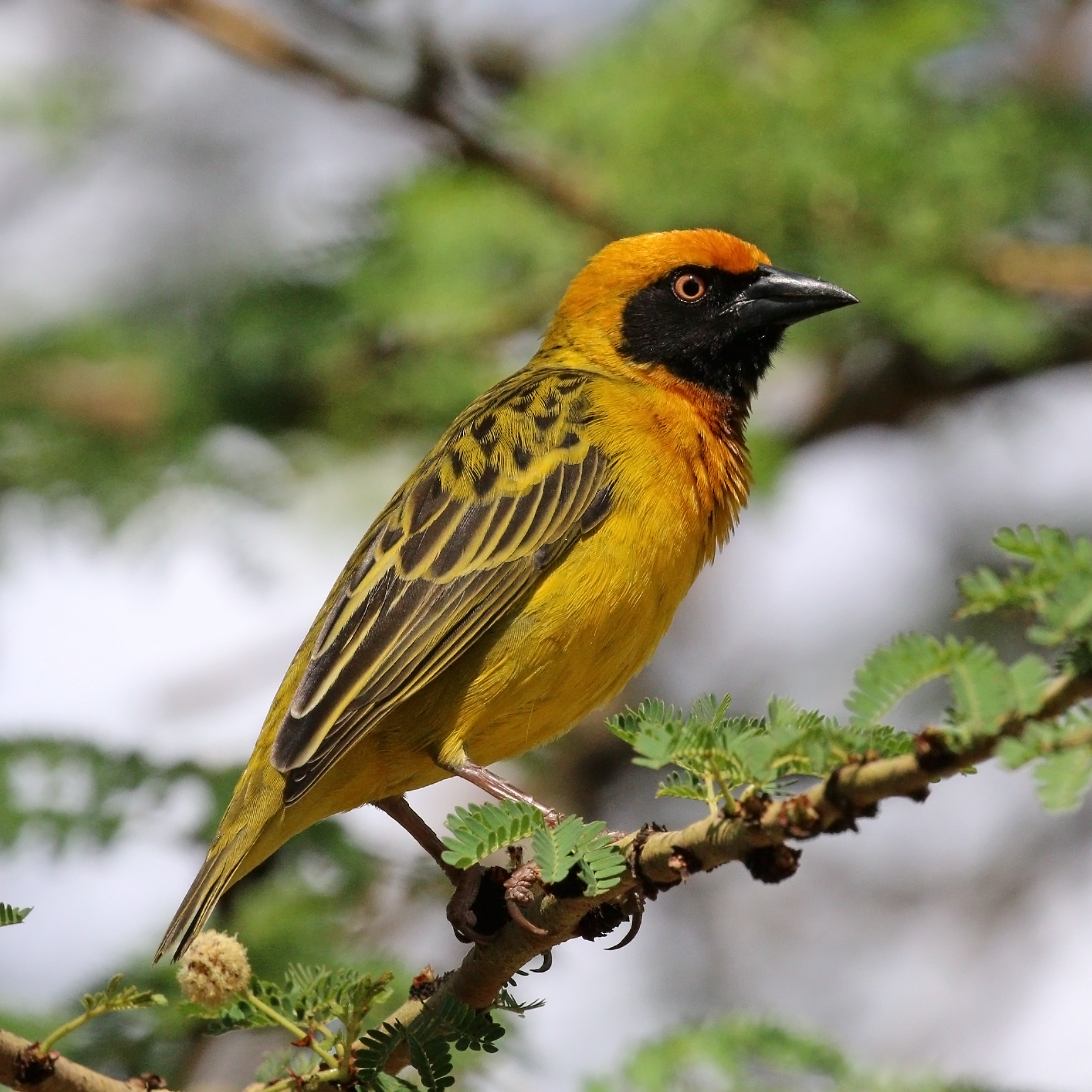
- An adult breeding male at Soysambu Conservancy, Kenya

Conservation status
- Least Concern (IUCN 3.1)

Scientific classification
- Kingdom: Animalia
- Phylum: Chordata
- Class: Aves
- Order: Passeriformes
- Family: Ploceidae
- Genus: Ploceus
- Species: P. spekei

Binomial name
- Ploceus spekei (Heuglin, 1861)

= Speke's weaver =

Species of bird

Speke's weaver (Ploceus spekei) is a familiar East African songbird.

The eyes are pale and the bill is on the large side for a weaver. Unlike many weavers, it has the same plumage all year. The adult male is yellow with black throat (edged rusty), face, and bill, and variable black mottling on the back. The adult female's upperparts are dull olive-gray with dusky brown streaks; the underparts are pale yellow, whiter on the belly and grayer on the flanks. The juvenile is similar but duller.

The song is variable; one version is transcribed as "pew…pew…tew, chinkichi-chewchew-skerinkitsitew". Calls include harsh chatter at the nest and a sharp "tseep!"

This species nests in colonies or occasionally singly. The nest, often woven in an acacia, is spherical with a short entrance tube opening sideways or downward. Many grass stems project sloppily, sometimes obscuring the shape. It nests in both the short rainy season and the middle of the long rainy season. Typical clutches comprise four eggs, which are unmarked deep blue, somewhat pointed at both ends, 24 to 26 mm long and 15 to 17 mm wide.

Speke's weaver is found in northern and eastern Somalia, Ethiopia, Kenya (mostly the central highlands), and north-eastern Tanzania. It inhabits savanna, bush, agricultural land, and towns. In parts of its range it is common, notably the densely populated area of Nairobi and environs, where it visits bird feeders.

This bird was named in honor of John Speke.

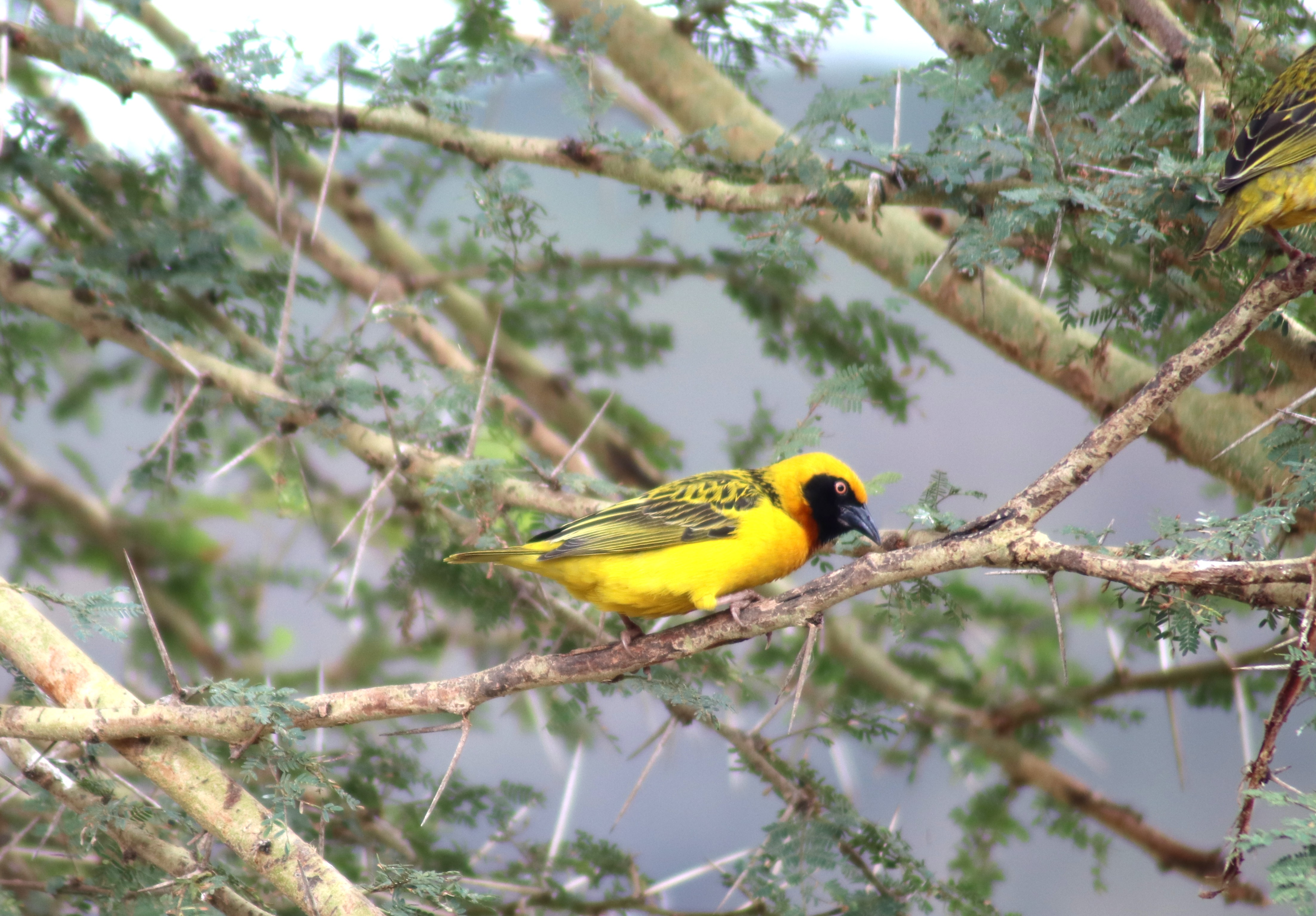
Adult male (Ngorogoro, Tanzania)

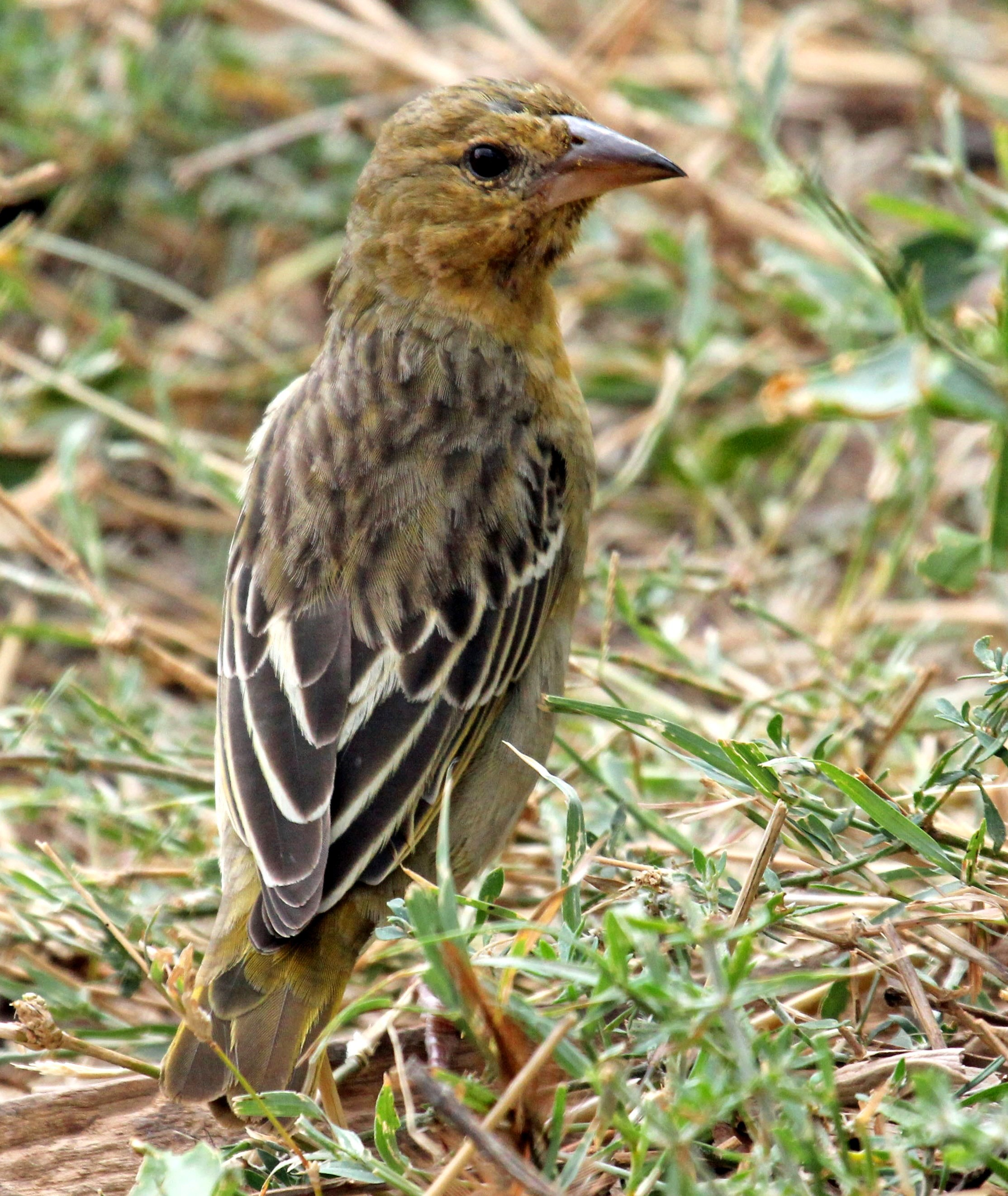
Immature bird with dark eye

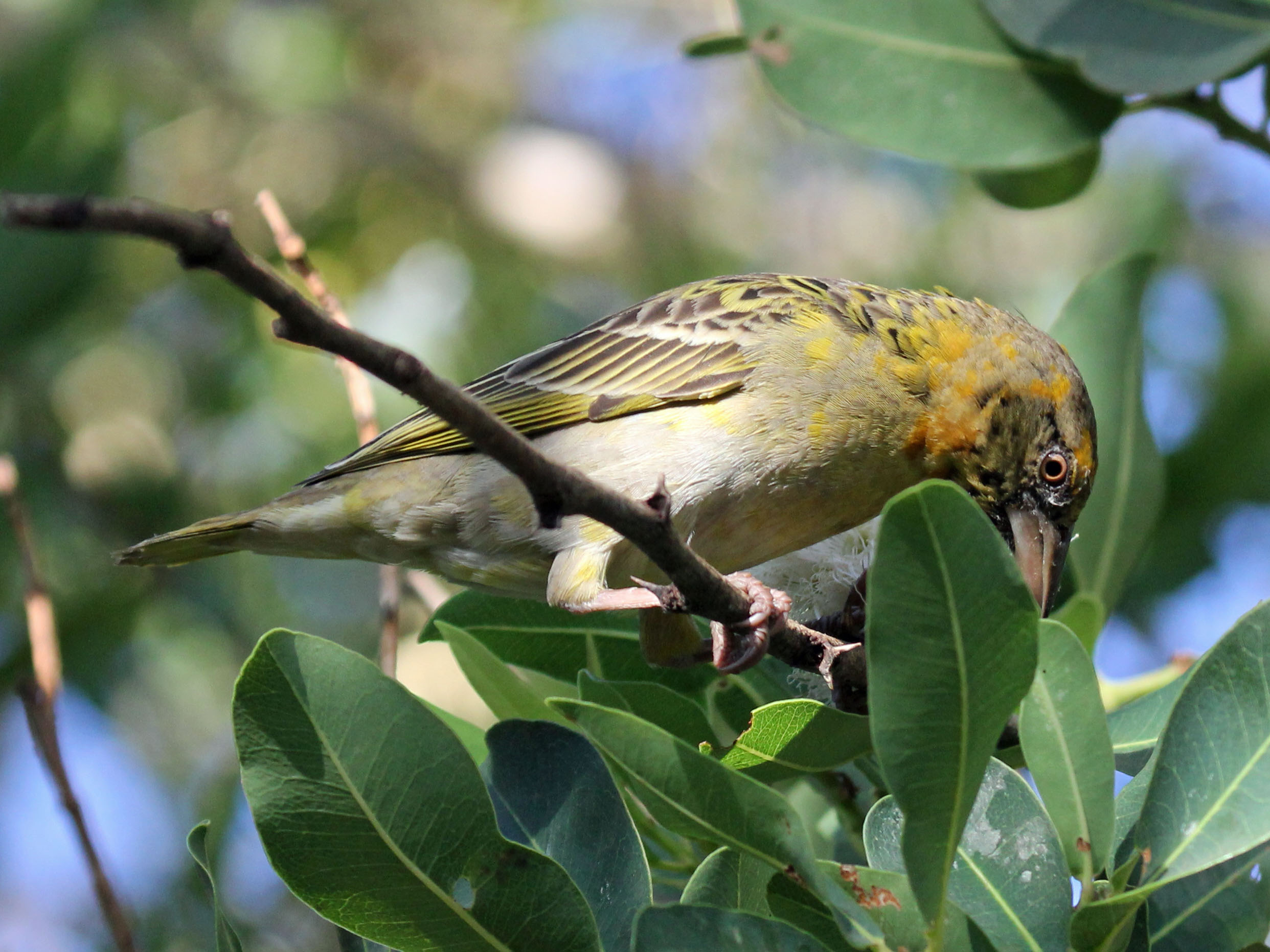
Adult male in eclipse plumage

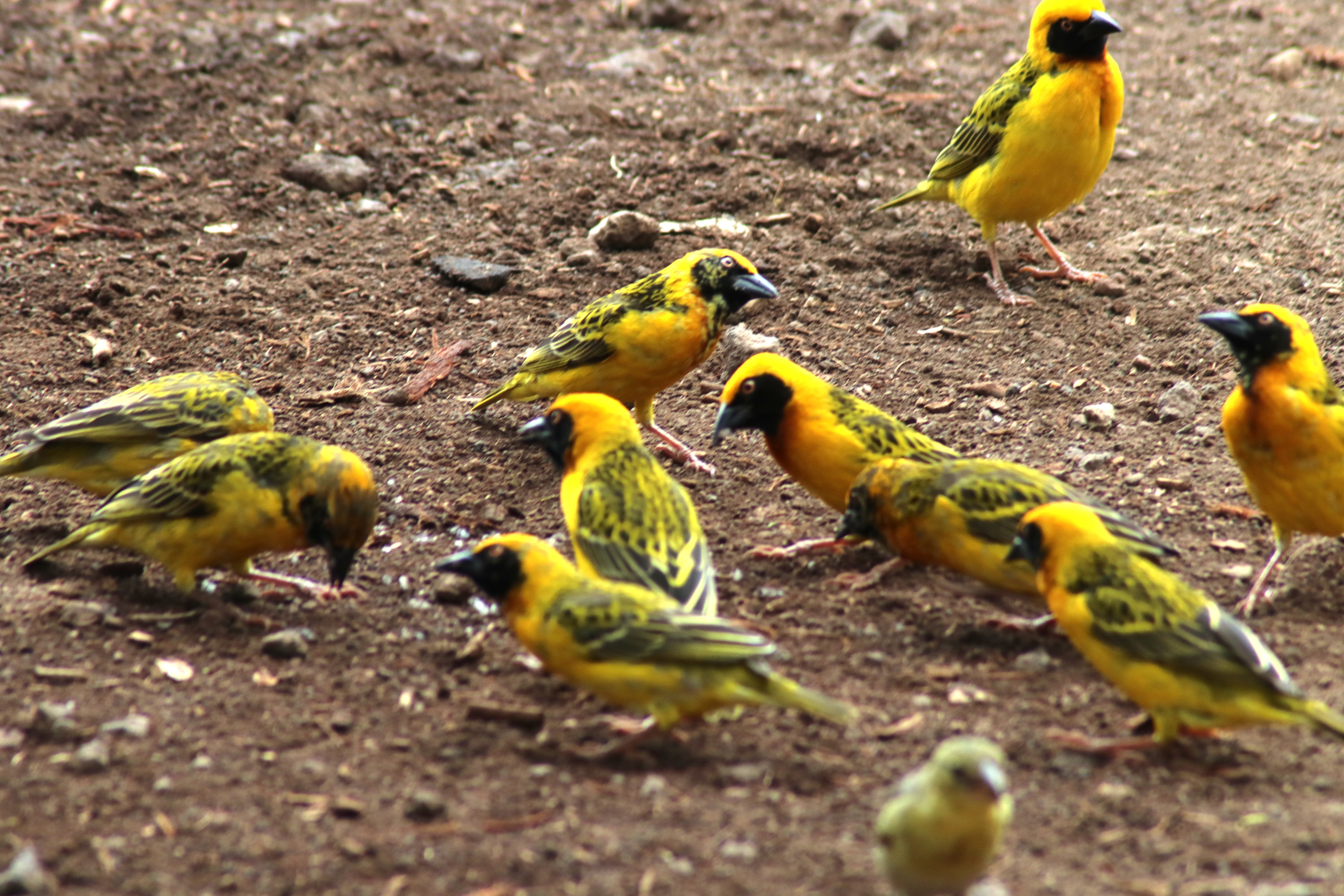
A group of Speke's weavers feeding, in Ngorogoro, Tanzania
