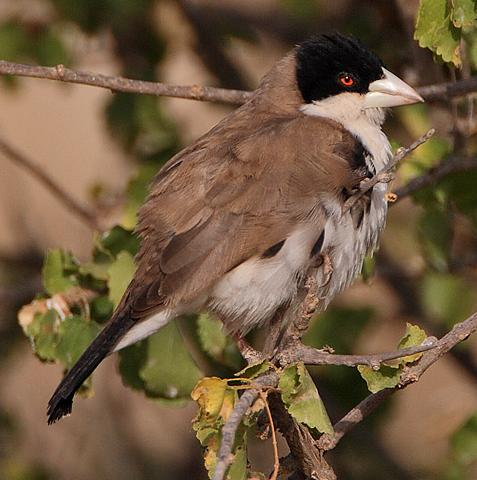

Conservation status
- Least Concern (IUCN 3.1)

Scientific classification
- Kingdom: Animalia
- Phylum: Chordata
- Class: Aves
- Order: Passeriformes
- Family: Ploceidae
- Genus: Pseudonigrita
- Species: P. cabanisi

Binomial name
- Pseudonigrita cabanisi (Fischer & Reichenow, 1884)

Synonyms
- Nigrita cabanisi; Somalita cabanisi

= Black-capped social weaver =

Species of bird

The black-capped social weaver (Pseudonigrita cabanisi) is a sparrow-like species of bird that has been assigned to the weaverbird family. It was originally described by Fisher and Reichenow, and later re-classified by the latter to the genus Pseudonigrita. Adults have a large black cap, ivory-colored bill, red eyes, brown back and wings, blackish-brown tail, white throat and underparts with a black midline, and dark horn-colored legs. It breeds in colonies and roofed nests with an entrance at the bottom in thorny trees such as acacias are constructed by the male from grass stems. It is found in parts of Ethiopia, Kenya, Somalia, and Tanzania. It is sometimes kept and bred in captivity.

== Taxonomy and systematics ==
In 1884, the black-capped social weaver was first described by German East-Africa explorer Gustav Fischer and German ornithologist Anton Reichenow as Nigrita cabanisi, based on a specimen collected in 1883 by Fischer in the Pare Mountains. In 1903, Reichenow assigned the species to his newly erected genus Pseudonigrita, because he considered P. arnaudi and P. cabanisi related to weaverbirds (Ploceidae), while the other species Nigrita bicolor, N. canicapillus, N. fusconota and N. luteifrons are negrofinches assigned to the estrildid finches. In 1942, Hans von Boetticher was of the opinion that our species was different enough to assign it to its own genus, and made the new combination Somalita cabanisi. The species name cabanisi, honors Jean Cabanis, a German ornithologist. There are no subtaxa.

"Black-capped social weaver" has been designated the official name by the International Ornithological Committee (IOC). Other common names include Cabanis's social waxbill and black-headed sociable weaver.

=== Phylogeny ===
Based on recent DNA-analysis (which did not include P. cabanisi), the genus Pseudonigrita belongs to the group of sparrow weavers (subfamily Plocepasserinae), and is most related to Philetairus socius. This clade is sister to Plocepasser. Provided that the sister relationship between the Pseudonigrita-species is correct, the following tree expresses current insights.

- family Ploceidae
  - subfamily Amblyospizinae
    Amblyospiza albifrons
  - - - subfamily Plocepasserinae
        - Sporopipes
        - - Plocepasser
          - - Philetairus socius
            - - Pseudonigrita cabanisi
              - Pseudonigrita arnaudi
      - - subfamily Bubalornithinae
          - Dinemellia dinemelli
          - Bubalornis
        - subfamily Ploceinae
          all other weaverbirds

== Description ==
The black-capped weaver is 13 cm (5.1 in) long and weighs 18–24 g (0.63–0.85 oz). Adult birds have an extensive and well-delimited black cap that runs from the bill opening, across the crown to the back neck, and also covers the area around the eye and ear. The neck, mantle, wings and rump are evenly brown. The tail is blackish brown. The throat, sides of the neck, breast, belly and vent are white. A clearly visible narrow longitudinal black stripe runs along the middle of belly to the stomach. Some black feathers also mark the side of the breast, but these are often difficult to see as they may partially or completely be covered by the wings. The legs are a dark horn color. The bill is ivory-colored. The eyes are bright red. Young birds miss the black markings entirely, which instead are the same brownish shade as the mantle and wings. The bill of juveniles is horn-colored and the iris is dark brown.

== Distribution and habitat ==
Pseudonigrita cabanisi occurs in central and southern Ethiopia, much of Kenya, a patch of Somalia towards the tripoint with Ethiopia and Kenya, and in northern Tanzania. The black-capped social weaver prefers semi-arid savannas dominated by acacias and other thorny bushes.

== Behaviour and ecology ==
The black-capped social weaver is monogamous and breeds in colonies. It feeds primarily on grass seeds, but also takes juicy vegetation to get enough water, and insects, particularly to feed the nestlings.

=== Breeding ===
Favoured nesting trees include Acacia-species, Delonix and Euphorbia, and the roofed nests that are constructed by both male and female, are attached from thin, hanging branches, and are made of many straight grass straws. Nests have two downward-facing entrances, one of which is closed as soon as the eggs are laid until the moment the youngsters fledge. A clutch is made of two to four eggs of 19 mm (0.75 in) long and 14 mm (0.55 in) in diameter, white or pinkish in color, with brown or violet markings.

== Aviculture ==
The black-capped social weaver is sometimes kept and bred in captivity by hobbyists. It can best be kept in a confinement without other bird species, since the best results can be reach with larger groups of this species. Contrary to the grey-capped social weaver, single pairs have been known to breed successfully however. The birds are also very tolerant, and can be combined with other species. A specialised website suggests to provide hanging branches that can be used to attach nests, without plant cover underneath. The rest of the cage may be planted with grass and a few tough shrubs. A large quantity of nesting material, such as grass straws, very thin twigs or coconut fibre must be provided for building the nests. The birds feed primarily on seeds with a smaller percentage of insects, but it is not known what the optimal mix is. In nature they also eat flowers, leaves and fruits, probably as a source of water when surface water is not available. In captivity, for instance cucumber and lettuce can be given. During the breeding season living insects, insect paste or shredded egg is needed to raise the chicks successfully. Fine stone grit and calcium sources, such as shell grit and cuttlebone, need to be provided. Due to its large demand in nesting material, excessive theft may occur if other Plocepasserinae-species are kept in the same confinement. This website notes that males sometimes throw chicks out of the nest. Replacing mealworms by small crickets may help combat this undesirable behaviour.

== Gallery ==
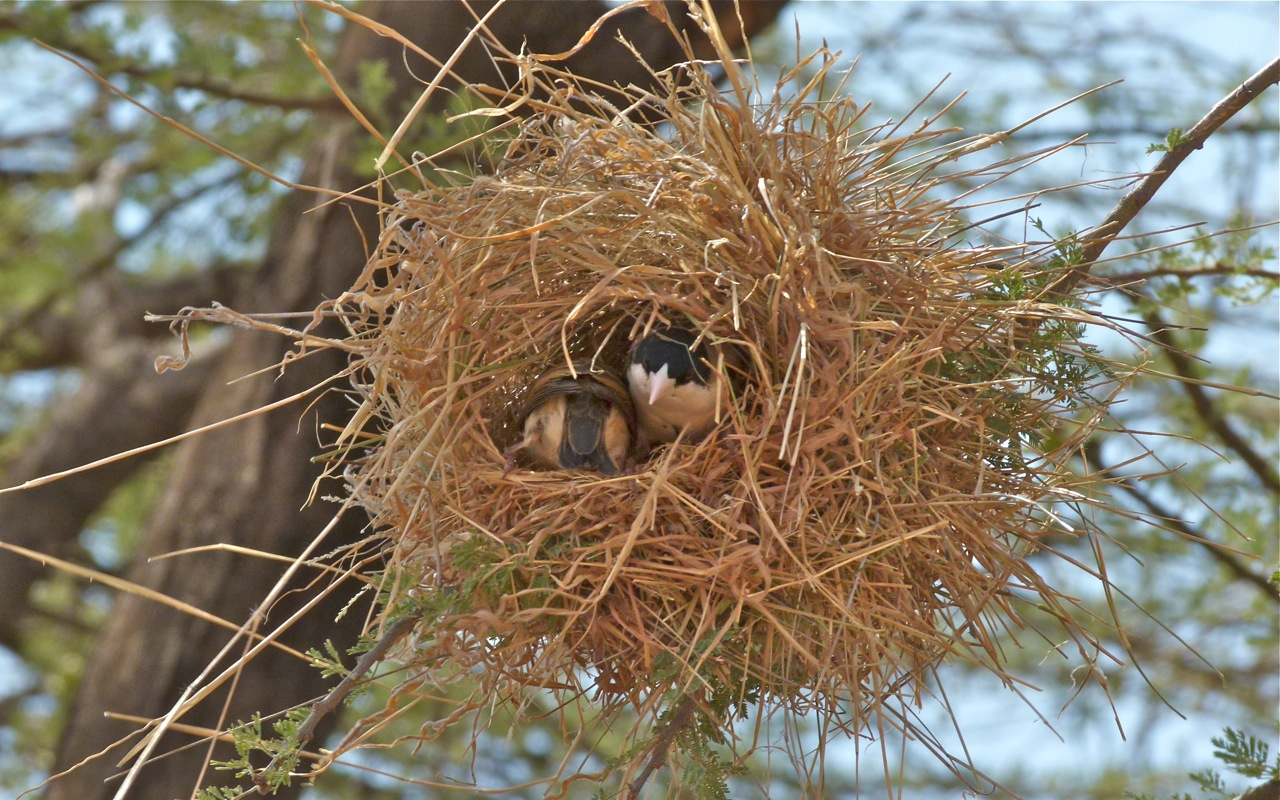
Black-capped social weavers building a nest

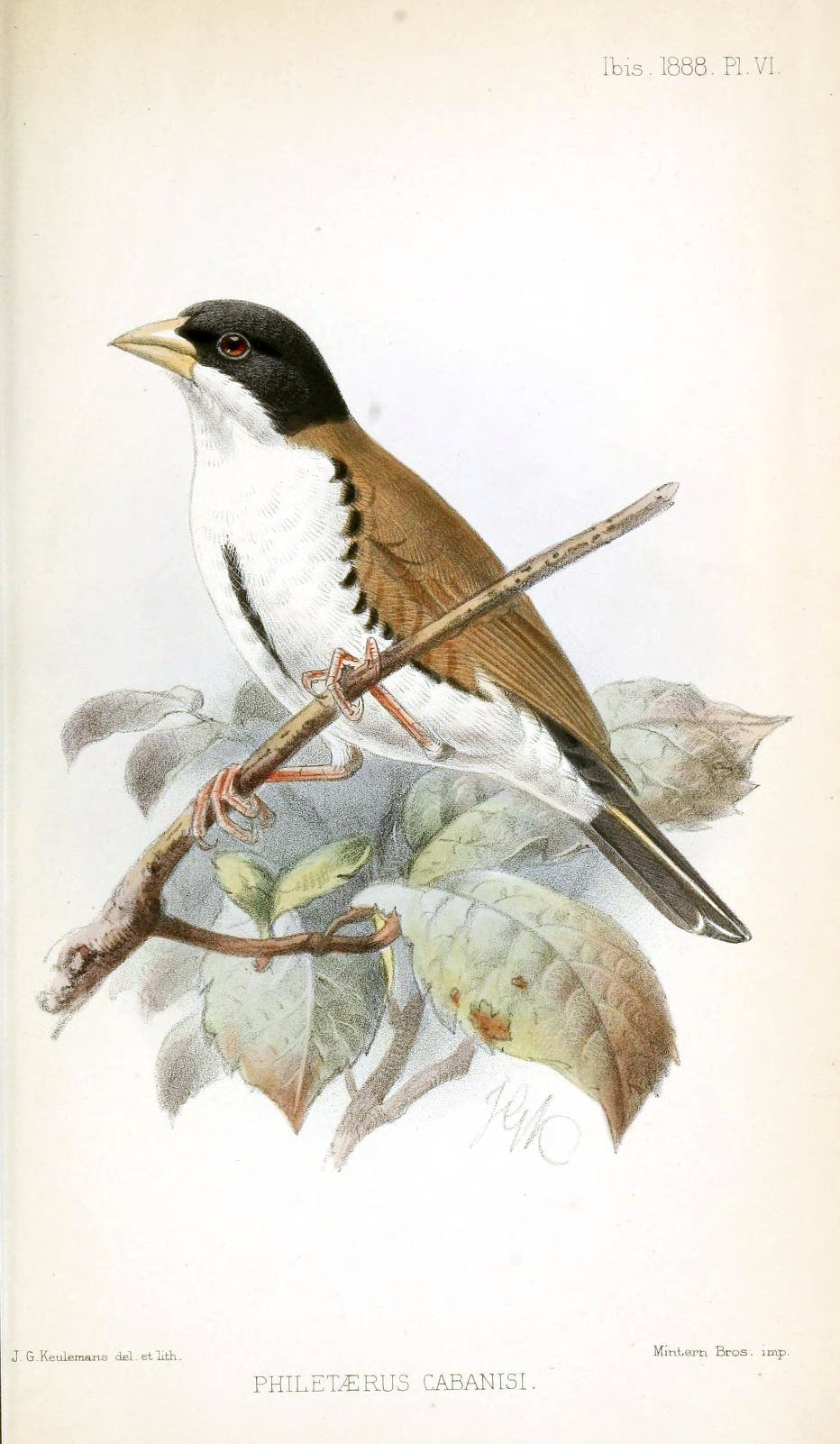
Illustration by J. G. Keulemans (1888)
