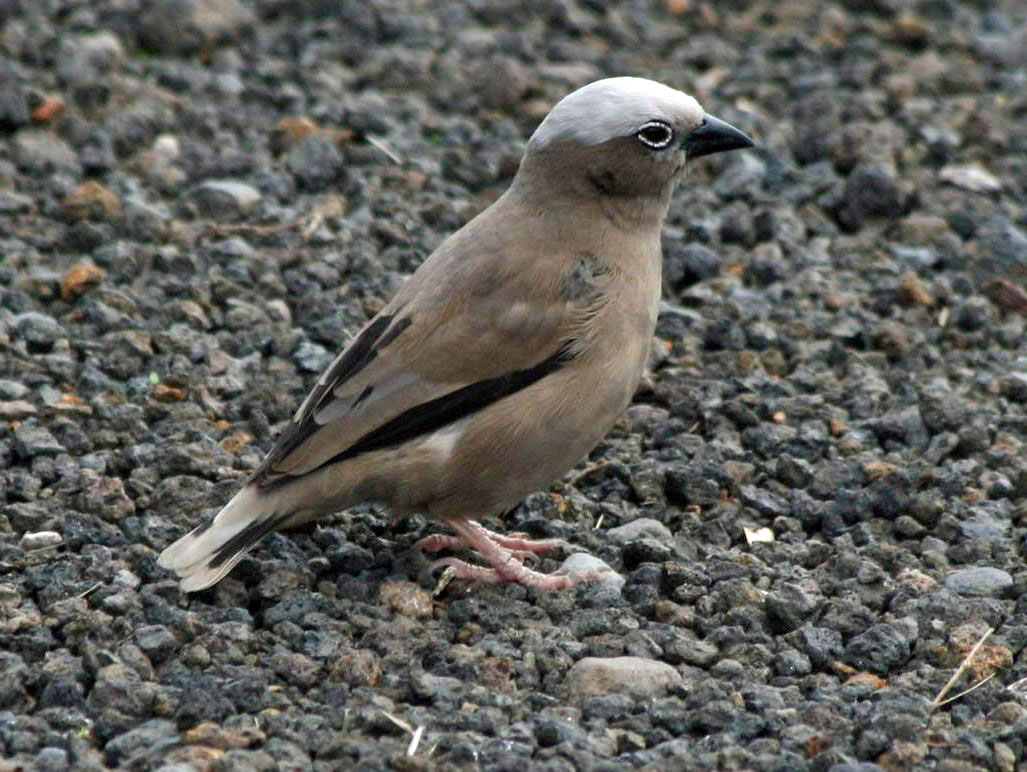
- ↑Pseudonigrita arnaudi, ↓P. cabanisi
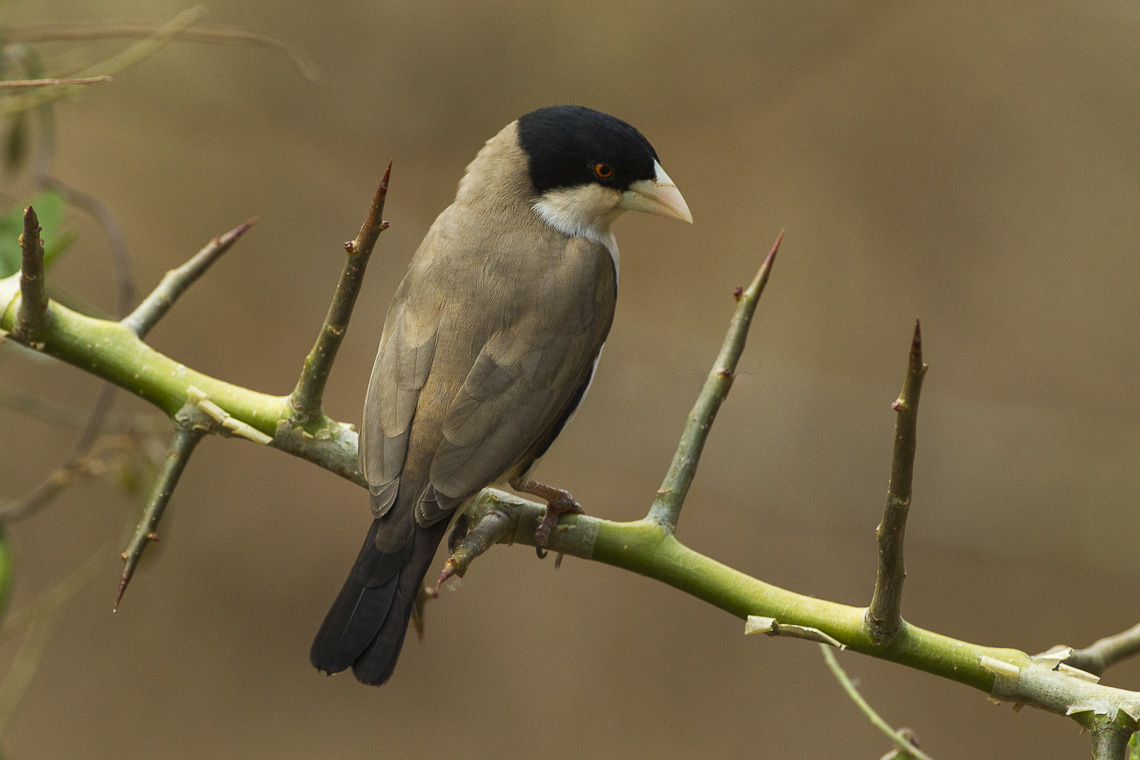

Scientific classification
- Kingdom: Animalia
- Phylum: Chordata
- Class: Aves
- Order: Passeriformes
- Family: Ploceidae
- Genus: Pseudonigrita; Reichenow, 1903

Type species
- Nigrita arnaudi Bonaparte, 1850

Synonyms
- Somalita

= Pseudonigrita =

Genus of birds

Pseudonigrita is a genus of sparrow-like birds in the weaverbird family.

== Extant Species ==
It contains two species, which are both found in eastern Africa:

Genus Pseudonigrita – Reichenow, 1903 – two species
Common name	Scientific name and subspecies	Range	Size and ecology	IUCN status and estimated population
Grey-capped social weaver	Pseudonigrita arnaudi (Bonaparte, 1850)	Ethiopia, Kenya, Somalia, South Sudan, Sudan, Tanzania, and Uganda	Size: Habitat: Diet:	LC
Black-capped social weaver	Pseudonigrita cabanisi (Fischer & Reichenow, 1884)	central and southern Ethiopia, much of Kenya, a patch of Somalia	Size: Habitat: Diet:	LC

== Taxonomy ==
French naturalist Charles Lucien Bonaparte described the grey-capped social weaver as Nigrita arnaudi in 1850, based on a specimen collected by the French explorer Joseph Pons d'Arnaud around 1841 near Juba on the White Nile. In 1884, the black-capped social weaver was first described by German East-Africa explorer Gustav Fischer and German ornithologist Anton Reichenow as Nigrita cabanisi, based on a specimen collected in 1883 by Fischer in the Pare Mountains. In 1903, Reichenow assigned both species to his newly erected genus Pseudonigrita, because he considered P. arnaudi and P. cabanisi related to weaverbirds (Ploceidae), while the other species Nigrita bicolor, N. canicapillus, N. fusconota and N. luteifrons are negrofinches assigned to the estrildid finches. In 1942, Hans von Boetticher was of the opinion that cabanisi was different enough to assign it to its own genus, and made the new combination Somalita cabanisi.

=== Etymology ===
Pseudonigrita: Greek: ψευδος pseudos "false"; genus Nigrita Strickland, 1843

=== Phylogeny ===
Based on recent DNA-analysis (which did not include P. cabanisi), the genus Pseudonigrita belongs to the group of sparrow weavers (subfamily Plocepasserinae), and is most related to Philetairus socius. This clade is sister to Plocepasser. Provided that the sister relationship between the Pseudonigrita-species is correct, the following tree expresses current insights.

- family Ploceidae
  - subfamily Amblyospizinae
    Amblyospiza albifrons
  - - - subfamily Plocepasserinae
        - Sporopipes
        - - Plocepasser
          - - Philetairus socius
            - genus Pseudonigrita
              - P. cabanisi
              - P. arnaudi
      - - subfamily Bubalornithinae
          - Dinemellia dinemelli
          - Bubalornis
        - subfamily Ploceinae
          all other weaverbirds
