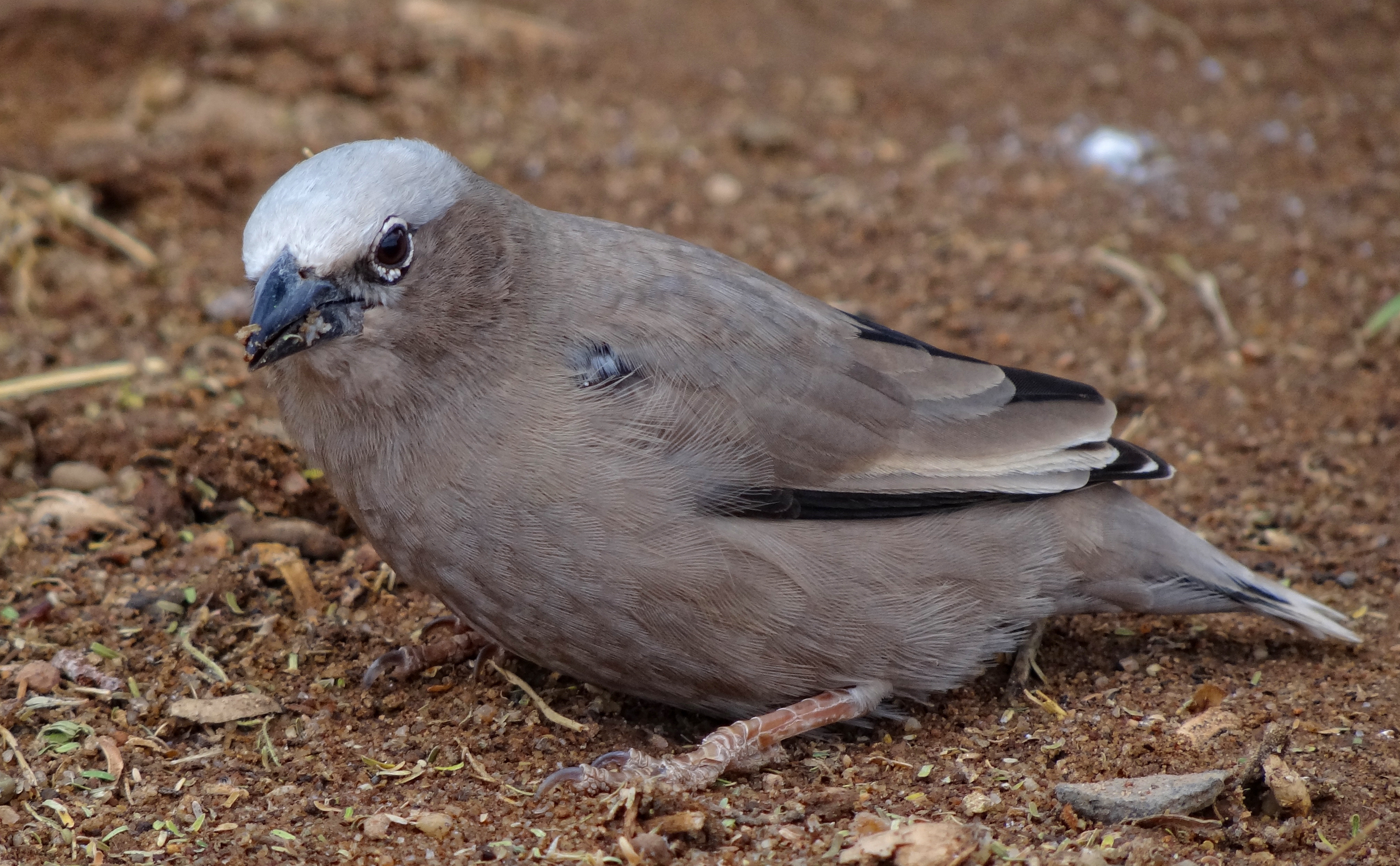
- In Amboseli, Kenya

Conservation status
- Least Concern (IUCN 3.1)

Scientific classification
- Kingdom: Animalia
- Phylum: Chordata
- Class: Aves
- Order: Passeriformes
- Family: Ploceidae
- Genus: Pseudonigrita
- Species: P. arnaudi

Binomial name
- Pseudonigrita arnaudi (Bonaparte, 1850)

Synonyms
- Nigrita arnaudi

= Grey-capped social weaver =

Species of bird

The grey-capped social weaver (Pseudonigrita arnaudi) is a sparrow-like liver-colored bird, with a pale grey crown, a dark grey bill, a whitish eye-ring, horn-colored legs, with some black in the wing and a light terminal band in the tail, that builds roofed nests made of straws, breeds in colonies in thorny Acacia trees, and feeds in groups gathering grass seeds and insects. Male and female have near identical plumage. DNA-analysis confirms it is part of the weaver family. It is found in Ethiopia, Kenya, Somalia, South Sudan, Sudan, Tanzania, and Uganda.

== Taxonomy ==
The French naturalist Charles Lucien Bonaparte described the grey-capped social weaver as Nigrita arnaudi in 1850. He chose the specific epithet to honor Joseph Pons d'Arnaud, the French explorer who had collected a specimen around 1841 near Juba on the White Nile, and sent it to the French Museum of Natural History. In 1903, the German zoologist Anton Reichenow assigned the species to his newly erected genus Pseudonigrita, because he considered P. arnaudi and P. cabanisi related to weaverbirds (Ploceidae), while the other species Nigrita bicolor, N. canicapillus, N. fusconota and N. luteifrons are negrofinches assigned to the estrildid finches.

Ludwig Reichenbach called it Arnauds nigrita in 1863. The "grey-capped social weaver" is the name used by the International Ornithological Committee (IOC). Other common names include grey-headed social weaver and Masai grey-headed social weaver.

=== Phylogeny ===
Based on a molecular phylogenetic study published in 2017 (which did not include P. cabanisi), the genus Pseudonigrita belongs to the group of sparrow weavers (subfamily Plocepasserinae), and is most closely related to Philetairus socius. This clade is sister to Plocepasser. Provided that the sister relationship between the Pseudonigrita-species is correct, the following tree expresses current insights.

- Ploceidae
  - Amblyospizinae
    Amblyospiza albifrons
  - - - Plocepasserinae
        - Sporopipes
        - - Plocepasser
          - - Philetairus socius
            - - Pseudonigrita cabanisi
              - Pseudonigrita arnaudi
      - - Bubalornithinae
          - Dinemellia dinemelli
          - Bubalornis
        - Ploceinae
          all other weaverbirds

== Subspecies and distribution ==
Three subspecies of the grey-capped social weaver are recognised. The southerly subspecies dorsalis can be distinguished by its bluish grey instead of livery brown back.

- P. arnaudi arnaudi can be found from eastern South-Sudan and neighboring northern Uganda, around Mount Elgon, the central highlands of Kenya southwards to a strip in Tanzania between Speke Gulf (a continuation of Lake Victoria at it southeastern corner) and Mount Kilimandjaro, and a few isolated populations in the very south-west corner of Sudan (South Darfur), around Mega in southernmost Ethiopia and around Xagar in southern Somalia.
- P. arnaudi dorsalis occurs in Tanzania, in a zone between the south shore of Lake Victoria to north of Lake Malawi, and an isolated population just south of Dar es Salaam.

== Description ==
The grey-capped social weaver is small for a weaver with 11–12 cm (4.3–4.7 in) long, and it weighs 15–26 g (0.53–0.92 oz). It is a sparrow-like liver-colored bird, with a pale grey crown, a dark grey bill, a whitish eye-ring, horn-colored legs, with some black in the wing and a light terminal band in the for a weaver relatively short tail. The tail band is visible during flight. The cap of the adult male is almost white, that of females more light grey. Adolescents have a duller plumage, a brown bill, and the cap is light liver-colored.

The birds make long series of seven to ten high-pitched piercing squeaks, sounding like tseeer-tseeer-tseeer-....

== Behaviour ==
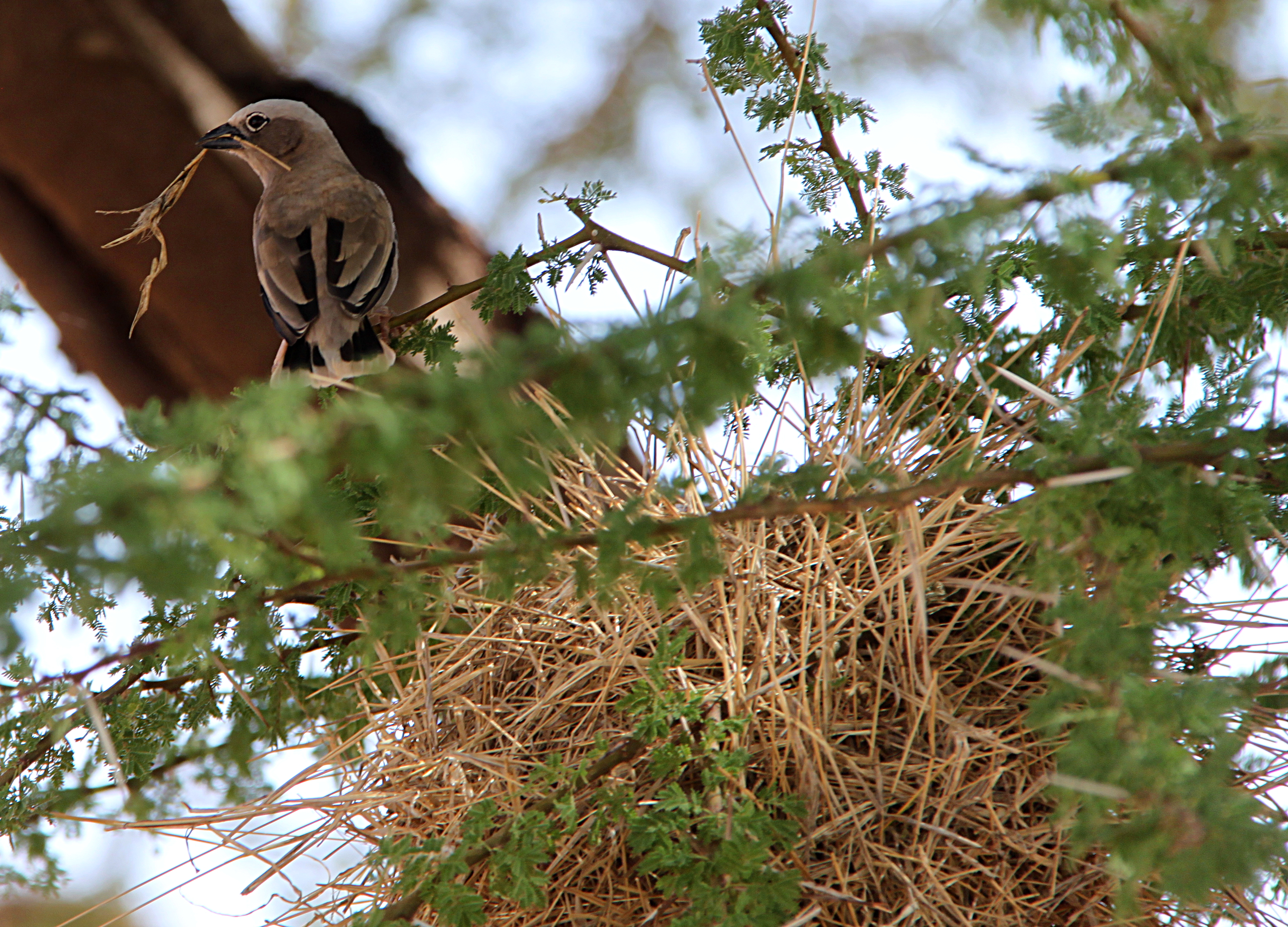
Arriving with building material

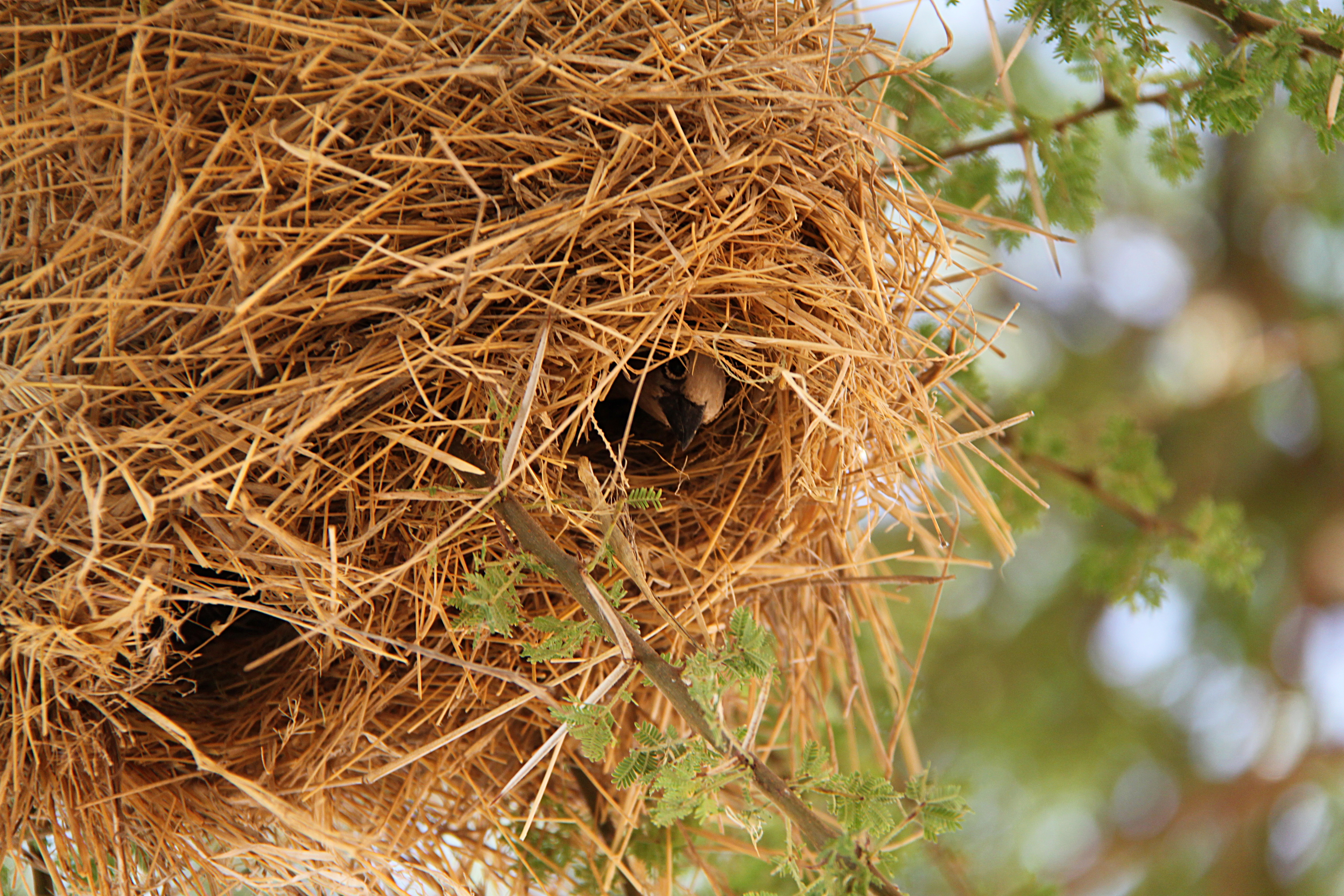
Nest with two entrances below

The grey-capped social weaver is monogamous and breeds in colonies. Its behavior closely resembles that of the sociable weaver Philetairus socius.

In studies conducted in Kenya, some individuals were observed to rest in their nests year round, even outside the breeding periods, with two to five together. The immediate surroundings of the nests were generally not defended against birds from other families that nested or slept in the same Acacia tree housing the colony. However, birds from other trees were usually attacked when landing in the colony tree. The order in which birds are allowed to feed was according to dominance, although members from other families from the same colony where better tolerated than birds from other colonies. Aggression was rare or absent between members of the same group.

=== Feeding ===
The grey-capped social weaver feeds on both grass seeds and insects, such as grasshoppers, beetles, termites and caterpillars. Feeding mostly takes place in groups at some distance from the colony.

=== Breeding ===
Grey-capped social weavers breed colonially. The nests are not only used for breeding but also for fully grown birds to sleep in at night. Breeding takes place throughout the year, but there is a peak that enables the birds to make use of periods that food is plenty, such as between August and December in South Sudan and between March and May in eastern Africa. Nests are built hanging from thin branches, often in Vachellia drepanolobium, and sometimes in other acacia species such as the umbrella thorn acacia (V. tortilis), blackthorn (Senegalia mellifera) or gum acacia (S. senegal). The roofed nests have thick walls and are constructed from grass straws, which, in the dry climate keep well for many months. Nest are often constructed with two or three side-to-side or under old nests. One of the two entrances is closed just before the eggs are laid and opened again around the moment of fledging. The clutch consists of four eggs. They are approximately 19 mm (0.75 in) in length and 14 mm (0.55 in) in diameter, greenish, bluish or white, unadorned or with fine black or olive colored specks, more dense at thick end, or so heavily blotched that the overall color seems olive-brown or ash-grey. Both parents incubate the eggs but the female spends about twice as much time incubating as the male. The eggs hatch after thirteen or fourteen days. The nestlings are initially fed on a diet consisting exclusively of insects, and grass seeds are only given during the last days. Fledging occurs after about twenty days. Adult and adolescent birds from previous broods often help in nest building and feeding the chicks.

Roofed nests, with two downward-facing nest entrances, colony nesting, and choosing a thorny nesting tree, are all considered adaptations that help limit predation. Aggregated nests, thick walls and communal sleeping are considered adaptations against the cold nights in the arid distribution area of P. arnaudi.

Chestnut sparrows (Passer eminibey) sometimes drive grey-capped social weavers from their nests to take them over. Cut-throat finches (Amadina fasciata) however only use deserted nests.

== Aviculture ==
The grey-capped social weaver is sometimes kept and bred in captivity by hobbyists. Due to its social structure, P. arnaudi only starts breeding when in larger established groups (at least about ten pairs). It needs large and high cages, and thin branches to attach the nest and much suitable nesting material (grass straws) needs to be available. A specialised website suggest a ground cover of sand beneath the nesting branches, and grass elsewhere, inter-planted with a few very resistant shrubs. Adults fare well on a diet of 95% seeds and 5% insects, but during the breeding season about 20% of the food should consist of living insects, such as mealworms and small crickets. Fine stone grit and calcium sources, such as shell grit and cuttlebone, need to be provided. Due to its large demand in nesting material, excessive theft may occur if other Plocepasserinae-species are kept in the same confinement. This website also suggests to compose a group at one instance and not to introduce other birds later, particularly during breeding.

== Gallery ==
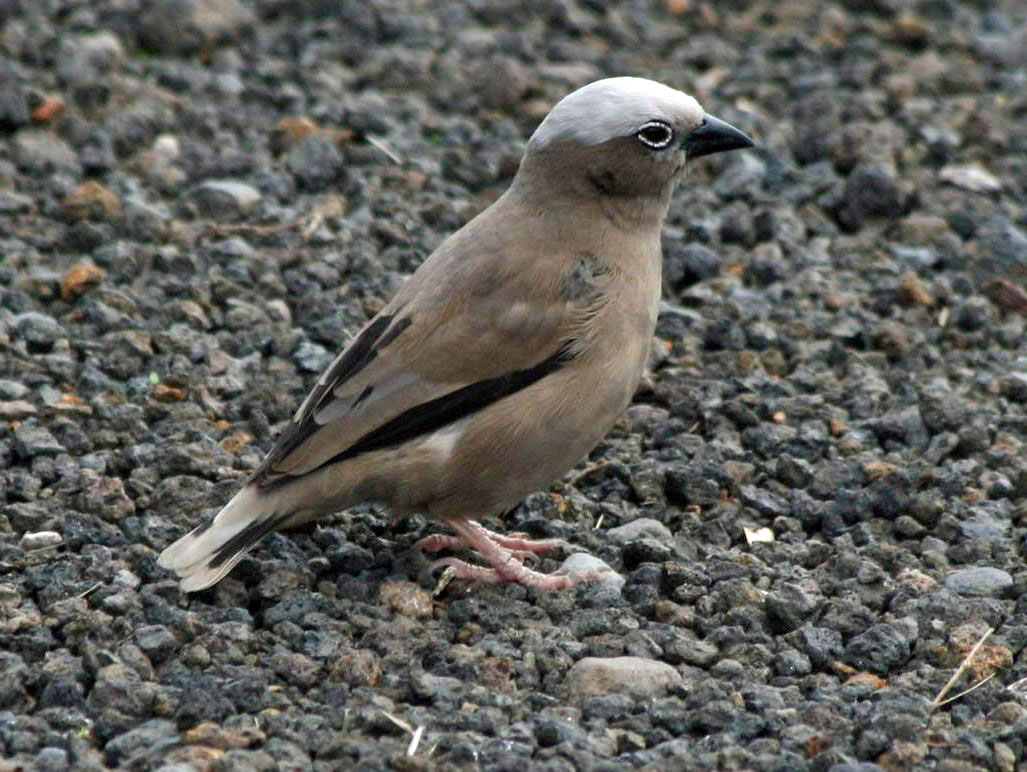
Subsp. arnaudi

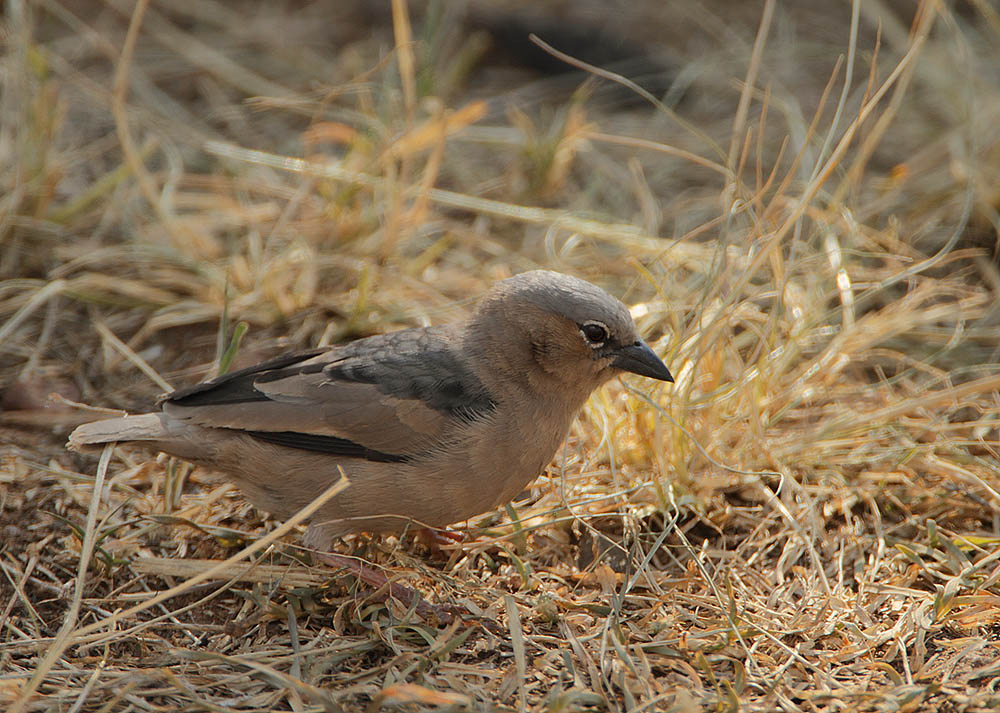
Subsp. dorsalis

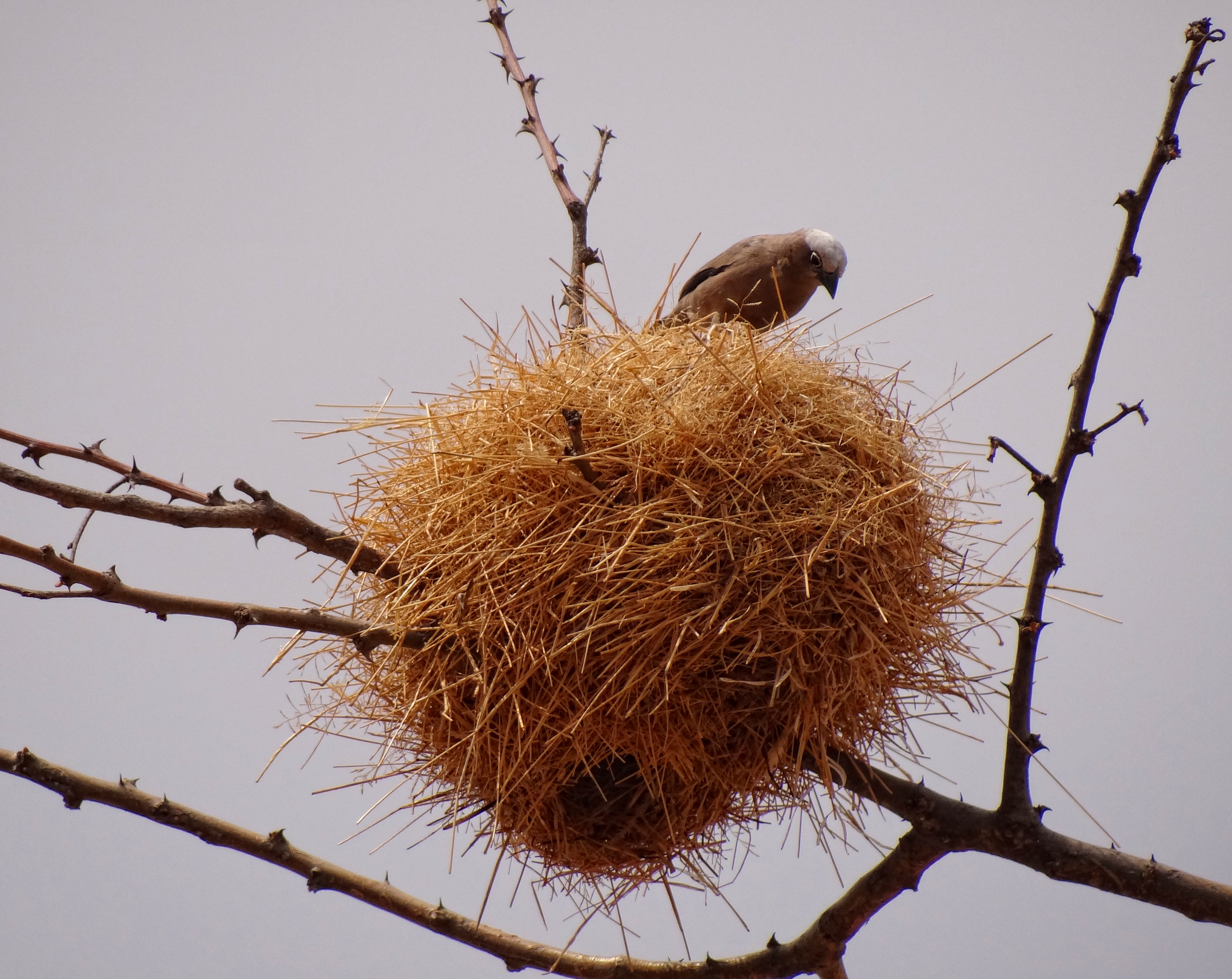
Nest
