= Social weaver =

Social weaver can refer to any of three African birds:

- Sociable Weaver (Philetairus socius)
- Grey-capped Social Weaver (Pseudonigrita arnaudi)
- Black-capped Social Weaver (Pseudonigrita cabanisi)
