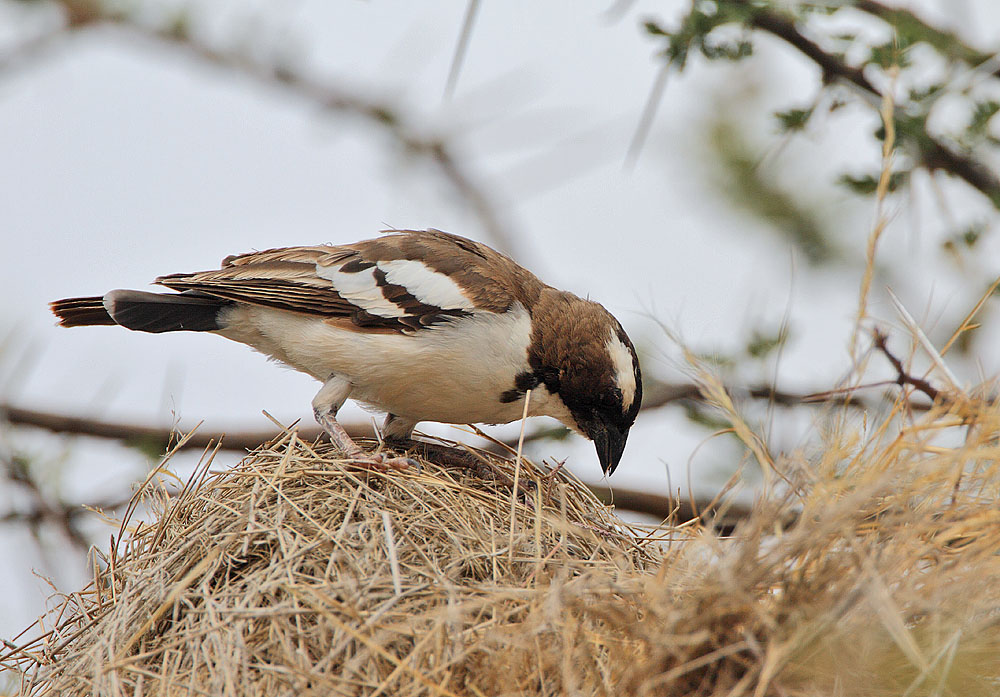
- White-browed sparrow-weaver, Plocepasser mahali

Scientific classification
- Kingdom: Animalia
- Phylum: Chordata
- Class: Aves
- Order: Passeriformes
- Family: Ploceidae
- Genus: Plocepasser; A. Smith, 1836

Type species
- Plocepasser mahali A. Smith, 1836

Synonyms
- Philagrus; Ploceopasser; Ploceuspasser

= Sparrow-weaver =

Genus of birds

The sparrow-weavers (Plocepasser) are a genus of birds in the family Ploceidae (weavers), but some taxonomic authorities place them in the family Passeridae (Old World sparrows).

== Taxonomy and systematics ==
The genus Plocepasser contains the following species:

Genus Plocepasser – A. Smith, 1836 – four species
Common name	Scientific name and subspecies	Range	Size and ecology	IUCN status and estimated population
White-browed sparrow-weaver	Plocepasser mahali Smith, 1836 Four subspecies: P. m. melanorhynchus; P. m. pectoralis; P. m. ansorgei; P. m. mahali	northern South Africa, its range includes Botswana, northern and central Namibia, and western Zimbabwe	Size: Habitat: Diet:	LC
Chestnut-crowned sparrow-weaver	Plocepasser superciliosus (Cretzschmar, 1827)	Benin, Burkina Faso, Cameroon, Central African Republic, Chad, Democratic Republic of the Congo, Ivory Coast, Eritrea, Ethiopia, Gambia, Ghana, Guinea, Guinea-Bissau, Kenya, Mali, Niger, Nigeria, Senegal, South Sudan, Sudan, Togo, and Uganda.	Size: Habitat: Diet:	LC
Donaldson Smith's sparrow-weaver	Plocepasser donaldsoni Sharpe, 1895	Ethiopia, Kenya, and Somalia.	Size: Habitat: Diet:	LC
Chestnut-backed sparrow-weaver	Plocepasser rufoscapulatus (Büttikofer, 1888)	Angola, Democratic Republic of the Congo, Malawi, and Zambia.	Size: Habitat: Diet:	LC

=== Phylogeny ===
Based on recent DNA-analysis (which only included P. mahali), the genus Plocepasser belongs to the group of sparrow weavers (subfamily Plocepasserinae), and is most related to the clade that consists of Philetairus socius and the genus Pseudonigrita. This clade is sister to the most basic genus of the subfamily, Sporopipes. Provided that genera are correct clades, the following tree expresses current insights.

- family Ploceidae
  - subfamily Amblyospizinae
    Amblyospiza albifrons
  - - - subfamily Plocepasserinae
        - Sporopipes
        - - Plocepasser
          - - Philetairus socius
            - Pseudonigrita
    - - subfamily Bubalornithinae
        - Dinemellia dinemelli
        - Bubalornis
      - subfamily Ploceinae
        all other weaverbirds
