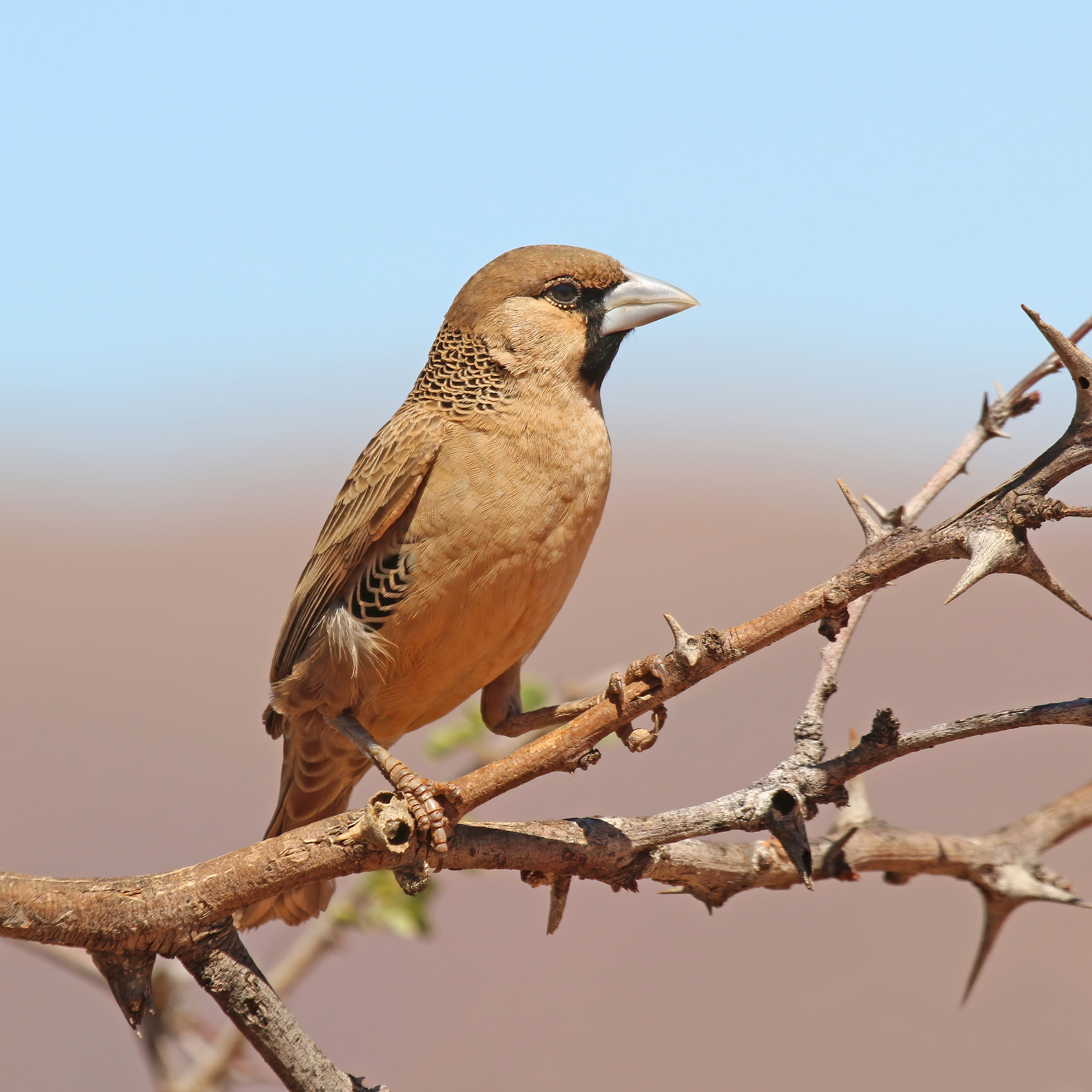
- At Tswalu Kalahari Reserve, South Africa

Conservation status
- Least Concern (IUCN 3.1)

Scientific classification
- Kingdom: Animalia
- Phylum: Chordata
- Class: Aves
- Order: Passeriformes
- Family: Ploceidae
- Genus: Philetairus; A. Smith, 1837
- Species: P. socius

Binomial name
- Philetairus socius (Latham, 1790)
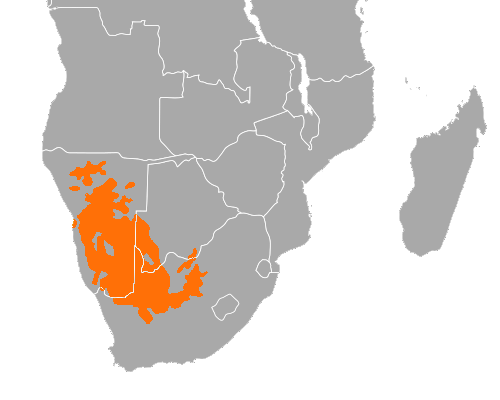
- range centred on the Kalahari, Namib and northern Karoo regions

= Sociable weaver =

Species of bird

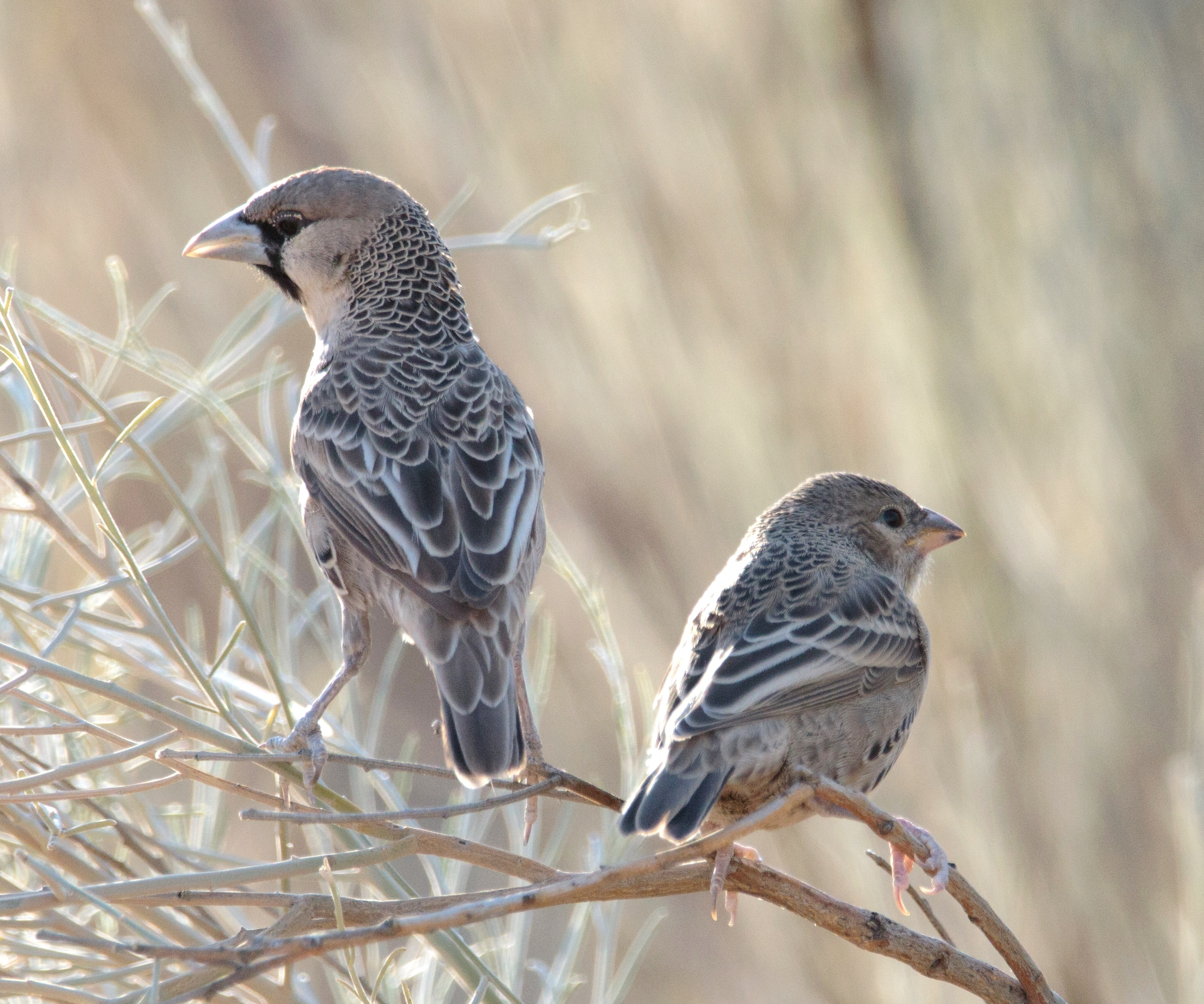
An adult and juvenile in the Kgalagadi Transfrontier Park

The sociable weaver (Philetairus socius) is a species of bird in the weaver family, endemic to Southern Africa. It is the only species in its genus Philetairus. It is found in South Africa, Namibia, and Botswana, but its range is centered within the Northern Cape Province of South Africa. The species builds large, compound, community nests, a rarity among birds. These nests are perhaps the most spectacular structure built by any bird.

== Taxonomy and systematics ==
The sociable weaver was first described by ornithologist John Latham in 1790. Alternative names include the common social weaver, common social-weaver, and social weaver. Formerly, four subspecies were recognised, but the species is now considered monotypic. The sociable weaver is the only extant species in the genus Philetairus.

=== Phylogeny ===
Based on a 2017 DNA-analysis, P. socius belongs to the group of sparrow weavers (subfamily Plocepasserinae) and is most related to the genus Pseudonigrita. These two genera are the sister group of the genus Plocepasser. The most basic genus of the subfamily is Sporopipes. Provided that genera are correct clades, the following tree expresses current insights.

- Ploceidae
  - Amblyospizinae
    Amblyospiza albifrons
  - - - Plocepasserinae
        - Sporopipes
        - - Plocepasser
          - - Philetairus socius
            - Pseudonigrita
    - - Bubalornithinae
        - Dinemellia dinemelli
        - Bubalornis
      - Ploceinae
        all other weaverbirds

== Description ==
Measuring around 14 cm (5 1/2 in) in length, the sociable weaver has a black chin, black, barred flanks, and a scalloped back. It typically weighs 26–32 g (15/16–1 1/8 oz), and sexes are indistinguishable. Tail Length around 42–48 mm (1.7–1.9 in).

== Distribution and habitat ==
The species ranges across northwestern South Africa and southwest Botswana, and extending northwards across Namibia. It is strongly associated with the arid savannas characteristic of the southern Kalahari region. The presence of stiff grasses such as Stipagrostis ciliata (syn. Aristida ciliata) – an important nesting material – is an important determinant of its distribution. The taller grasses and the fire-prone nature of the Northern and Central Kalahari regions may be a factor for the absence of the bird in those regions. The area is semiarid with low and unpredictable rainfall occurring mostly in the summer. The population has not been quantified, but the birds are described as "common to abundant".

== Behaviour and ecology ==
=== Breeding ===
In the southern range of the weaver's habitat, breeding may occur any time of the year and is closely linked to rainfall. In the northern range, a discrete breeding season between December and August has been noted. They may skip breeding during years when rainfall is low and a substantial number (sometimes over half) of birds in the colony may never breed in a given season. Under typical conditions, weavers raise up to four broods per breeding cycle. Sociable weavers are known to assist in the care of younger siblings and unrelated hatchlings, and nearly all pairs are assisted by helpers. A mating pair has been recorded as producing nine broods in a single season in response to repeated predation of its young. Unlike northern temperate passerine birds, which commence breeding within the first year of life, sociable weavers exhibit delayed-onset breeding, at sometimes up to two years of age.

=== Nesting ===
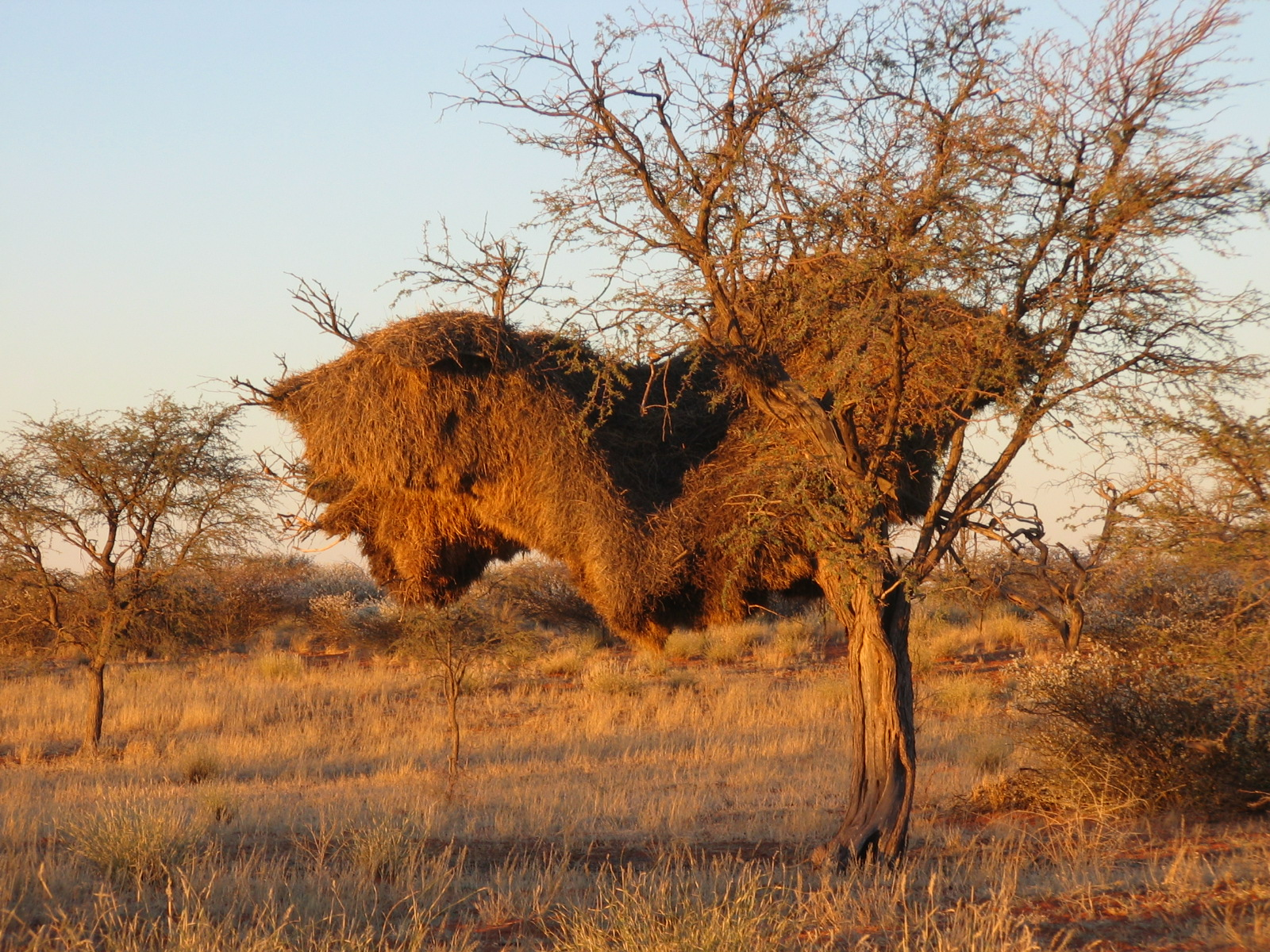
The nesting colonies of the sociable weaver are amongst the largest bird-created structures.

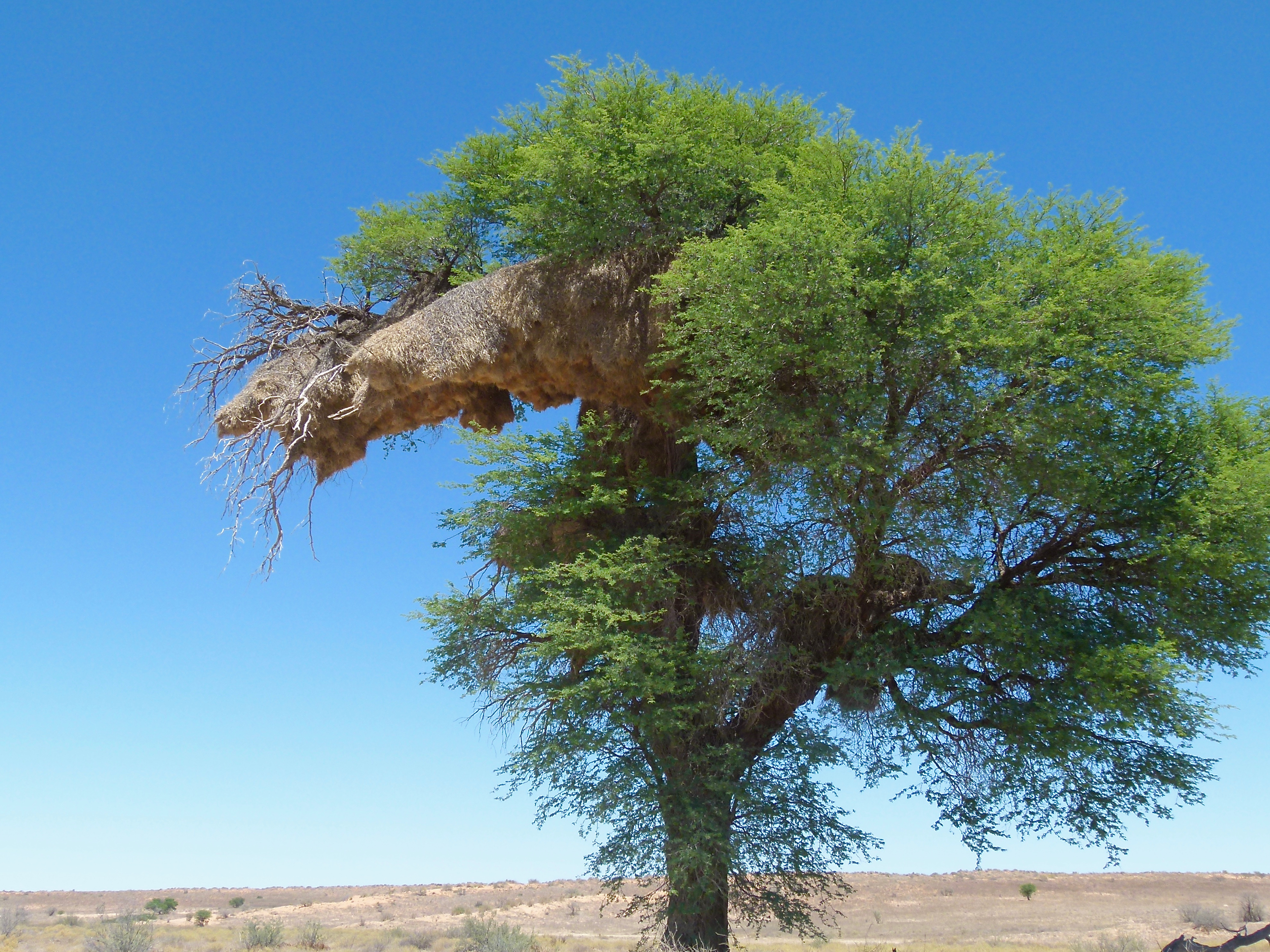
Camel thorn with Sociable weavers' nests.

Sociable weavers construct permanent nests on trees and other tall objects. These nests are amongst the largest built by any bird, and are large enough to house over 100 pairs of birds, containing several generations at a time. The nests are highly structured and provide birds with a more advantageous temperature relative to the outside. The central chambers retain heat and are used for nighttime roosting. The outer rooms are used for daytime shade, inside temperatures in occupied chambers have been found to vary over a range of only 7–8 °C (45–46 °F) while outside temperatures varied from 16–33.5 °C (60.8–92.3 °F).

The nests consist of separate chambers, each of which is occupied by a pair (sometimes with offspring) and used to roost and breed. Nests are built around large and sturdy structures such as acacia trees or sometimes even telephone poles. The trees generally used for nest-building are Acacia erioloba, Boscia albitrunca, and Aloidendron dichotomum. The birds at Etosha National Park also use Colophospermum mopane trees for nesting. Large nesting colonies can be active across many generations, sometimes over 199 years. The nest appears like a large haystack in the tree. If seen from below, entrances into the chambers may be seen, giving a honeycomb appearance. The entrances may be about 3 in (76 mm) wide and can be up to 10 in (250 mm) long. Sharp spikes of straw may be placed to deter predators from entering.

Sociable weaver nests form a habitat that is occupied by animals of many different taxa, including several other bird species, which use the nest in different ways, such as for breeding (as with the paradise finch and rosy-faced lovebird), roosting (as with the familiar chat and ashy tit), or as a platform for the nests of larger birds (such as owls, vultures, or falcons). Although most birds use sociable weaver nests commensally, cases of predation upon nestlings and animosity with the weavers has been reported of the pygmy falcon in some sites in Kimberley.

Reptile species also use the nests. Snakes, especially Cape cobras and boomslangs, are the most common nest predators, often consuming all the eggs in all the chambers of a large nest. Nest predation is often as high; in one study, 70% of the clutches laid were preyed upon. In addition, Trachylepis spilogaster (Kalahari Tree Skink) associate with the nests. Trees with nests appear to host more skinks than trees without nests. Additionally, these skinks have learned to eavesdrop on sociable weaver alarm calls to determine when a pygmy falcon, one of its main predators, is approaching.

Nests built in electricity poles sometimes cause short circuits in the rainy season and can catch fire in the dry season.

Some evidence indicates that cooperation in nest-building is driven by kin selection.

The bird droppings under the nesting colonies of the sociable weaver are used by scarab beetles.

=== Diet ===
The sociable weaver is insectivorous, with insects comprising 80% of their diet. As an adaptation to living in the dry Kalahari Desert, where standing water is scarce, the sociable weaver obtains all of its water from its diet. It also feeds on seeds and other plant products. Foraging is predominantly on the ground, but also on bark and leaves of trees.

== Status ==
Populations of the sociable weavers increased during the 2010s, perhaps due to increased availability of nesting structures such as electricity pylons and other man-made structures. Most of its present distribution is unlikely to see any major man-made alteration and its future in these areas is secure. A gap seen in its distribution in the Northern Cape Province, north of the Ghaap Plateau is probably due to habitat alteration by clearance of Acacia. In other areas, encroachment due to overgrazing may also cause local extinction.

== Gallery ==
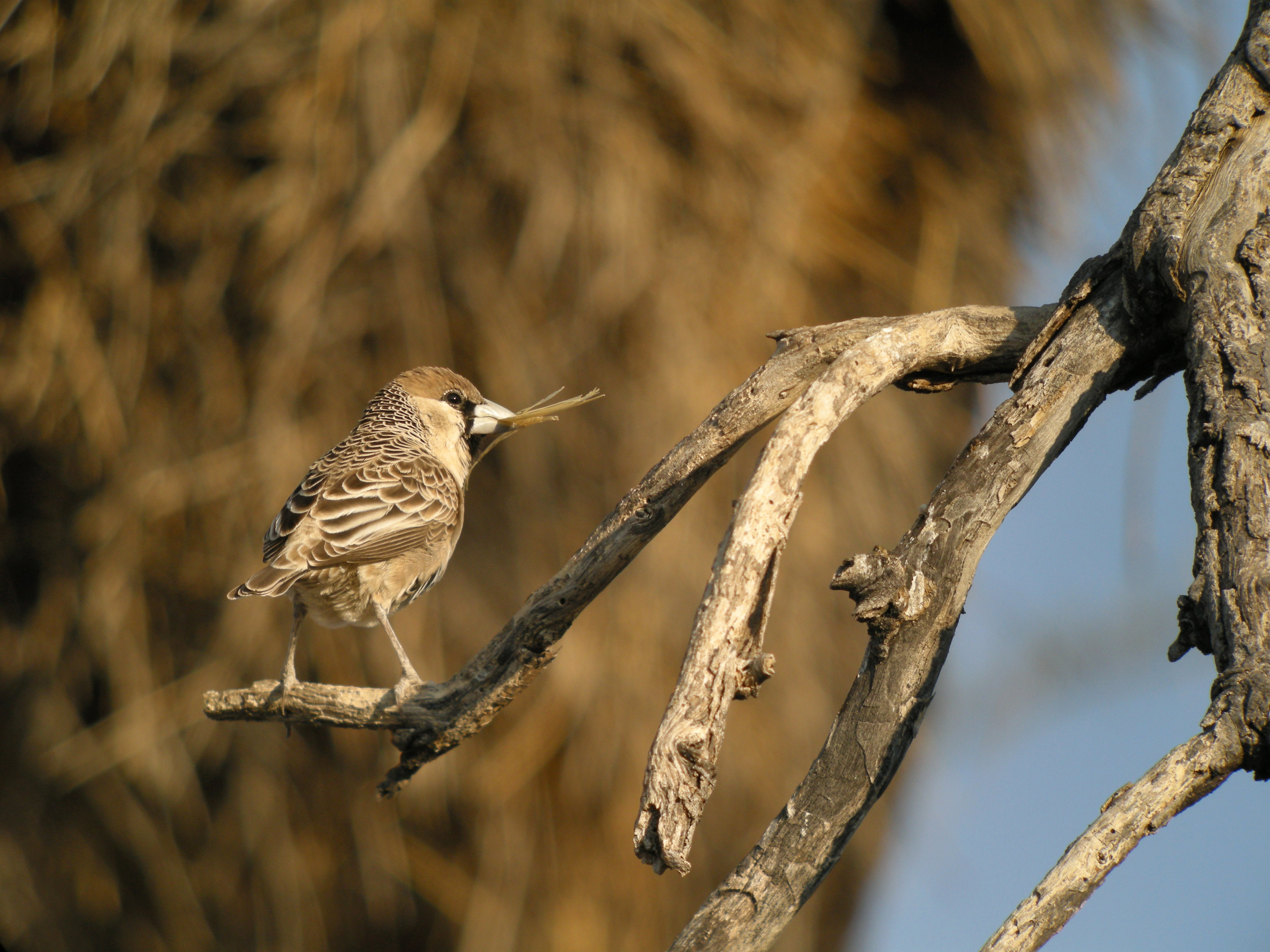
Adult arriving with nesting material

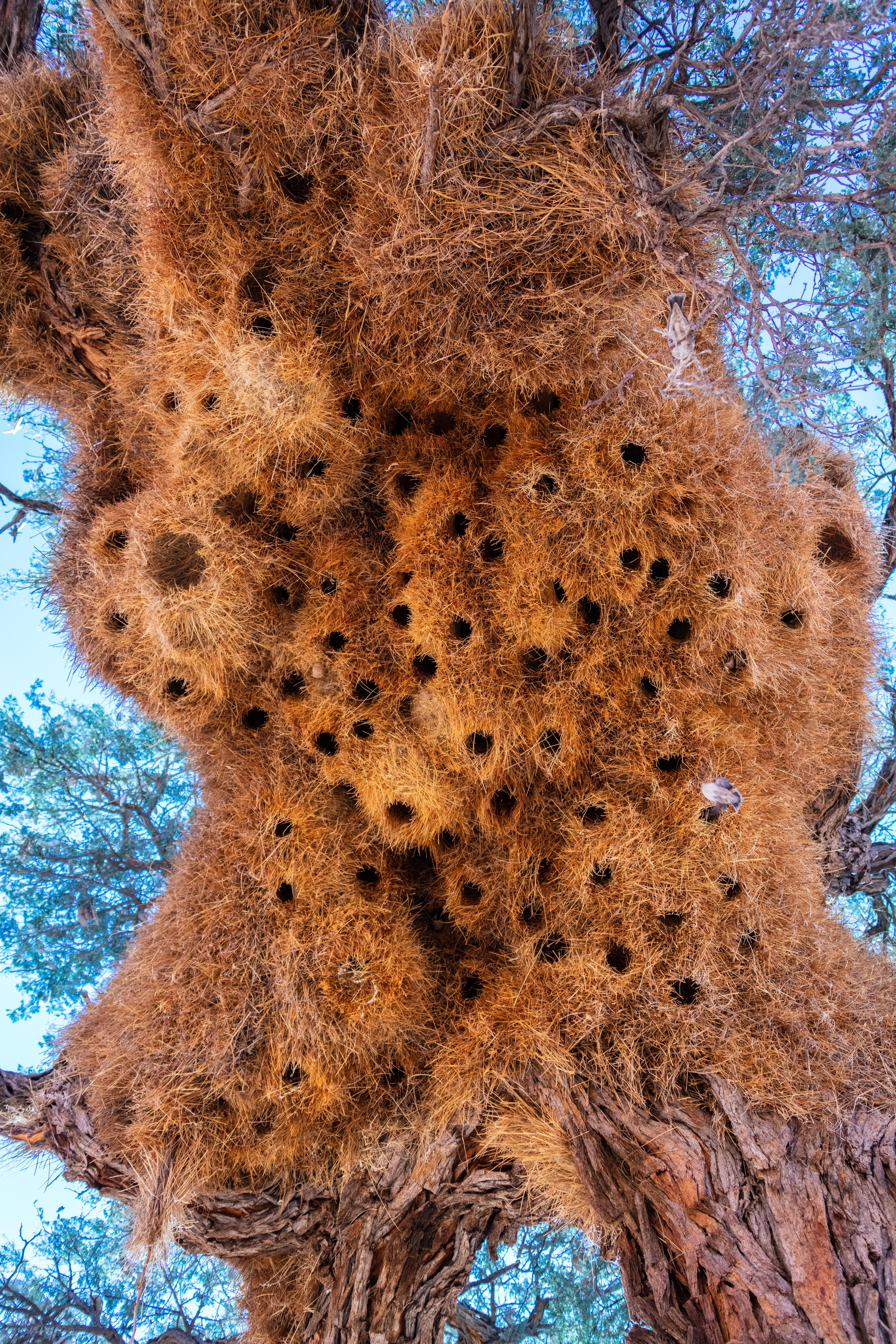
Chamber entrances seen from below

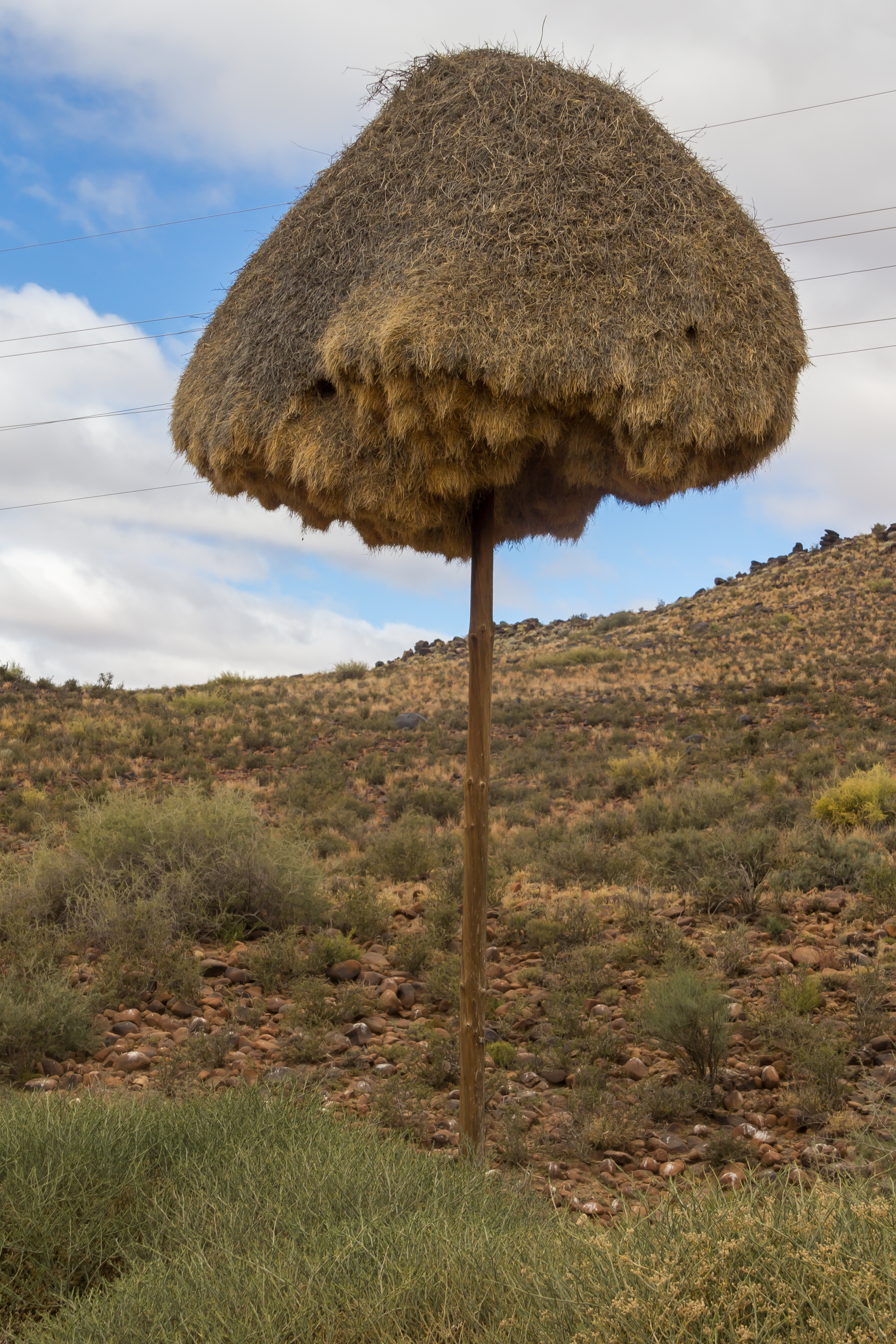
A nest on an electricity pole

In an acacia (with a baboon trapped by lions)
