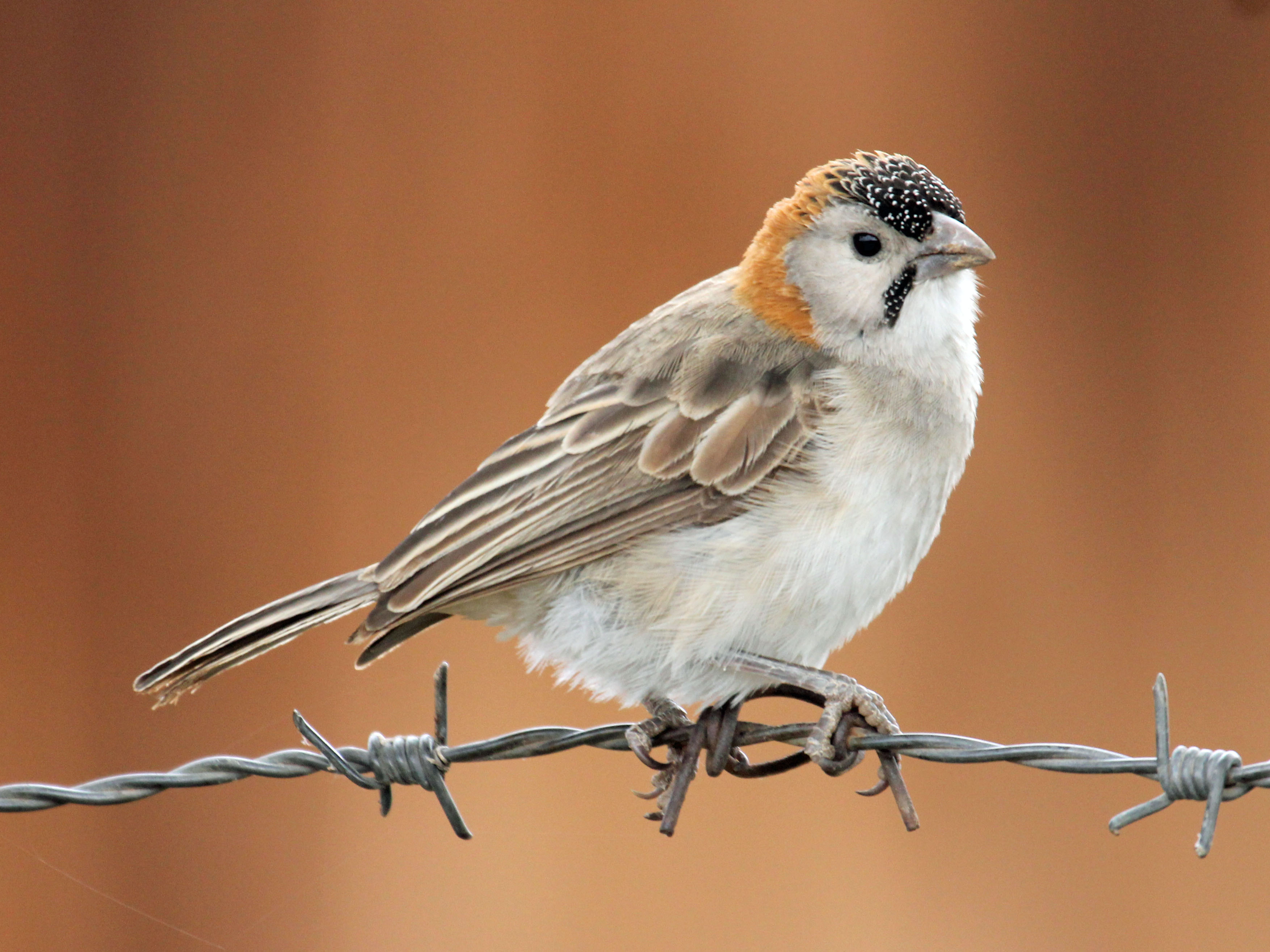

Conservation status
- Least Concern (IUCN 3.1)

Scientific classification
- Kingdom: Animalia
- Phylum: Chordata
- Class: Aves
- Order: Passeriformes
- Family: Ploceidae
- Genus: Sporopipes
- Species: S. frontalis

Binomial name
- Sporopipes frontalis (Daudin, 1800)

= Speckle-fronted weaver =

Species of bird

The speckle-fronted weaver (Sporopipes frontalis) is a species of bird in the family Ploceidae. It is found in Africa from Mauritania and Gambia in the west to Ethiopia and Tanzania in the east. Its natural habitat is dry savanna.

== Gallery ==
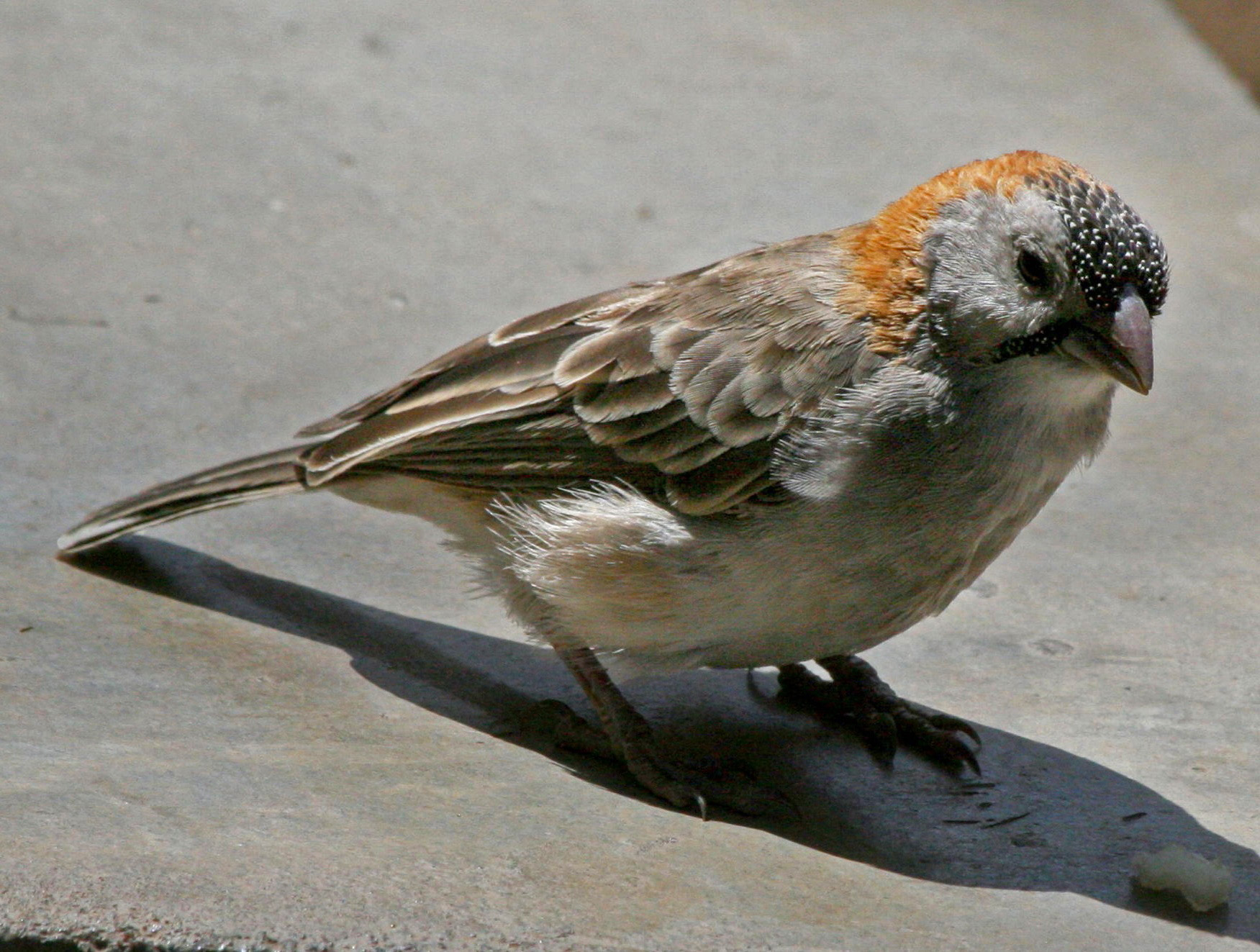
Speckle-fronted weaver

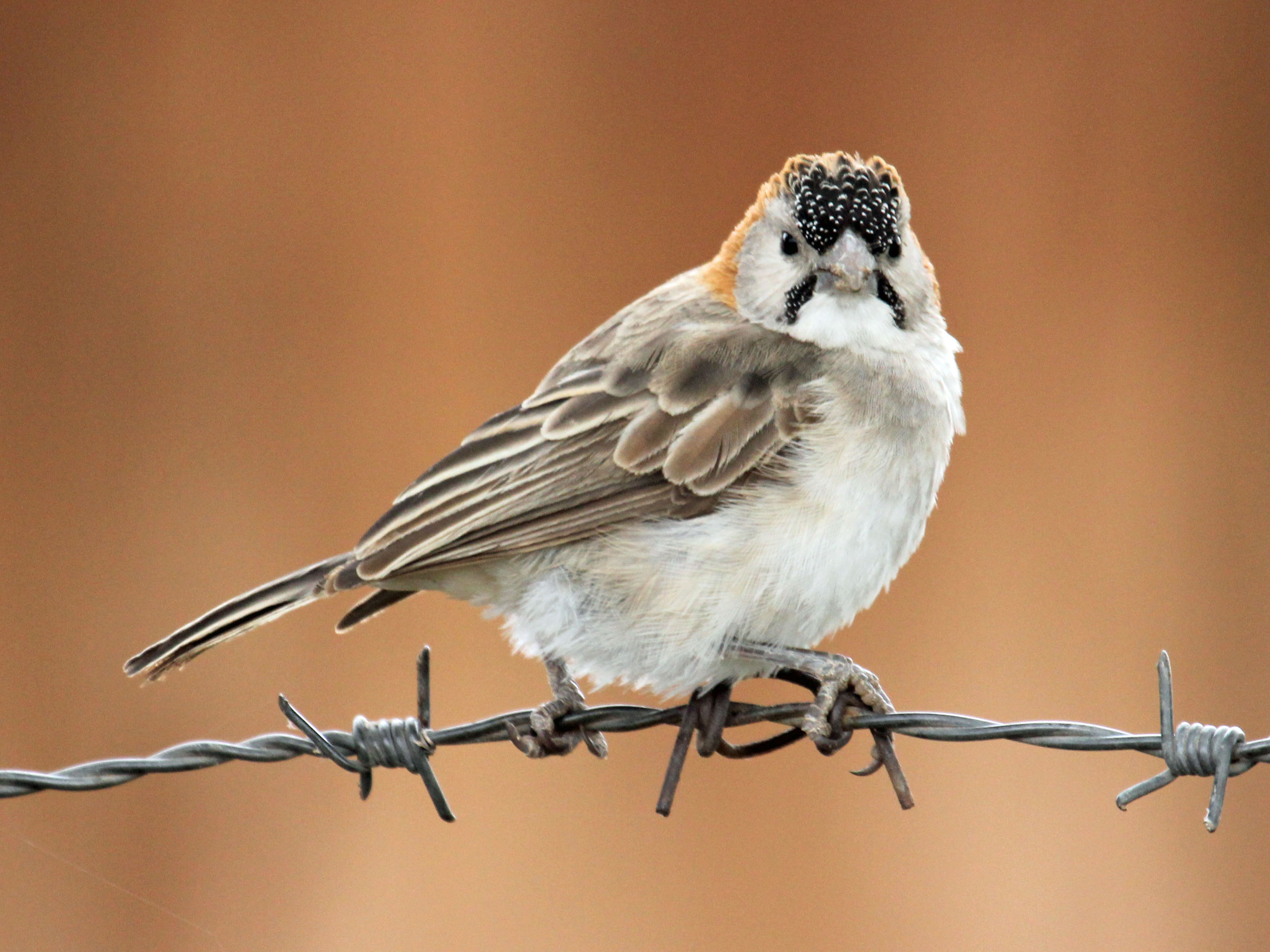

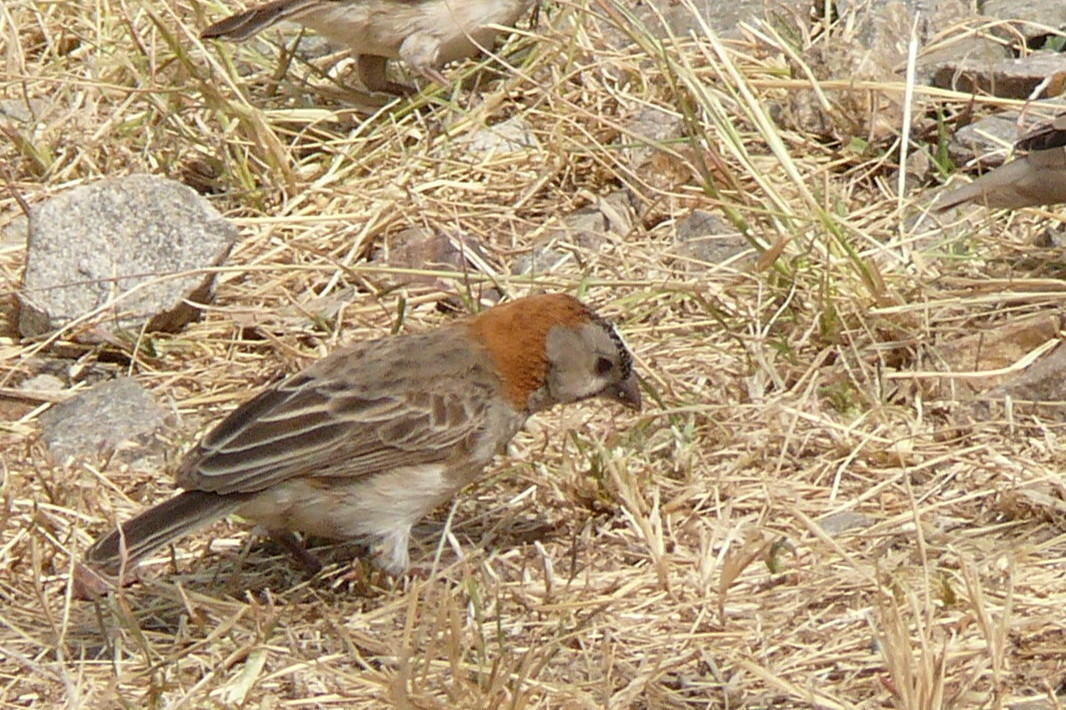

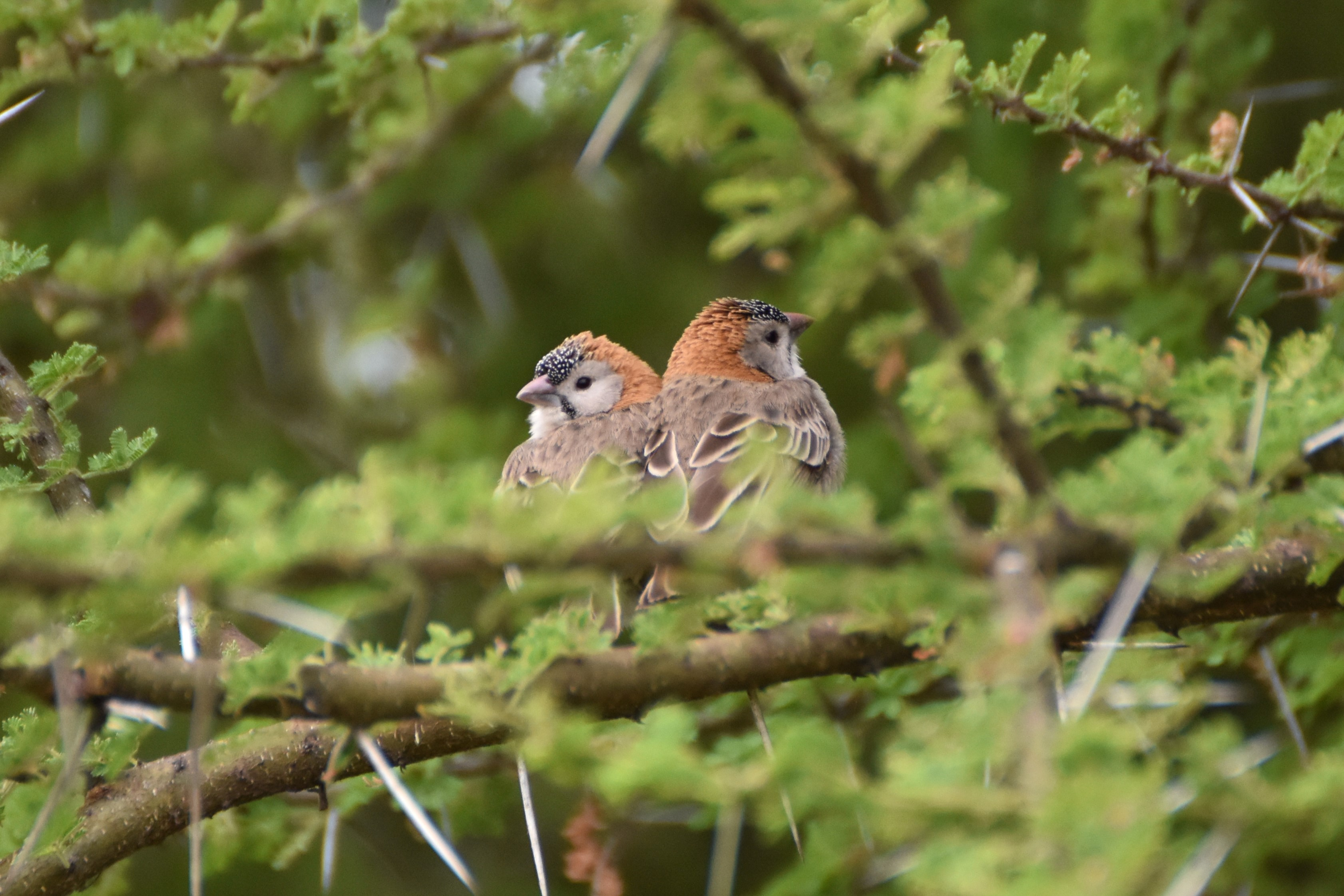
