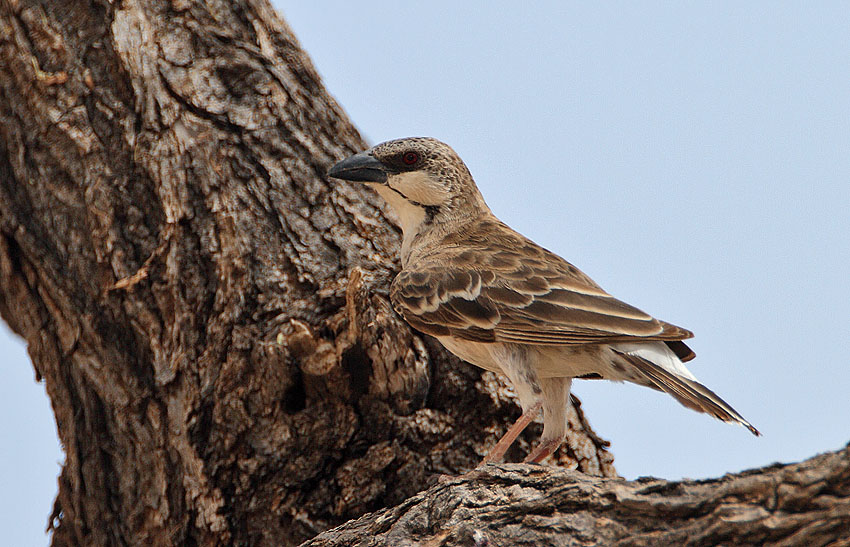
- In Samburu National Reserve, Kenya

Conservation status
- Least Concern (IUCN 3.1)

Scientific classification
- Kingdom: Animalia
- Phylum: Chordata
- Class: Aves
- Order: Passeriformes
- Family: Ploceidae
- Genus: Plocepasser
- Species: P. donaldsoni

Binomial name
- Plocepasser donaldsoni Sharpe, 1895

= Donaldson Smith's sparrow-weaver =

Species of bird

Donaldson Smith's sparrow-weaver (Plocepasser donaldsoni) is a species of bird in the family Ploceidae. It is found in Africa from southern Ethiopia to central Kenya and southern Somalia. It was named in honor of the 19th-century American explorer Arthur Donaldson Smith.
