= Scaly-feathered weaver =

Conservation status
- Least Concern (IUCN 3.1)

Scientific classification
- Kingdom: Animalia
- Phylum: Chordata
- Class: Aves
- Order: Passeriformes
- Family: Ploceidae
- Genus: Sporopipes
- Species: S. squamifrons

Binomial name
- Sporopipes squamifrons (Smith, 1836)

Species of bird

The scaly-feathered weaver (Sporopipes squamifrons), also known as the scaly-feathered finch, is a species of bird in the family Ploceidae. It is found in Angola, Botswana, Namibia, South Africa, Zambia, and Zimbabwe.

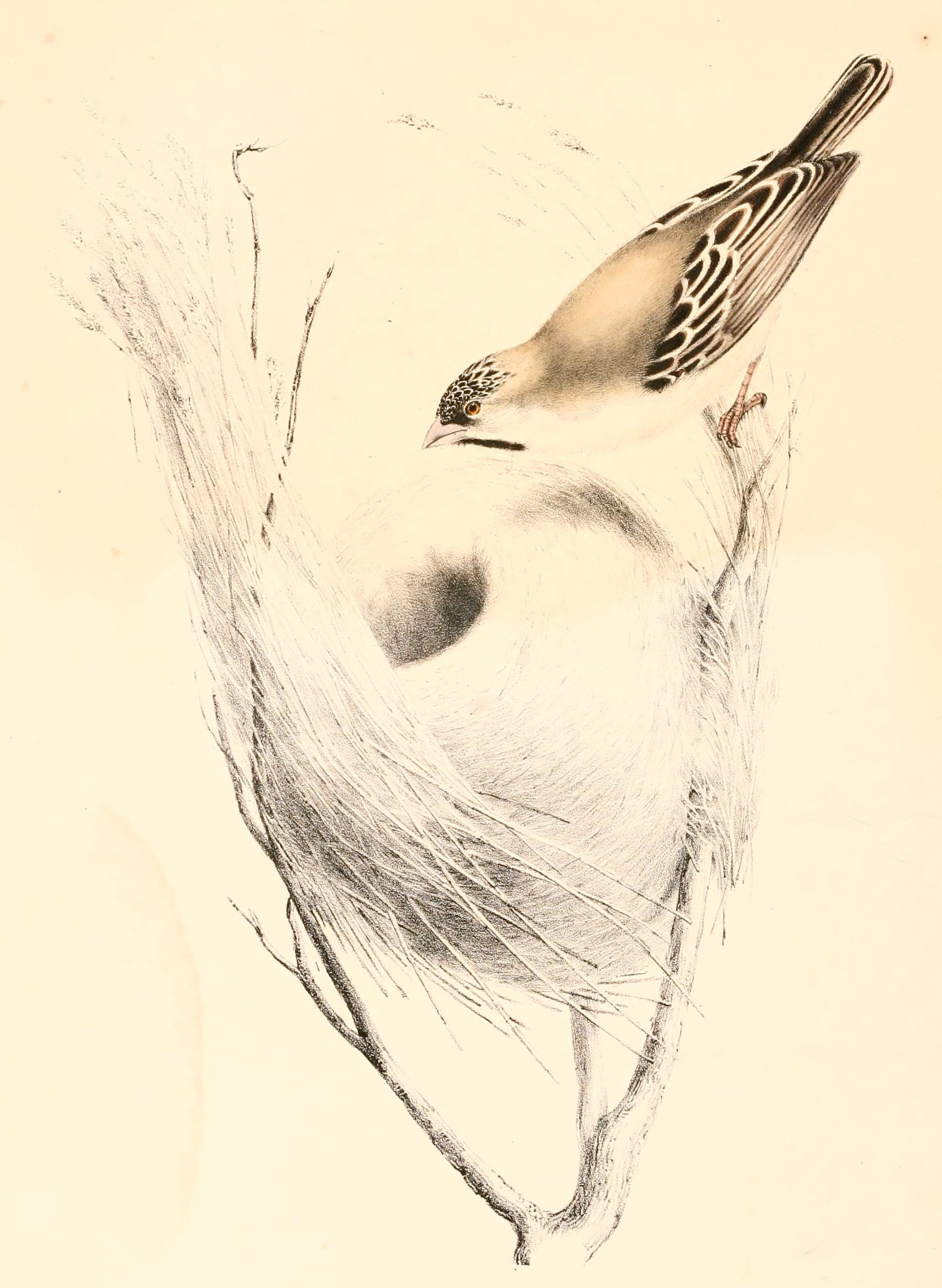
Adult at the spherical grass nest
