= Joseph Pons d'Arnaud =

French civil engineer and geographer

Théodore Louis Joseph-Pons d'Arnaud
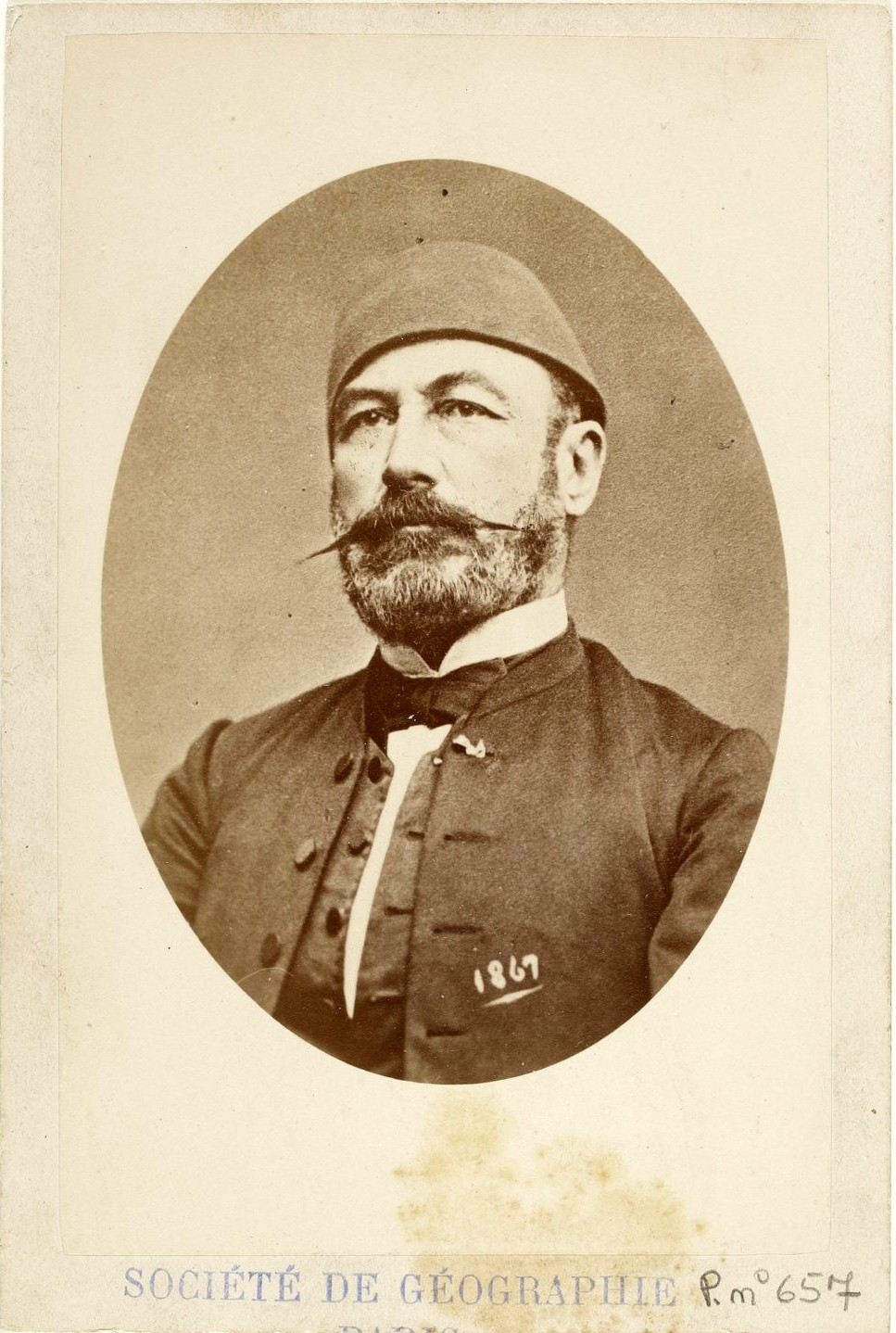
- Joseph-Pons-d'Arnaud
- Born: 29 May 1811; Sisteron
- Died: 8 June 1884 (aged 73); Chatou
- Occupation: Explorer, engineer

Théodore Louis Joseph-Pons d'Arnaud (1811-1884) was a French civil engineer, geographer and naturalist. In 1830 he was hired by the government of Egypt to work on irrigation projects. In 1840-41 he participated in an expedition raised by the Pasha of Egypt that searched (unsuccessfully) for the source of the White Nile. In 1841-42 he explored in the Sudan on an expedition led by Binbashi (Major) Selim Qapudan, an Egyptian officer in the Marine d'Alexandrie. Further voyages of exploration took him to Ethiopia and Yemen (1843) and the Sudan (1860).

In 1844 d'Arnaud was awarded the Grande Médaille d'Or des Explorations (gold medal for exploration) by French Geographical Society. In 1856 he was appointed as a Lieutenant colonel in an Egyptian regiment.

D'Arnaud authored a book on the aquatic plants of the Upper Nile. Two bird species are named in his honour: D'Arnaud's barbet, an East African insectivorous bird, and the Grey-capped social weaver, Pseudonigrita arnaudi.
