= White-headed buffalo weaver =

- D. d. boehmi Serengeti National Park, Tanzania

Conservation status
- Least Concern (IUCN 3.1)

Scientific classification
- Kingdom: Animalia
- Phylum: Chordata
- Class: Aves
- Order: Passeriformes
- Family: Ploceidae
- Genus: Dinemellia; Reichenbach, 1863
- Species: D. dinemelli

Binomial name
- Dinemellia dinemelli (Rüppell, 1845)

Species of bird

The white-headed buffalo weaver or white-faced buffalo-weaver (Dinemellia dinemelli) is a species of passerine bird in the family Ploceidae native to East Africa. The buffalo part of its name derives from its habit of following the African buffalo, feeding on disturbed insects. Two subspecies are recognized.

== Taxonomy ==
The white-headed buffalo weaver was first described by the German naturalist Eduard Rüppell in 1845.

=== Subspecies ===
Two subspecies of the white-headed buffalo weaver are now recognized.

Image	Subspecies	Distribution
	D. d. dinemelli (E. Rüppell, 1845)	northern part of its range: Sudan, Ethiopia, Somalia, Uganda, northern Kenya.
	D. d. boehmi (A. Reichenow, 1885)	southern part of its range: Kenya and Tanzania.

== Description ==
The white-headed buffalo weaver is 170 to 190 mm (6.7–7.5 in) in length and 57 to 85 g (2.0–3.0 oz) in weight. In addition to its white head and underparts, the white-headed buffalo weaver has a vividly orange-red rump and undertail coverts. Its thighs are dark brown. Narrow white bands can be found on the wings especially when stretch his wings sideways. Both sexes are similar in plumage and hard to differentiate. The bill is conical and black. D. d. dinemelli has a brown tail, whereas D. d. boehmi has a black tail.

== Distribution and habitat ==
The white-headed buffalo weaver is native to the African countries of Ethiopia, Kenya, Somalia, Sudan, Tanzania, and Uganda. It prefers habitats such as savanna, and shrublands, but especially dry brush and acacia thickets.

== Behaviour ==
Like most weavers, it is a gregarious bird which forages on the ground for insects, especially beetles and butterflies, fruits, and seeds, often in company with starlings. Foraging is often done in groups of 3–6 birds. It has various calls and the sound is sometimes parrot-like: "skwieeer", "kiiyerr", a ringing and repetitious "tew". In addition, variable sounds such as chuckles and whistles can be heard at breeding and roosting sites. The sounds are slow and drawn out. They also make trills: "tsu-weely-weely-wair". They often perch in trees and hang upside-down and can be very noisy. Breeding and roosting is done in groups and they can be defensive against intruders, usually by making noise. Altercations are rarely fatal and usually vocal. Males display to females by spreading their wings to show their white wing-patches and red-orange tail-coverts.

Breeding pairs are monogamous and nests are built together. The breeding season is related to rainfall and varies according to local conditions. Nest materials are pushed together, not interwoven, to form an oval 570 millimetres (22 in) wide. A short entrance tube opens downwards and is about 2 to 4 metres (6.6–13.1 ft) above the ground. Soft materials line the inner portions of the nest, which usually has several rooms, with defensive thorny branches on the outside. A large tree will have several of their nests, which other birds, such as the African pygmy-falcon, are known to use instead of building their own. The female incubates 3–5 greyish to pale blue eggs with red, brown and olive markings for 11–14 days. Both parents feed the chicks.
