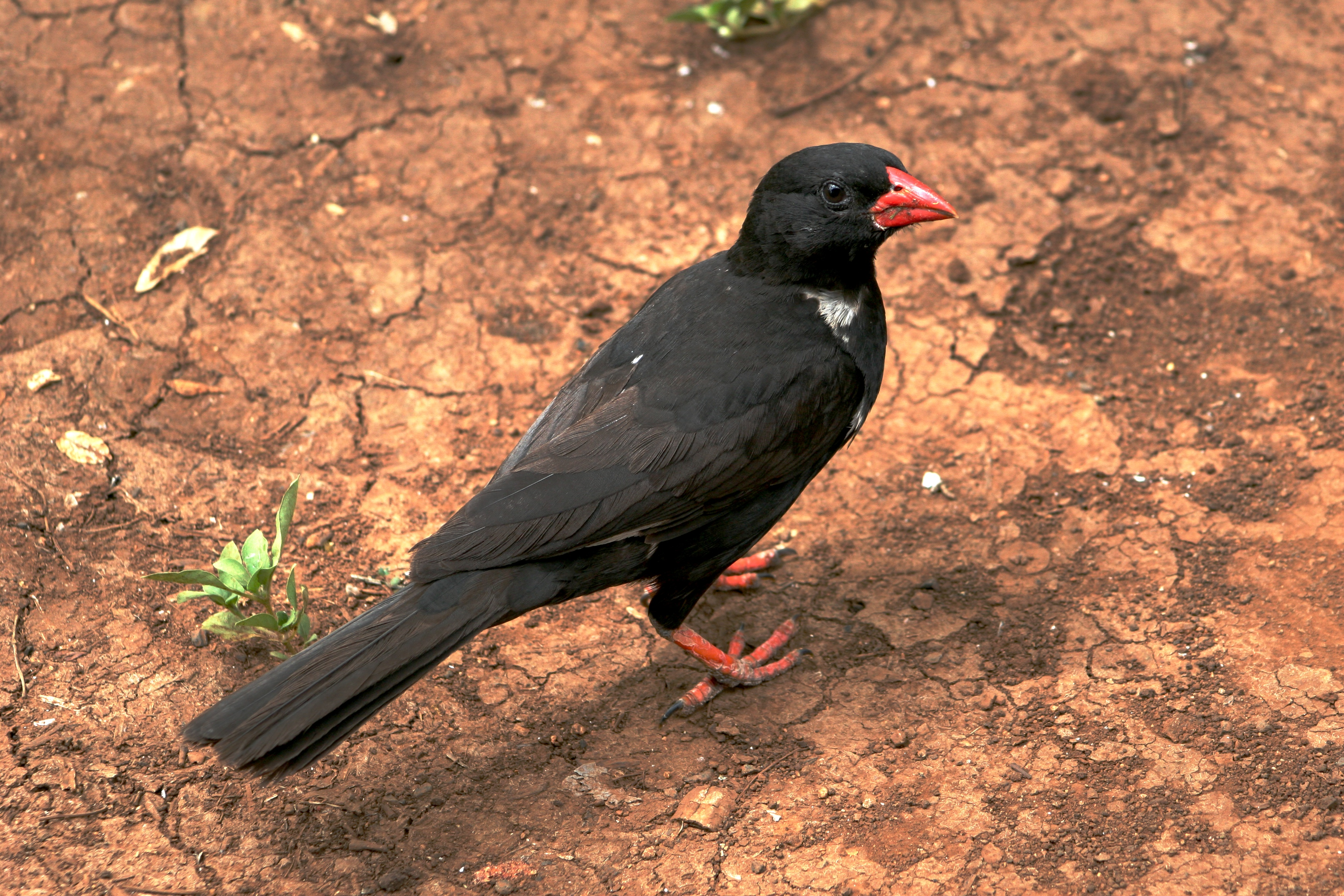
- Red-billed buffalo weaver (Bubalornis niger)

Scientific classification
- Kingdom: Animalia
- Phylum: Chordata
- Class: Aves
- Order: Passeriformes
- Family: Ploceidae
- Genus: Bubalornis; A. Smith, 1836

Type species
- Bubalornis niger A. Smith, 1836

= Bubalornis =

Genus of birds

Bubalornis is a genus of bird in the family Ploceidae. Established by Andrew Smith in 1836, it contains the following species:

Genus Bubalornis – A. Smith, 1836 – two species
Common name	Scientific name and subspecies	Range	Size and ecology	IUCN status and estimated population
White-billed buffalo weaver	Bubalornis albirostris (Vieillot, 1817)	Africa south of the Sahara Desert	Size: Habitat: Diet:	LC
Red-billed buffalo weaver	Bubalornis niger Smith, 1836	Angola, Botswana, Ethiopia, Kenya, Mozambique, Namibia, Rwanda, Somalia, South Africa, South Sudan, Swaziland, Tanzania, Uganda, Zambia, and Zimbabwe.	Size: Habitat: Diet:	LC

The name Bubalornis is a combination of the Greek words boubalos, meaning "buffalo" and ornis, meaning "bird". The genus got its name from the buffalo weavers' habit of following herds of African Buffalo.
