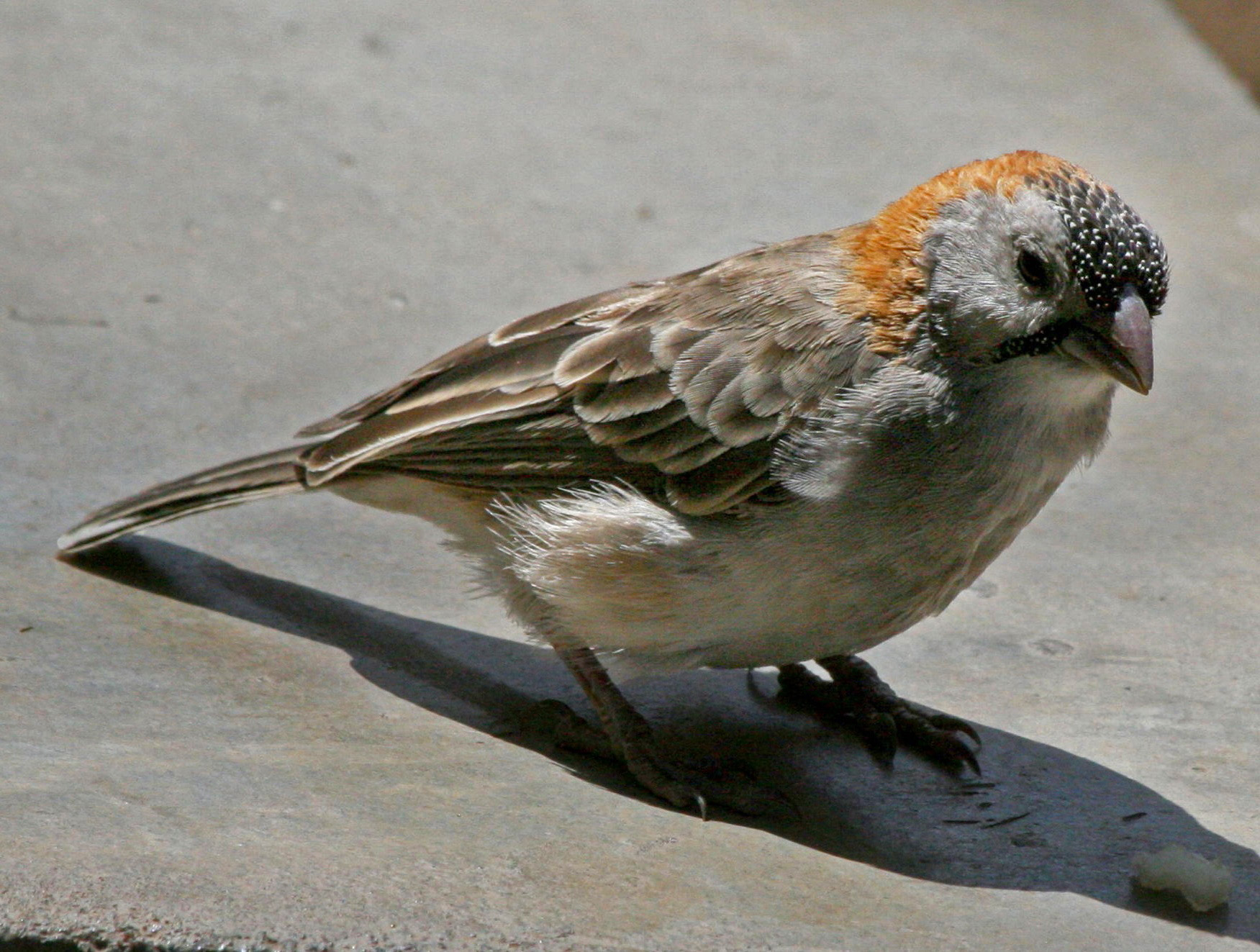
- Speckle-fronted weaver (Sporopipes frontalis)

Scientific classification
- Kingdom: Animalia
- Phylum: Chordata
- Class: Aves
- Order: Passeriformes
- Family: Ploceidae
- Genus: Sporopipes; Cabanis, 1847

Type species
- Fringilla lepidoptera M.H.C. Lichtenstein, 1842

= Sporopipes =

Genus of birds

Sporopipes is a genus of birds in the weaver family.

== Species ==
Genus Sporopipes – Cabanis, 1847 – two species
Common name	Scientific name and subspecies	Range	Size and ecology	IUCN status and estimated population
Scaly-feathered weaver	Sporopipes squamifrons (Smith, 1836)	Angola, Botswana, Namibia, South Africa, Zambia, and Zimbabwe.	Size: Habitat: Diet:	LC
Speckle-fronted weaver	Sporopipes frontalis (Daudin, 1800)	Benin, Burkina Faso, Cameroon, Central African Republic, Chad, Eritrea, Ethiopia, Gambia, Ghana, Guinea-Bissau, Kenya, Mali, Mauritania, Niger, Nigeria, Senegal, Somalia, Sudan, Tanzania, and Uganda.	Size: Habitat: Diet:	LC
