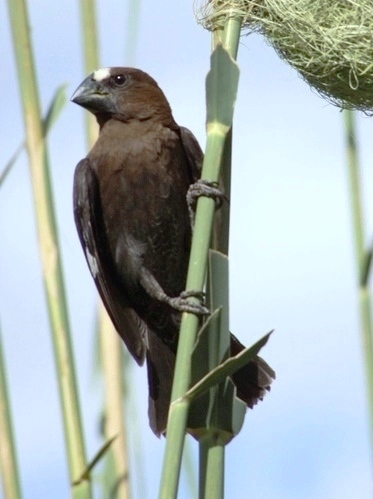
- Nominate male in Pretoria, South Africa
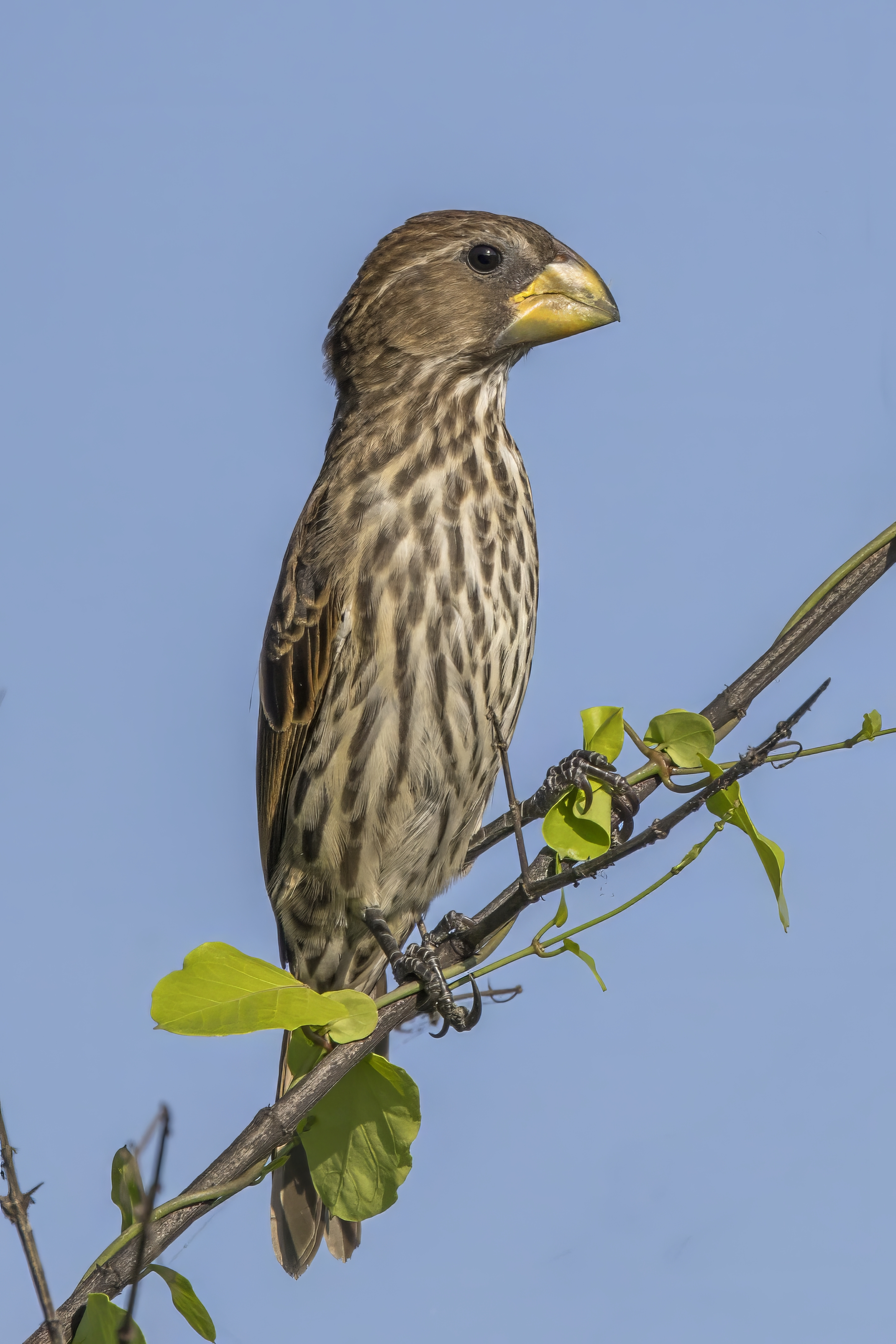
- Female A. a. woltersi in Mozambique

Conservation status
- Least Concern (IUCN 3.1)

Scientific classification
- Kingdom: Animalia
- Phylum: Chordata
- Class: Aves
- Order: Passeriformes
- Family: Ploceidae
- Genus: Amblyospiza; Sundevall, 1850
- Species: A. albifrons

Binomial name
- Amblyospiza albifrons (Vigors, 1831)

Synonyms
- Pyrrhula albifrons Vigors, 1831

= Thick-billed weaver =

Species of bird

The thick-billed weaver (Amblyospiza albifrons), or grosbeak weaver, is a distinctive and bold species of weaver bird that is native to the Afrotropics. It belongs to the monotypic genus Amblyospiza and subfamily Amblyospizinae.

They have particularly strong mandibles, which are employed to extricate the seeds in nutlets and drupes, and their songs are comparatively unmusical and harsh. Their colonial nests are readily distinguishable from those of other weavers, due to their form and placement, and the fine strands used in their construction.

They habitually fan and flick their tails.

== Taxonomy and systematics ==
The generic name Amblyospiza was coined by Carl Jakob Sundevall in 1850 and means "blunt, finch", referencing the very large bill, while the specific name albifrons refers white forehead of the males. The thick-billed weaver was formally described as Pyrrhula albifrons in 1831 by the Irish zoologist and politician Nicholas Aylward Vigors from the collection of Henry Ellis, the specimens of which were attributed to Algoa Bay and environs in the Eastern Cape.

=== Subspecies ===
Ten subspecies are currently recognized:

- A. a. capitalba (Bonaparte, 1850) – discontinuously from south-eastern Guinea to southern Central African Republic and north-western Angola
- A. a. saturata Sharpe, 1908 – southern Nigeria to north-western Democratic Republic of Congo
- A. a. melanota (Heuglin, 1863) – South Sudan and southern Ethiopia, through the rift valley and adjacent lowlands to north-western Tanzania
- A. a. montana van Someren, 1921 – Kenyan and Tanzanian interior, south-eastern Democratic Republic of the Congo to Malawi and Okavango Basin
- A. a. unicolor (G.A.Fischer & Reichenow, 1878) – East coast littoral from southern Somalia to Zanzibar and Pemba islands.
- A. a. tandae Bannerman, 1921 – north-western Angola and extreme western Democratic Republic of Congo
- A. a. kasaica Schouteden, 1953 – south-eastern Democratic Republic of Congo
- A. a. maxima Roberts, 1932 – south-eastern Angola, north-eastern Namibia, western Zambia, northern Botswana, extreme north-western Zimbabwe
- A. a. woltersi Clancey, 1956 – eastern Zimbabwe, southern Mozambique, north-eastern and eastern South Africa
- A. a. albifrons (Vigors, 1831) – eastern Zimbabwe and central Mozambique, southwards to eastern South Africa

== Distribution and habitat ==
It has a patchy distribution in West, East and southern Africa, where it is present in marshes, uplands, suburban areas and artificial wetlands.

Thick-billed weavers breed in reedy wetlands and can be found around forest edge outside the breeding season.

== Behaviour and ecology ==
=== Breeding ===
Thick-billed weavers are polygynous, in that a single male attempts to attract and mate with several females. A male may attract up to six females, and up to three nests may be active in any male's territory at once. When found at low density there are many apparently monogamous pairs, but they normally nest in small colonies. More than 100 nests have been counted in one South African colony. After mating the female normally will lay a clutch of 3 whitish pink eggs, spotted with red, purple and brown. The incubation of the eggs is carried out solely by the female. This lasts 14 to 16 days and the chicks are fed by regurgitation by the female until they fledge, though occasionally the male may also feed the young. The chicks fledge after about 18 to 20 days in the nest. The nests are vulnerable to predation and recorded nest predators include the white-browed coucal, house crow and the Nile monitor. After the nests have been used by the weavers they may be commandeered by climbing mice, or used for breeding by the orange-breasted waxbill or brown firefinch.

=== Nests ===
The thick-billed weaver constructs a distinctive nest which is compact, woven with thin strips of reeds and hung between the upright stems of reeds. It is globe-shaped with the entrance (unlike other weaver nests) near the top and facing to the side. The male weaves the nest with fine material leaving a neat impression, but the weave is in fact not as complex or developed as that of other weaver species. The initial entrance is large, but when a female has chosen the nest the entrance reduced to a narrow opening. Thick-billed weaver colonies may involve a single male, or may contain several males, and is usually established in a reed swamp.

== Gallery ==
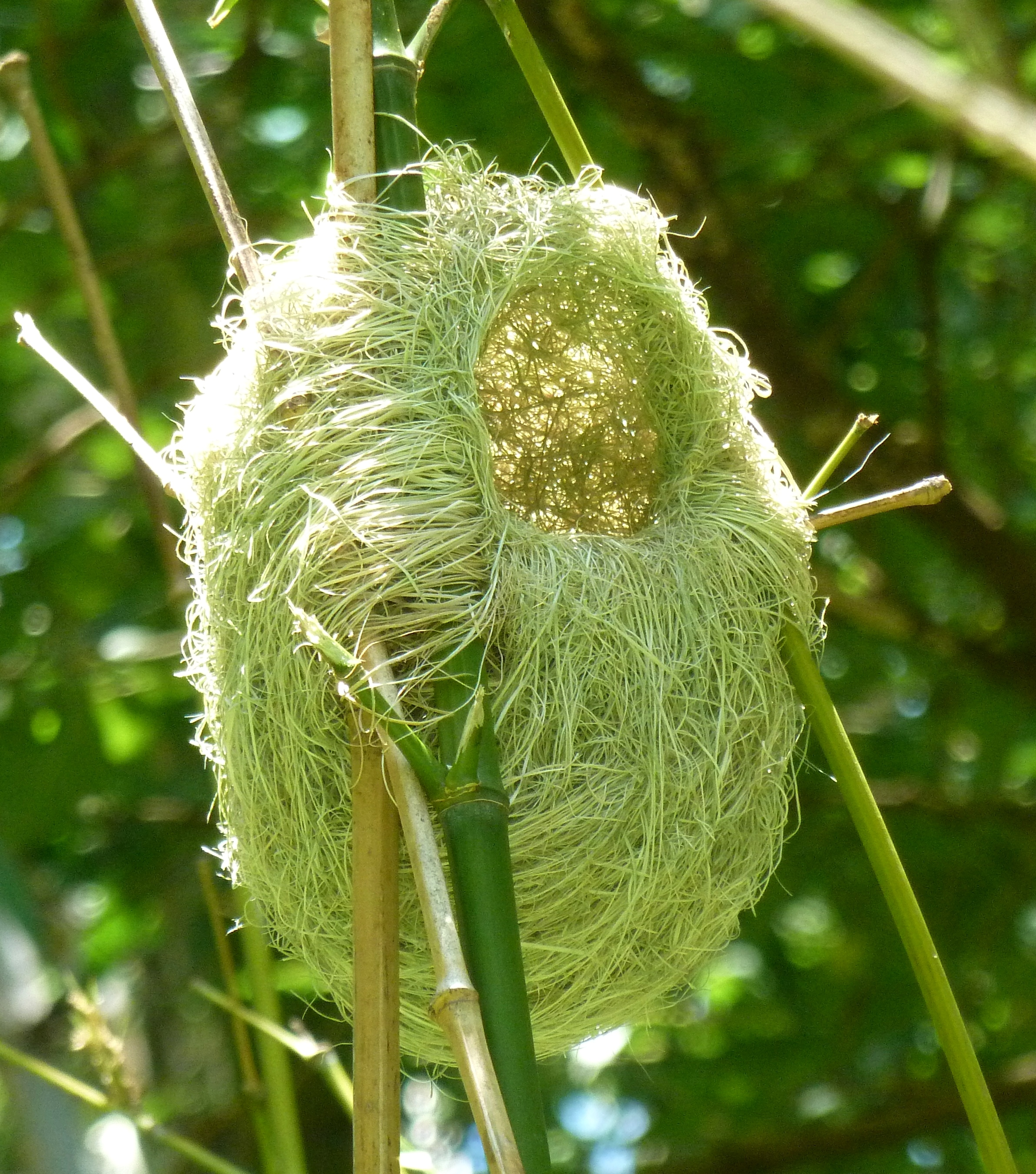
Nest built in an introduced bamboo species

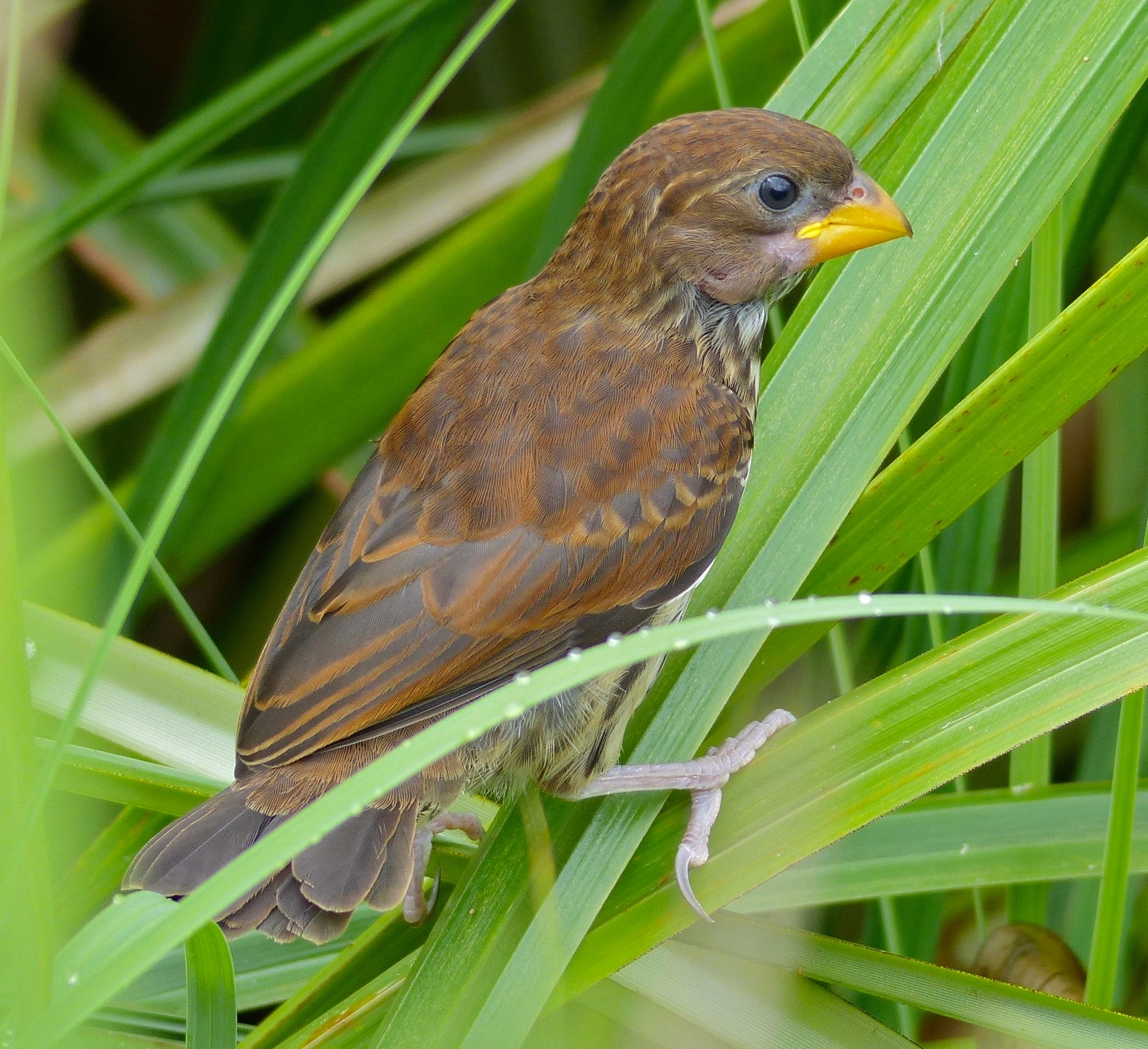
Immature bird showing yellow mandibles

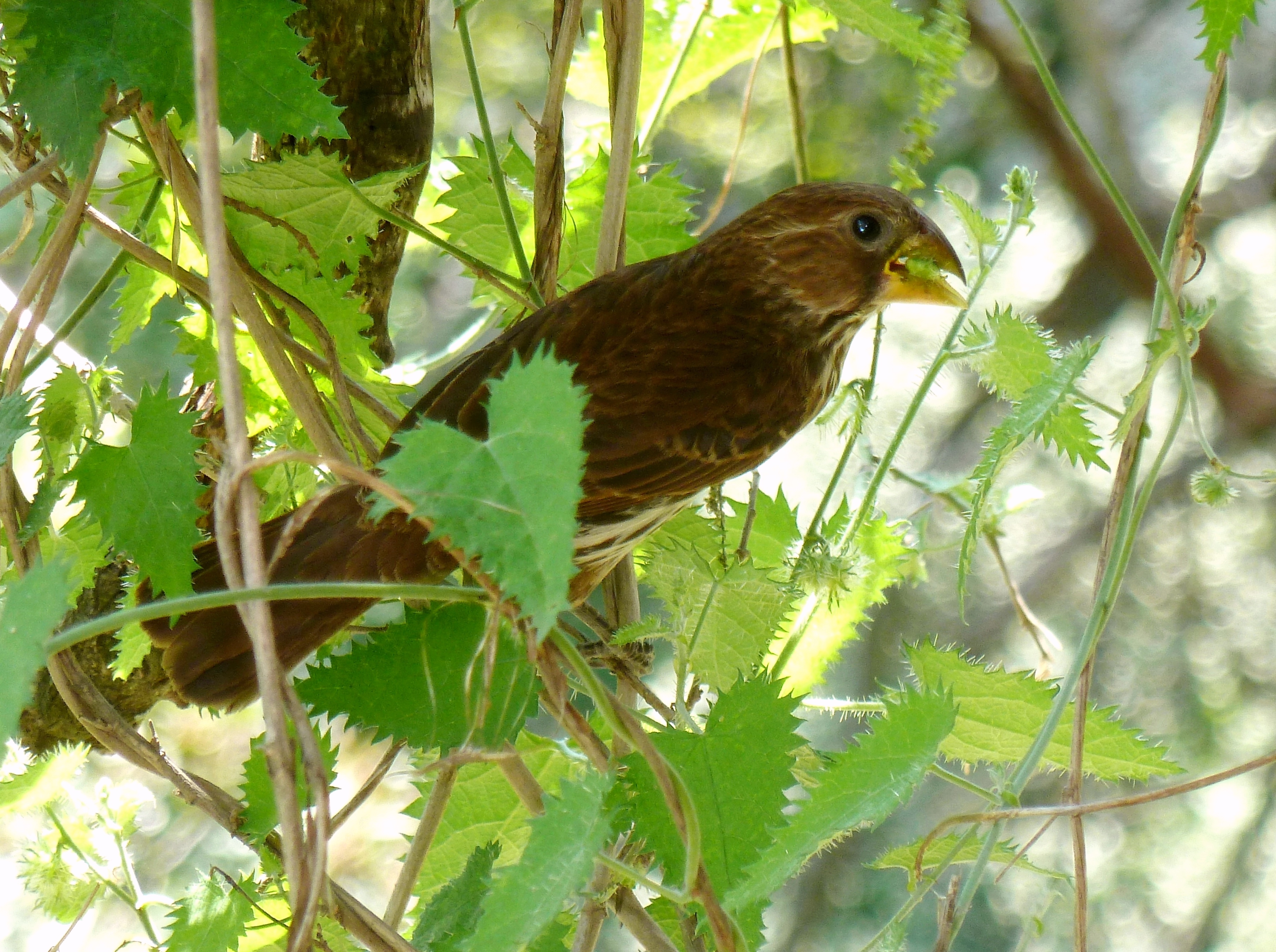
Female feeding on nettle nutlets in a mountain ravine

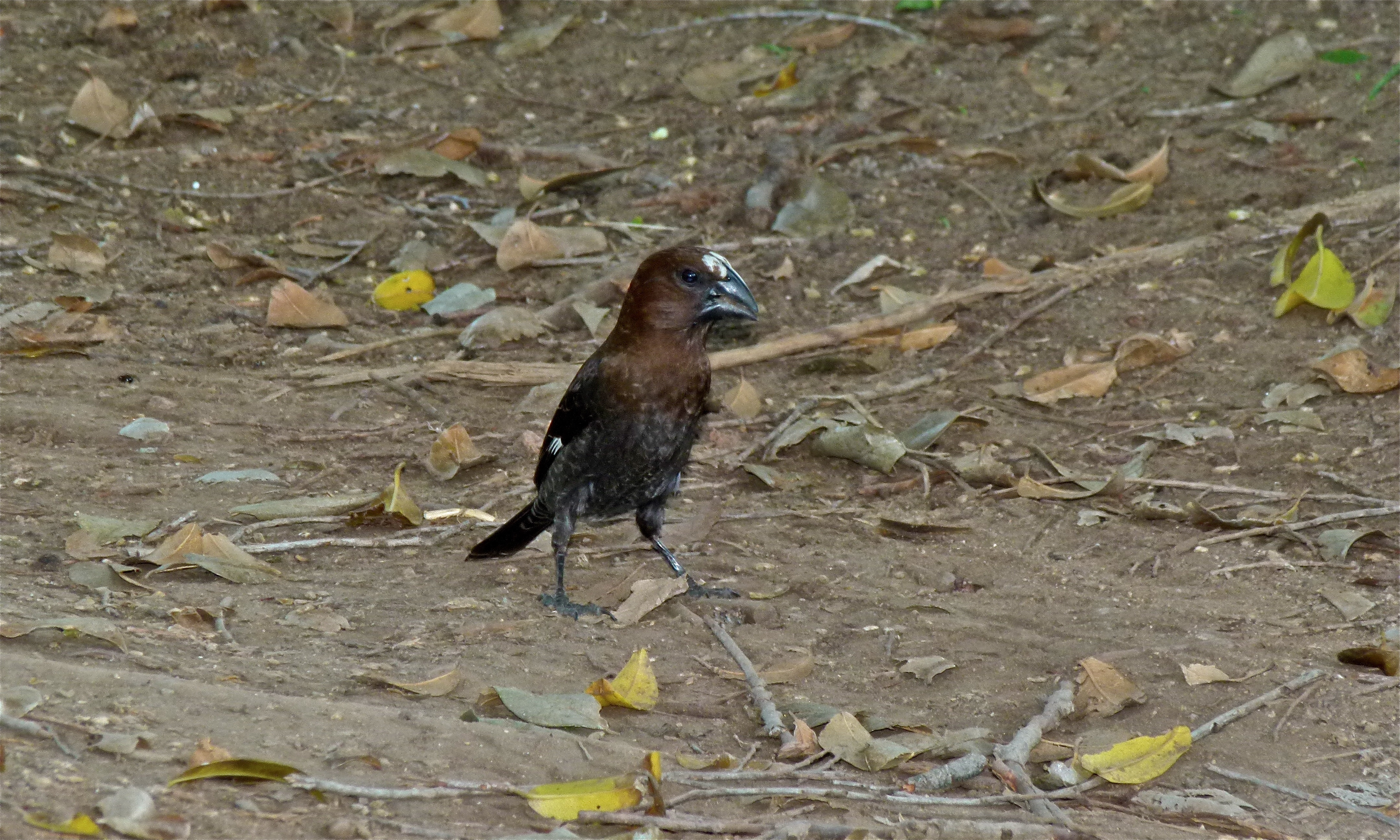
Male foraging on ground on a river bank
