= Ploceus melanotis =

Ploceus melanotis may refer to:

- redundant name of little weaver
- invalid name for red-headed weaver
