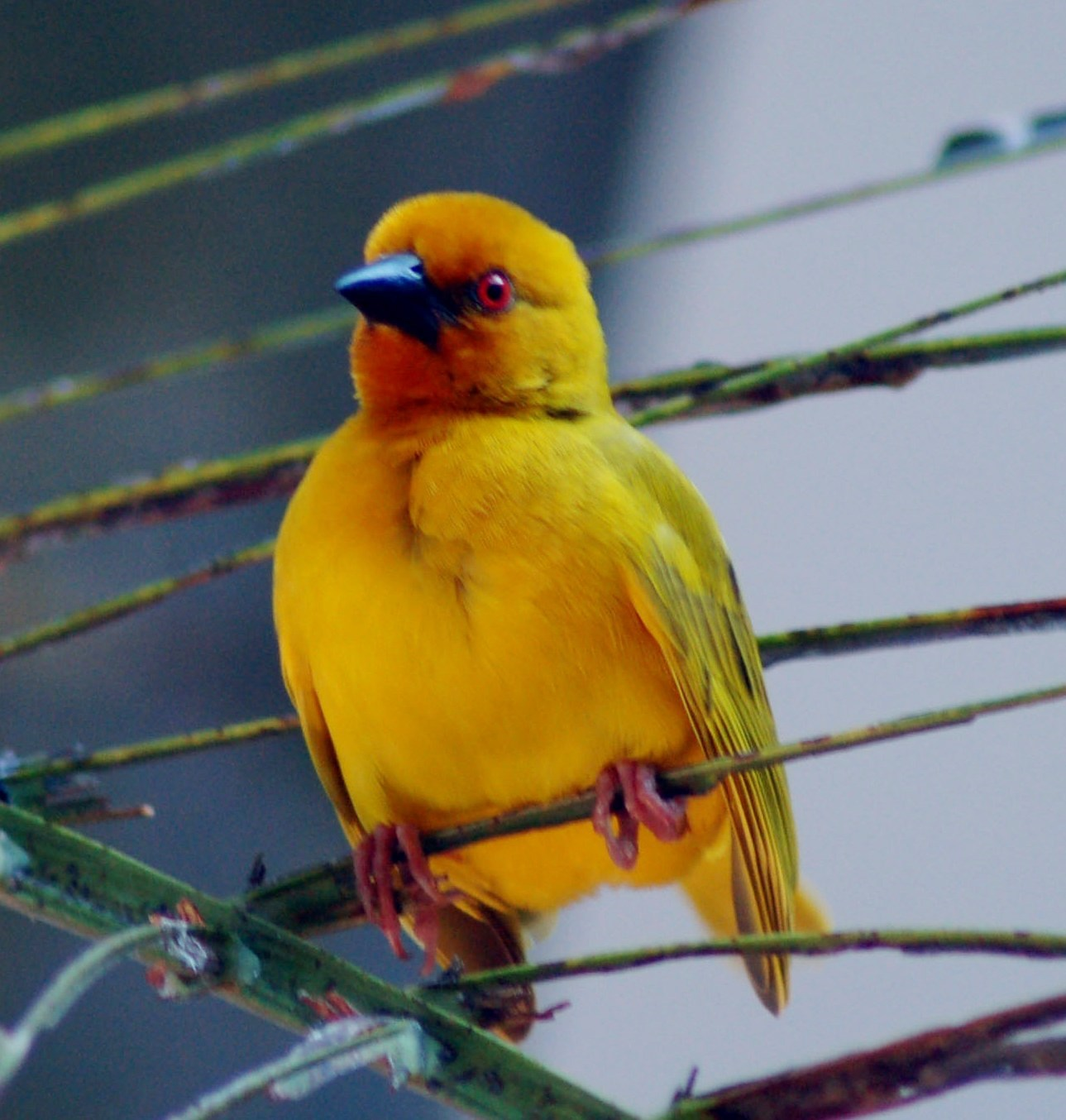
- Photographed in Zanzibar

Conservation status
- Least Concern (IUCN 3.1)

Scientific classification
- Kingdom: Animalia
- Phylum: Chordata
- Class: Aves
- Order: Passeriformes
- Family: Ploceidae
- Genus: Ploceus
- Species: P. subaureus

Binomial name
- Ploceus subaureus Smith, 1839

= Eastern golden weaver =

Bird in the family Ploceidae from eastern and southern Africa

The eastern golden weaver (Ploceus subaureus) is a species of bird in the family Ploceidae. It is found in eastern and south-eastern Africa. Alternative names used for the eastern golden weaver include yellow weaver, olive-headed golden weaver, and African golden weaver.
