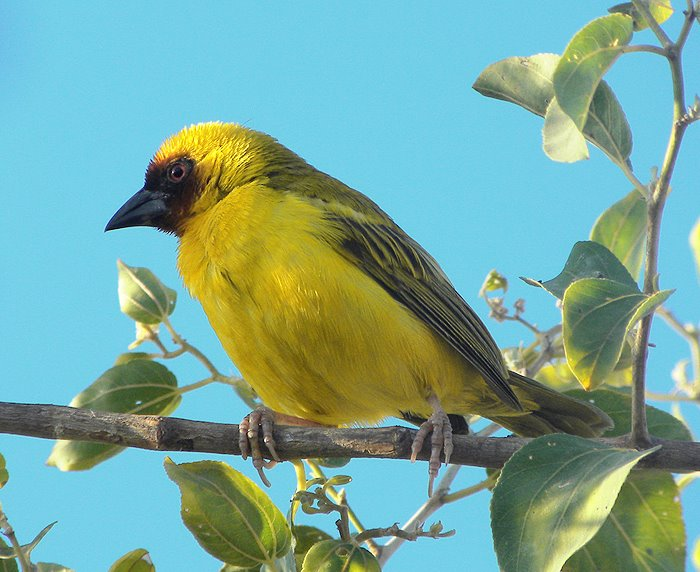

Conservation status
- Least Concern (IUCN 3.1)

Scientific classification
- Kingdom: Animalia
- Phylum: Chordata
- Class: Aves
- Order: Passeriformes
- Family: Ploceidae
- Genus: Ploceus
- Species: P. galbula

Binomial name
- Ploceus galbula Rüppell, 1840

= Rüppell's weaver =

Species of bird

Rüppell's weaver (Ploceus galbula) is a species of bird in the family Ploceidae, which is native to the northern Afrotropics. The species is named after the German zoologist and explorer Eduard Rüppell (1794–1884).

== Range ==
It is found from Sudan to Somalia and extreme northern Kenya. It is also found in the south-western Arabian Peninsula.

== Habitat ==
In the mountains of Degua Tembien in north Ethiopia, it can be observed in bushy and shrubby areas.

== Gallery ==
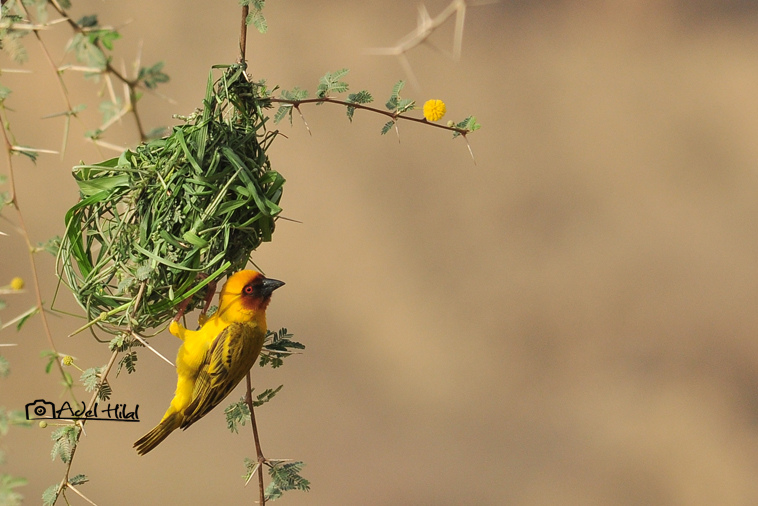
Male at nest

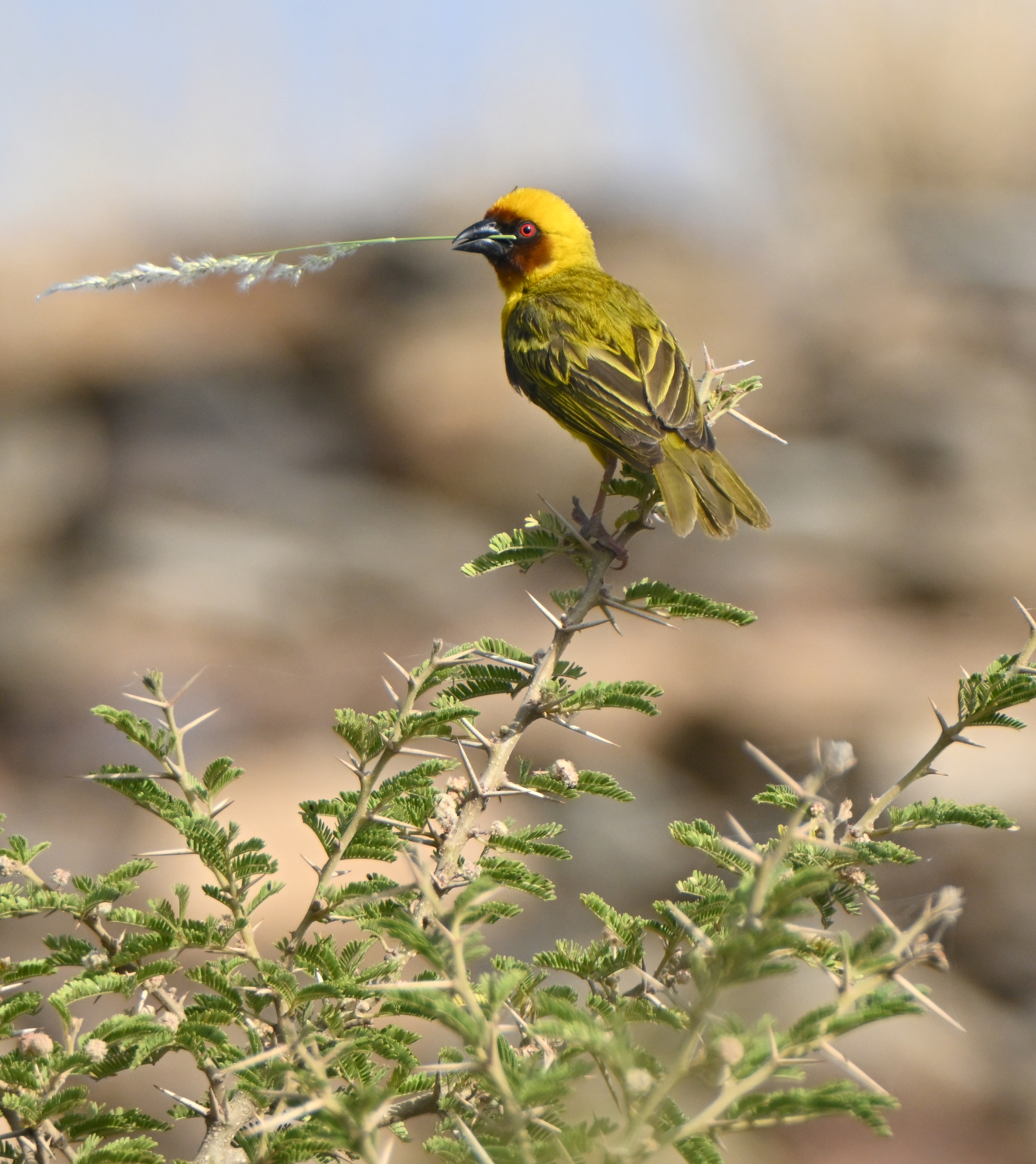

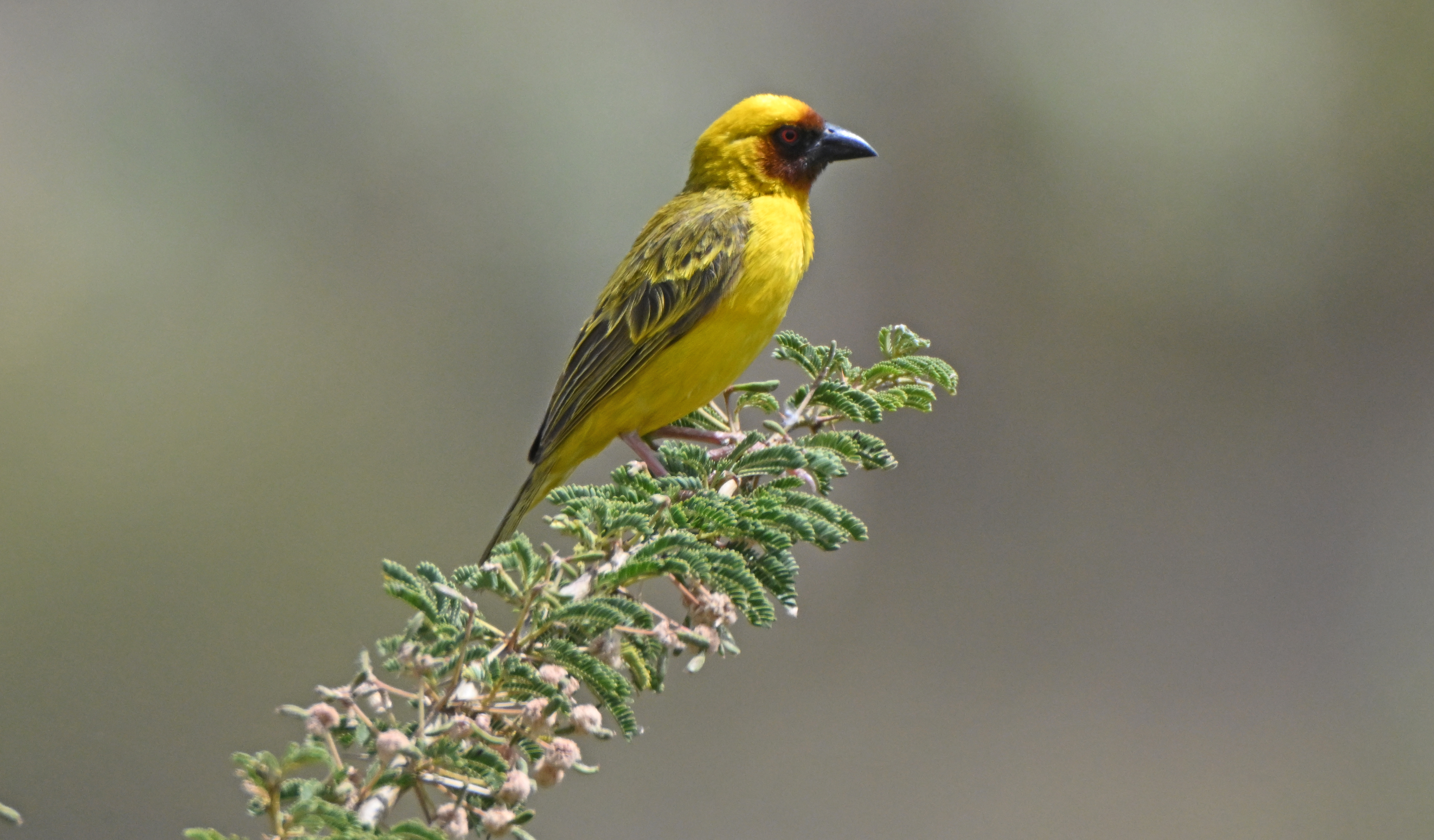

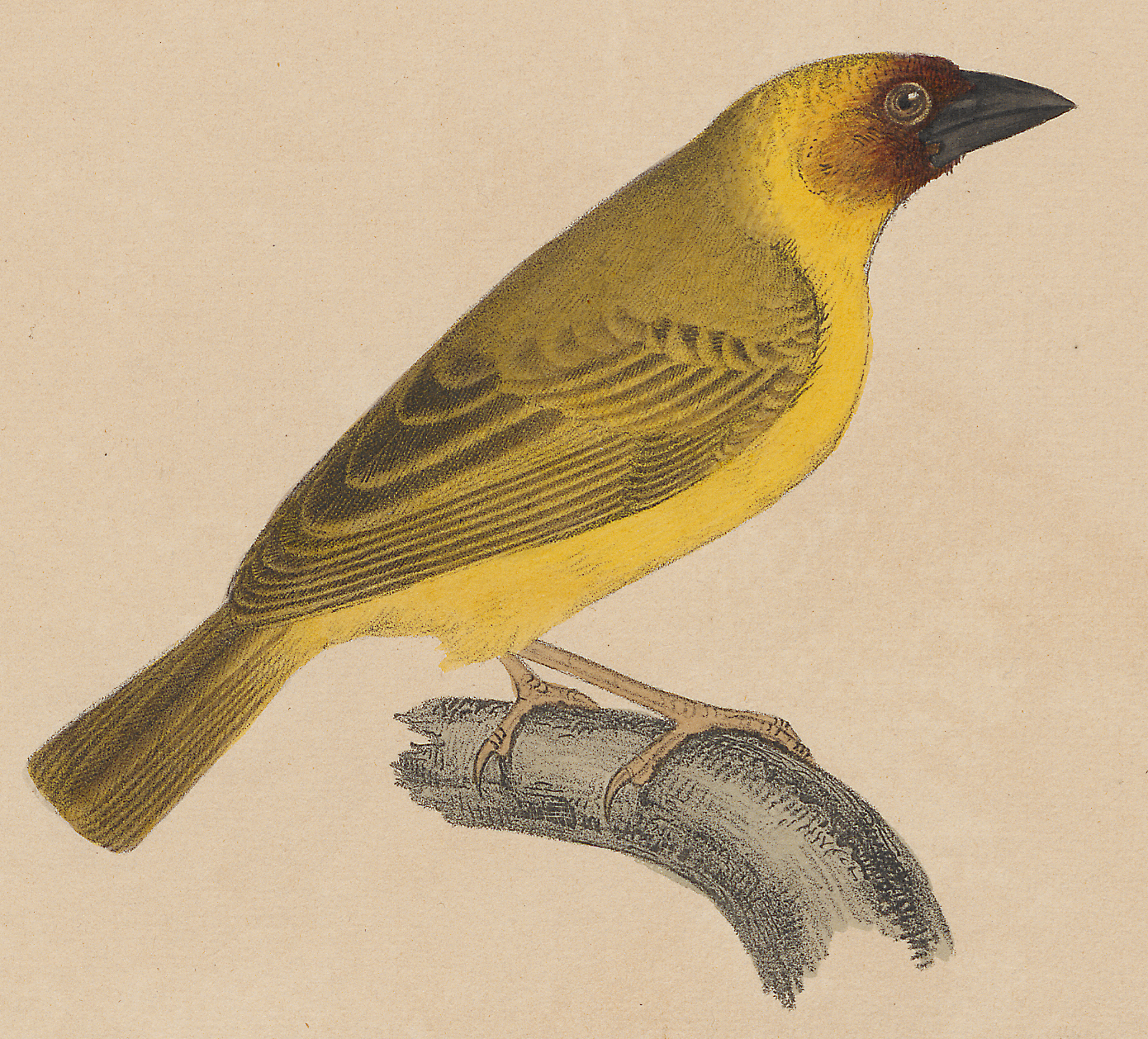
Illustration from Rüppell, 1840

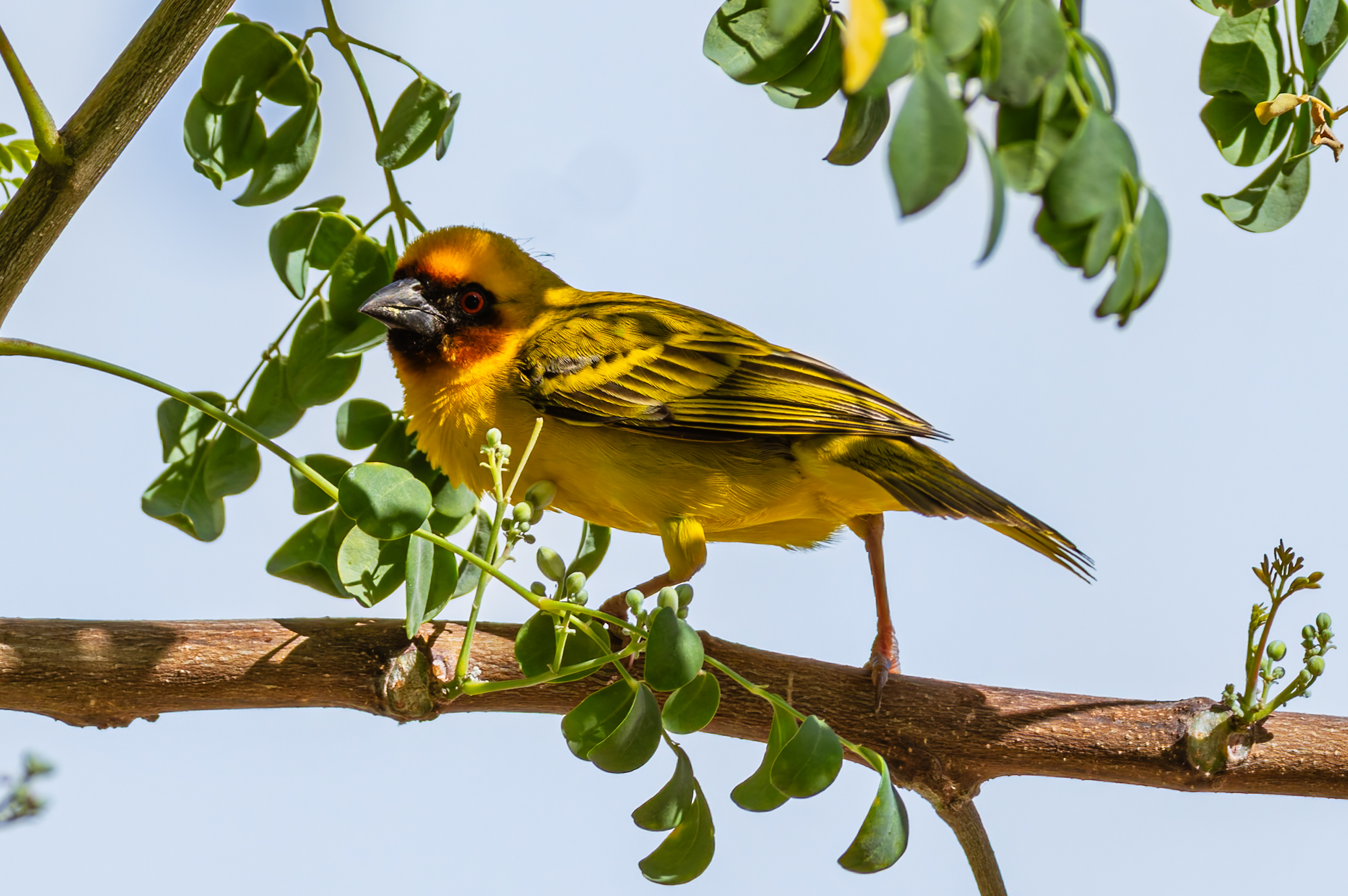
male, Oman
