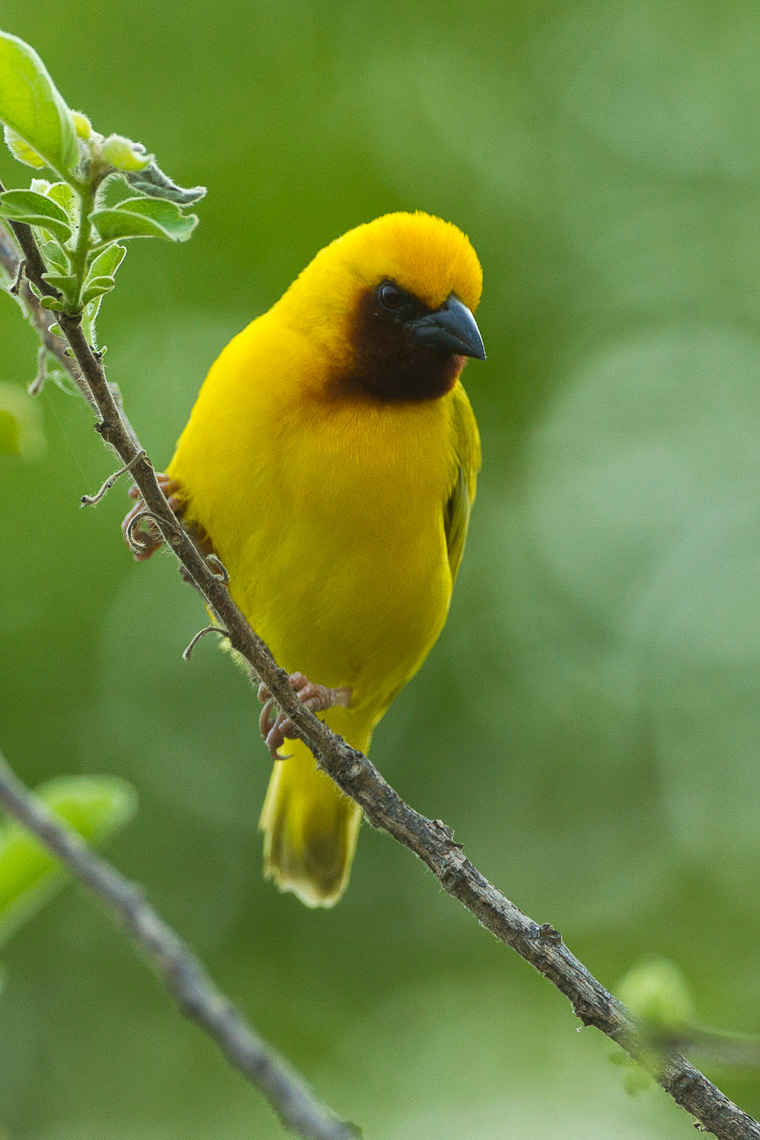
- P. x. xanthopterus, Malawi

Conservation status
- Least Concern (IUCN 3.1)

Scientific classification
- Kingdom: Animalia
- Phylum: Chordata
- Class: Aves
- Order: Passeriformes
- Family: Ploceidae
- Genus: Ploceus
- Species: P. xanthopterus

Binomial name
- Ploceus xanthopterus (Hartlaub & Finsch, 1870)

= Southern brown-throated weaver =

Species of bird

The southern brown-throated weaver (Ploceus xanthopterus) is a species of bird in the family Ploceidae. It is found in southern Africa.

== Gallery ==
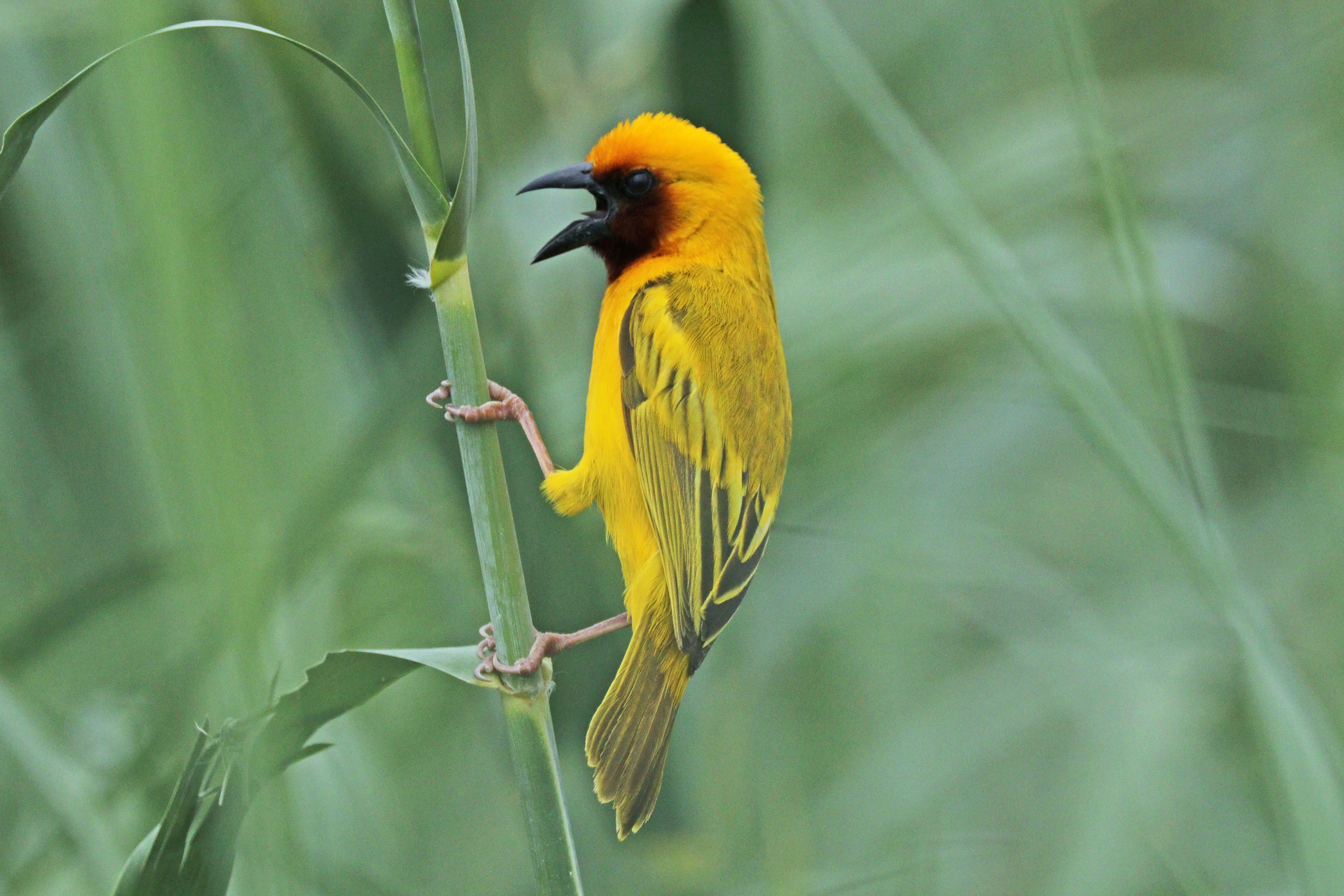
P. x. castaneigula, Namibia

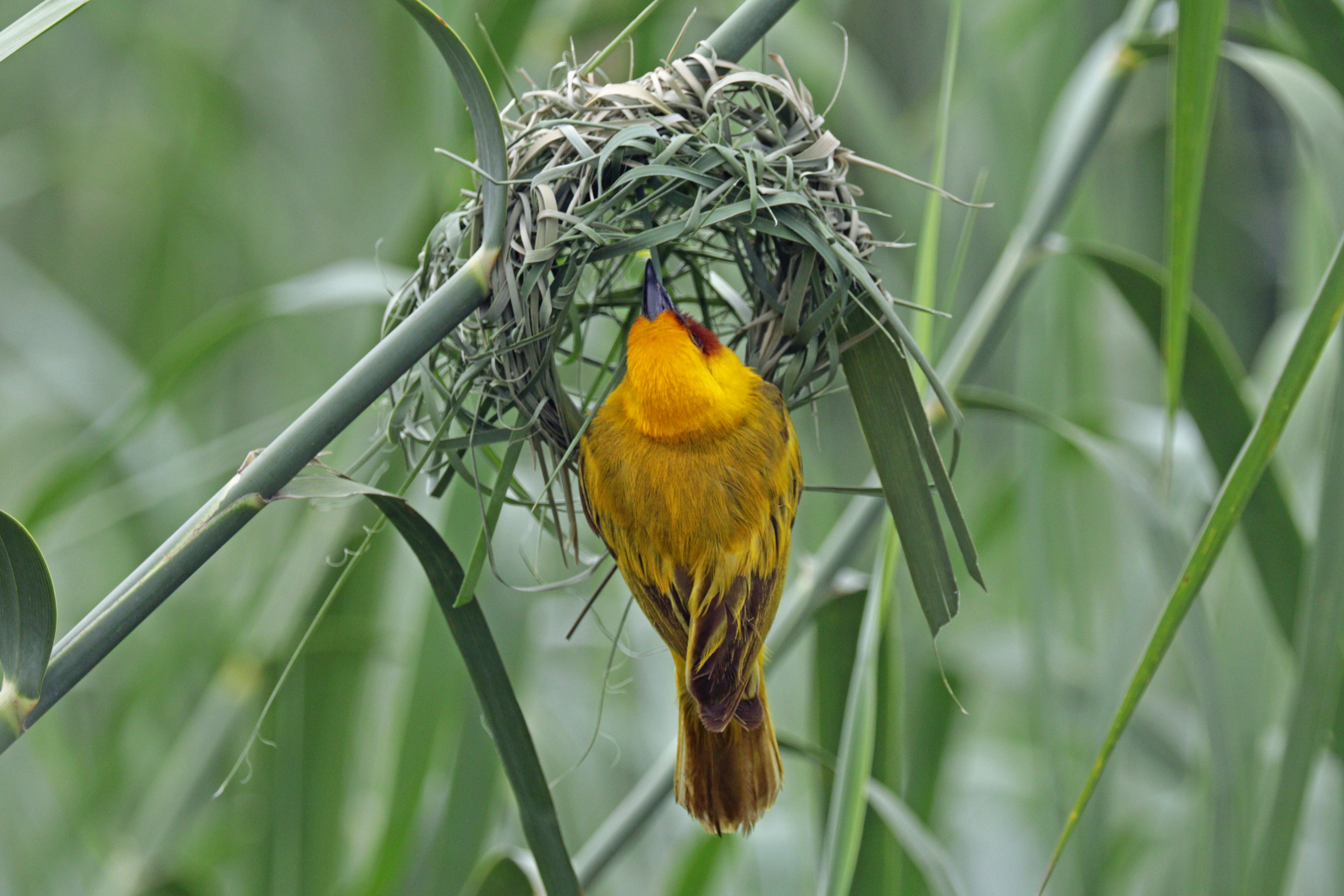
P. x. castaneigula, Namibia
