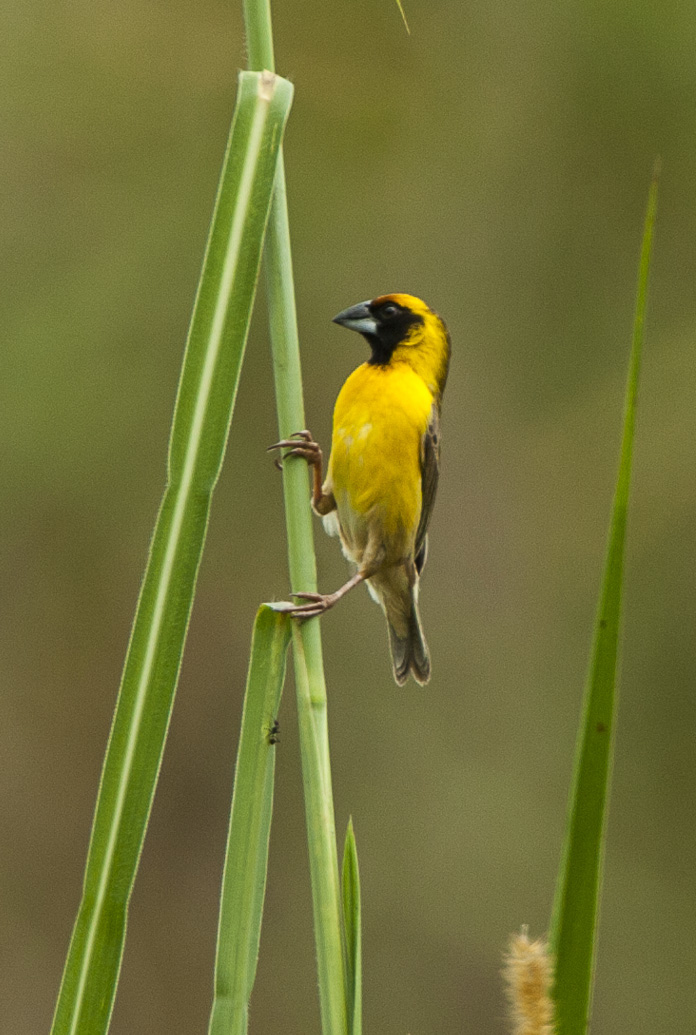

Conservation status
- Least Concern (IUCN 3.1)

Scientific classification
- Kingdom: Animalia
- Phylum: Chordata
- Class: Aves
- Order: Passeriformes
- Family: Ploceidae
- Genus: Pachyphantes; Shelley, 1896
- Species: P. superciliosus

Binomial name
- Pachyphantes superciliosus (Shelley, 1873)

Synonyms
- Ploceus superciliosus

= Compact weaver =

Species of bird

The compact weaver (Pachyphantes superciliosus) is a species of bird in the family Ploceidae. It is the only species placed in the genus Pachyphantes. It has a highly discontinuous distribution from Senegal to Liberia, east to Ethiopia and south to Angola and the Democratic Republic of the Congo.

== Taxonomy ==
The compact weaver was formally described in 1873 as Hyphantornis superciliosus by the English ornithologist George Ernest Shelley based on specimens collected in West Africa. The specific epithet is Latin meaning "haughty" or "eyebrowed" from supercilium meaning "eyebrow". The compact weaver is now the only species placed in the genus Pachyphantes that was introduced for the species by Shelley in 1896. The genus name combines the Ancient Greek παχυς/pakhus meaning "large" or "thick" with ὑφαντης/huphantēs meaning "weaver". A molecular genetic study of the weaverbirds published in 2017 found that the compact weaver was sister to clade containing the fodies in the genus Foudia. The species is monotypic: no subspecies are recognised.

== Distribution and habitat ==
Its natural habitat is subtropical or tropical seasonally wet or flooded lowland grassland.
