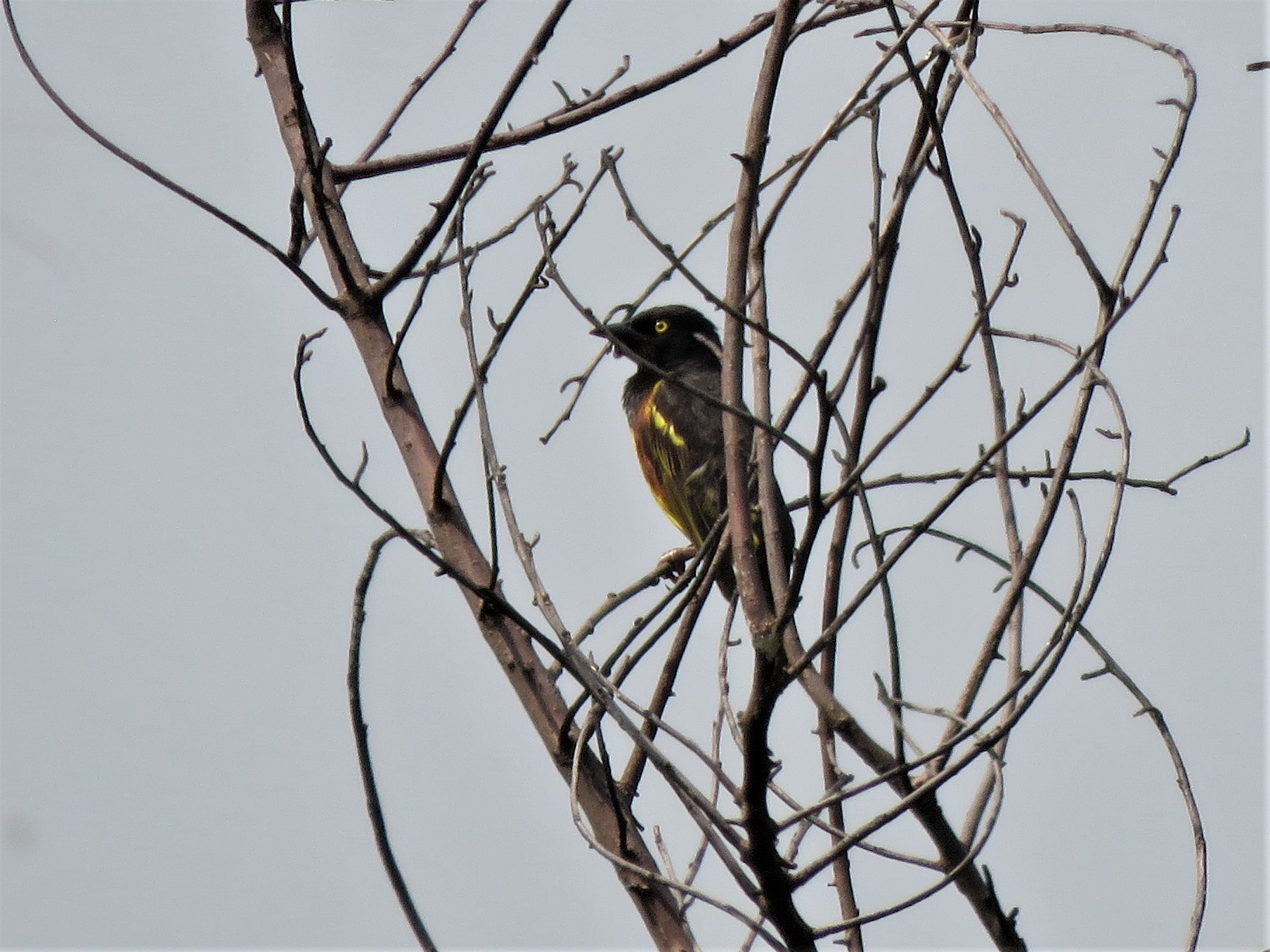

Conservation status
- Least Concern (IUCN 3.1)

Scientific classification
- Kingdom: Animalia
- Phylum: Chordata
- Class: Aves
- Order: Passeriformes
- Family: Ploceidae
- Genus: Ploceus
- Species: P. weynsi

Binomial name
- Ploceus weynsi (Dubois, 1900)

= Weyns's weaver =

Species of bird

Wayne's weaver (Placeus weynsi) is a bird species of the Ploceidae family.

== Taxonomy ==
Weyns's Weaver belongs to the Animalia Kingdom, the Chordata Phylum, the Aves Class, the Passeriformes Order, the Ploceidae Family, and the Ploceus Genus. The species name for the Weyns's Weaver is Ploceus weysni. This species is monotypic, meaning that it does not encompass any infraspecific taxa such as a subspecies.

== Description ==
Weyns's Weaver differs from males to females in a number of physical characteristics. On average, males (24-36g) are heavier than females (23-34g). Made up of black, olive-green, yellow, and brown, males are much darker in appearance than females, who are much more yellow. Males have a black head and back, with a yellow and orange belly. Younger birds are mostly yellow with hints of black, closely resembling females.

=== Vocalizations ===
Weyns's Weaver emit a high-pitched sizzling sound. Their songs are filled with many chirps and longer squeaking sounds. They are relatively quiet, unless they are joined by others.

== Distribution and habitat ==
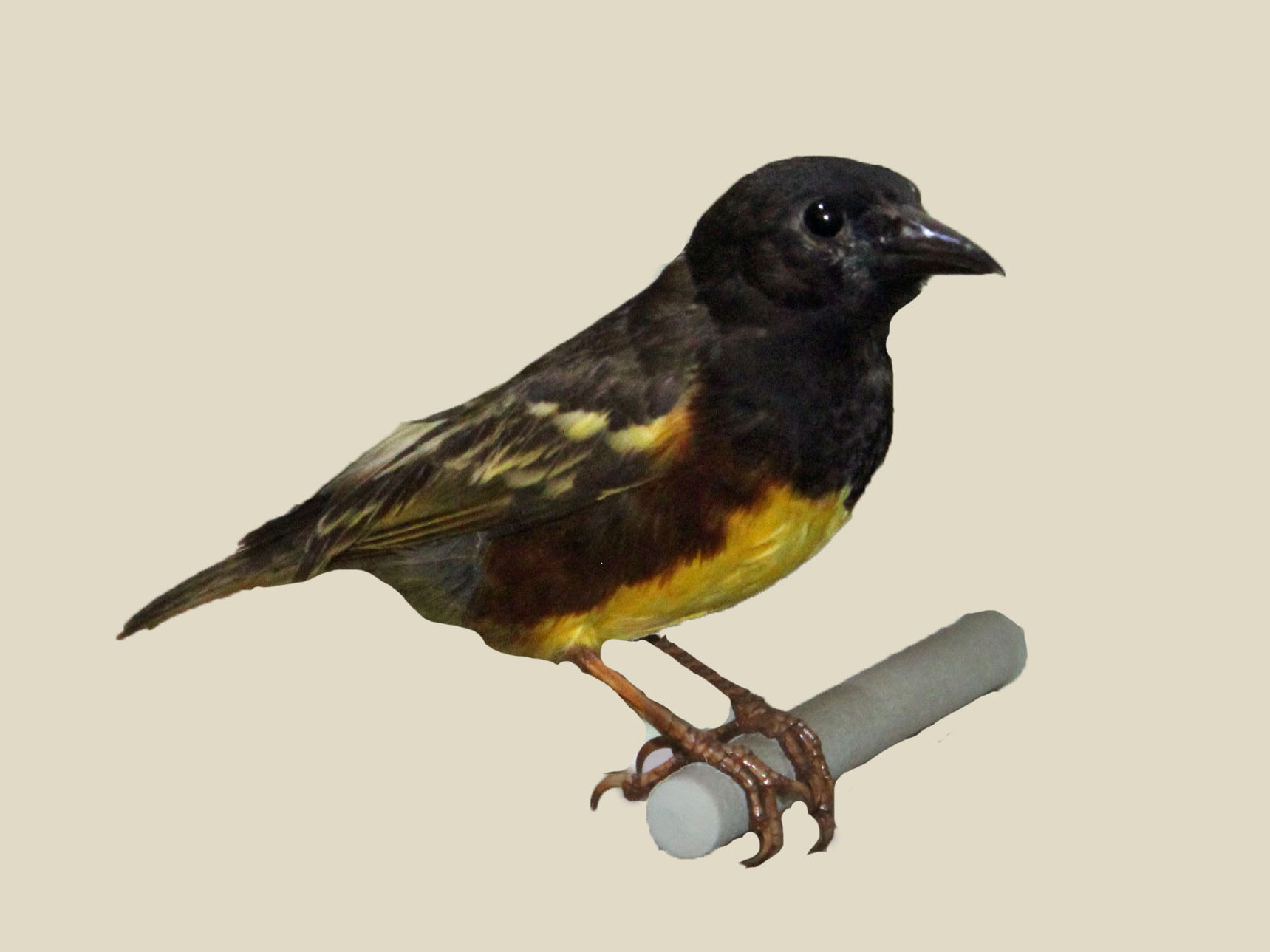
at Nairobi National Museum (eyes should be yellow).

Weyns's Weaver is found in countries throughout Africa. These include the Northeast Democratic Republic of the Congo, South Uganda, Northwest Tanzania, and Kenya. Its entire range is a conservation area. This bird is most likely found in terrestrial areas, as well as forests with tall trees and wetlands. This Weaver is attracted to inland water bodies.

== Biology ==
Weyns's Weaver appears to wander erratically. It is not migratory. From June through September, it is absent from shore areas. This implies that their movements depend on the seasons.

Fruits, including wild figs, make up the majority of the diet. Their diet is seen mainly throughout the forest canopy. This bird frequently forages in pairs or flocks, doing most everything in groups. Feeding flocks are typically made up of 20 individuals, however, on occasion, they can reach 200 or more.

=== Breeding ===
The adults in the Democratic Republic of the Congo are observed to have enlarged gonads in the months of April through June. In areas like Uganda, these changes occur during the months of June and July, and the offspring emerge in November. Following the breeding period, moulting occurs September to November.

== Conservation status ==
Weyns's Weaver is a species of least concern. This species can be encountered in reasonable numbers, and is not globally threatened, for they have a stable population trend. This bird is locally common, but its presence is often unpredictable. Their population is predicted to be stable for at least their generational length of 4 years in the absence of any declines of substantial threats.
