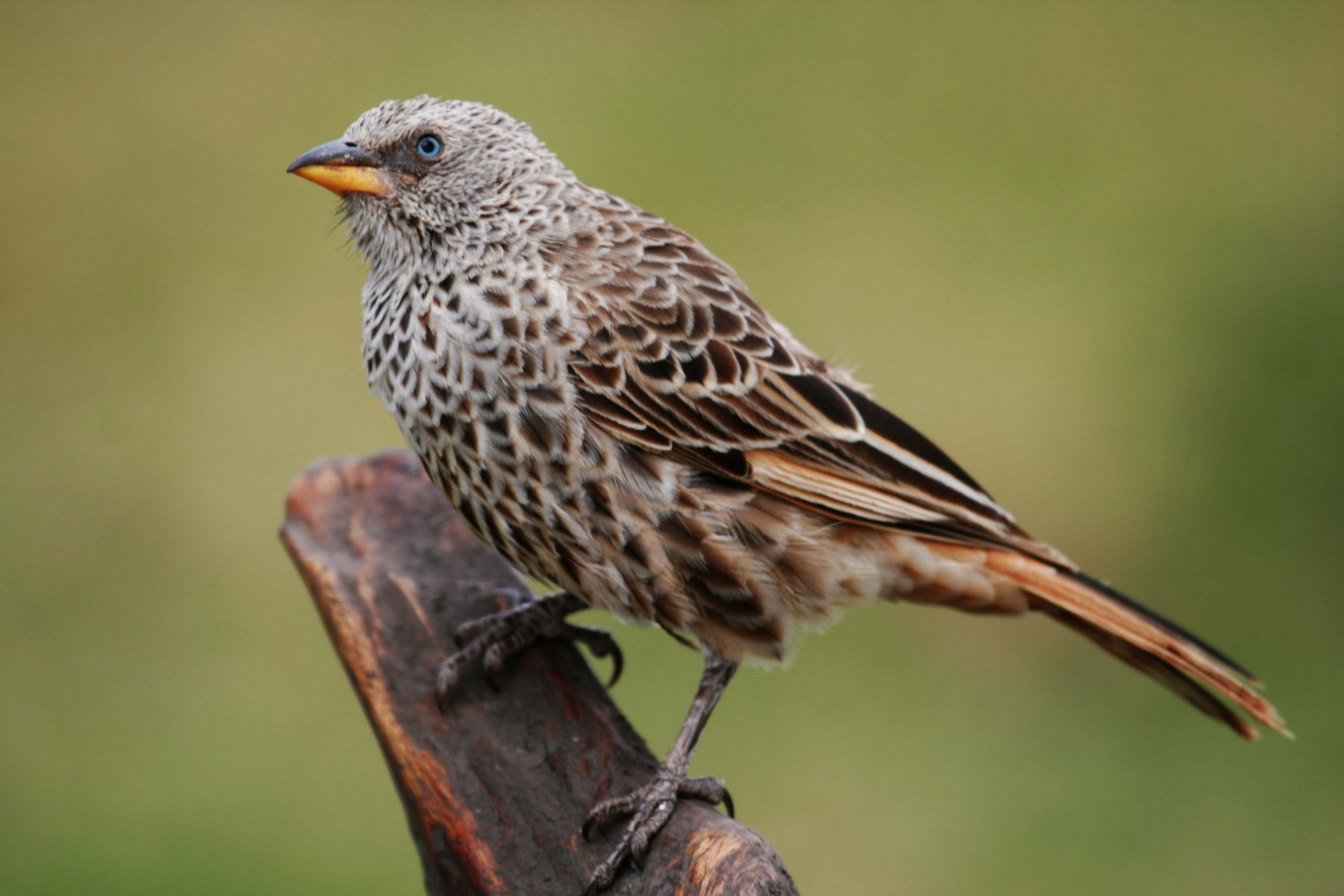

Conservation status
- Least Concern (IUCN 3.1)

Scientific classification
- Kingdom: Animalia
- Phylum: Chordata
- Class: Aves
- Order: Passeriformes
- Family: Ploceidae
- Genus: Histurgops; Reichenow, 1887
- Species: H. ruficauda

Binomial name
- Histurgops ruficauda Reichenow, 1887

Synonyms
- Histurgops ruficaudus

= Rufous-tailed weaver =

Species of bird

The rufous-tailed weaver (Histurgops ruficauda) is a species of songbird found in Tanzania.

It is included in the weaver family (Ploceidae), but many authors included it in the Old World sparrow family Passeridae when Old World sparrows were separated from the weavers proper. It is placed in the monotypic genus Histurgops.

It is an endemic breeder in Tanzania, but vagrants occur in Kenya too.
