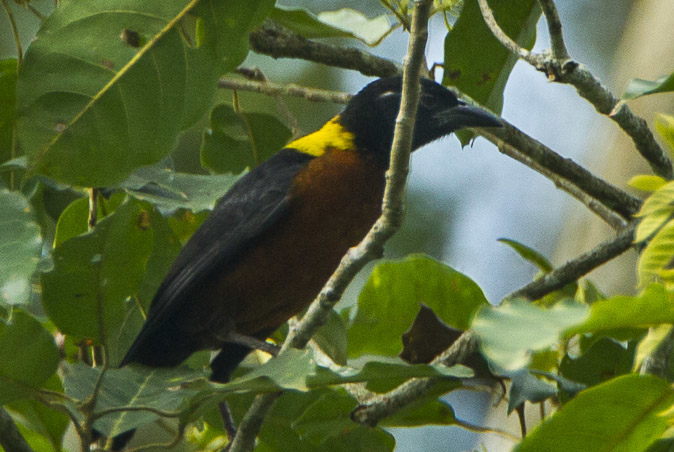

Conservation status
- Least Concern (IUCN 3.1)

Scientific classification
- Kingdom: Animalia
- Phylum: Chordata
- Class: Aves
- Order: Passeriformes
- Family: Ploceidae
- Genus: Ploceus
- Species: P. tricolor

Binomial name
- Ploceus tricolor (Hartlaub, 1854)

= Yellow-mantled weaver =

Species of bird

The yellow-mantled weaver (Ploceus tricolor) is a species of bird in the family Ploceidae. It is sparsely distributed across the African tropical rainforest.
