= Tanzanian masked weaver =

Conservation status
- Least Concern (IUCN 3.1)

Scientific classification
- Kingdom: Animalia
- Phylum: Chordata
- Class: Aves
- Order: Passeriformes
- Family: Ploceidae
- Genus: Ploceus
- Species: P. reichardi

Binomial name
- Ploceus reichardi Reichenow, 1886

Species of bird

The Tanzanian masked weaver (Ploceus reichardi), or Tanganyika masked weaver, is a species of bird in the weaver family, Ploceidae. It is found in and around swamps in south-western Tanzania and north-eastern Zambia. The Lufira masked weaver is sometimes treated as a subspecies of this bird.
