= Lufira masked weaver =

Conservation status
- Least Concern (IUCN 3.1)

Scientific classification
- Kingdom: Animalia
- Phylum: Chordata
- Class: Aves
- Order: Passeriformes
- Family: Ploceidae
- Genus: Ploceus
- Species: P. ruweti

Binomial name
- Ploceus ruweti Louette & Benson, 1982

Synonyms
- Ploceus reichardi ruweti

Species of bird

The Lufira masked weaver (Ploceus ruweti), also known as Ruwet's masked weaver or the Lake Lufira weaver, is a species of bird in the weaver family, Ploceidae. It is endemic to the Democratic Republic of the Congo. Its natural habitat is swamps in the south-east part of the country. It is sometimes regarded as a subspecies of the Tanzanian masked weaver.
