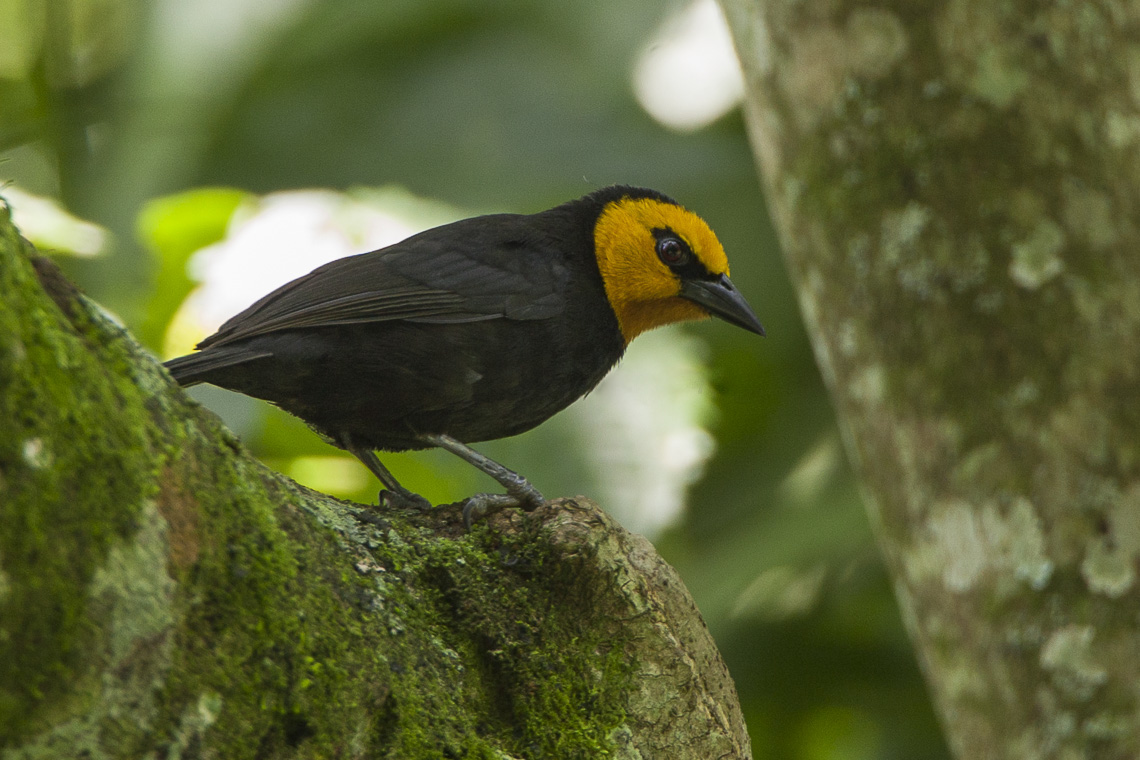

Conservation status
- Least Concern (IUCN 3.1)

Scientific classification
- Kingdom: Animalia
- Phylum: Chordata
- Class: Aves
- Order: Passeriformes
- Family: Ploceidae
- Genus: Ploceus
- Species: P. melanogaster

Binomial name
- Ploceus melanogaster Shelley, 1887

= Black-billed weaver =

Species of bird

The black-billed weaver (Ploceus melanogaster) is a species of bird in the family Ploceidae. It has multiple isolated elevated populations across sub-Saharan Africa : the Western High Plateau, the Albertine Rift montane forests and the East African montane forests.
