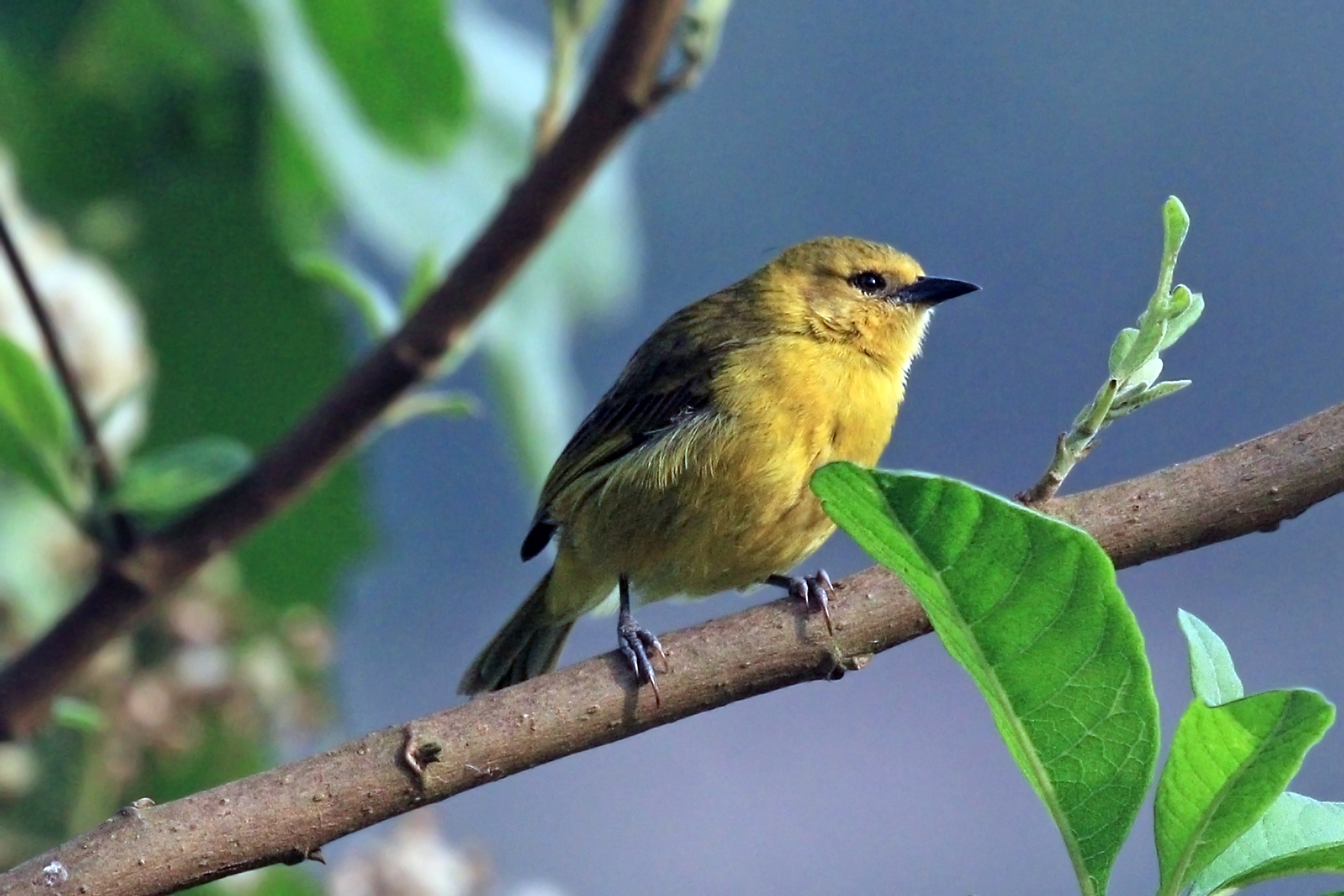
- female P. p. perzelni, Uganda

Conservation status
- Least Concern (IUCN 3.1)

Scientific classification
- Kingdom: Animalia
- Phylum: Chordata
- Class: Aves
- Order: Passeriformes
- Family: Ploceidae
- Genus: Ploceus
- Species: P. pelzelni

Binomial name
- Ploceus pelzelni (Hartlaub, 1887)

= Slender-billed weaver =

Species of bird

The slender-billed weaver (Ploceus pelzelni) is a species of bird in the weaver family, Ploceidae. It is sparsely distributed across equatorial Africa, namely along the shoreline of the Gulf of Guinea and Congo River and the Lake Victoria region.

== Gallery ==
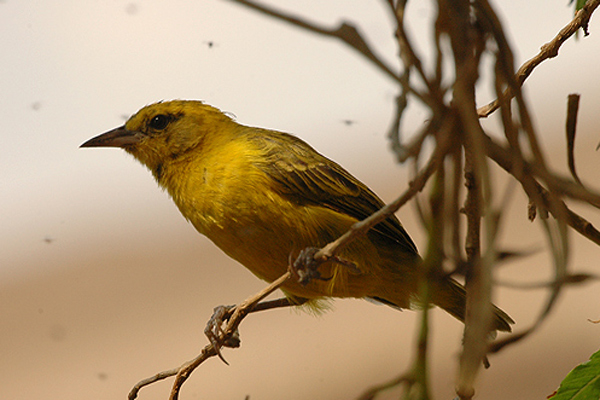
Female Queen Elizabeth NP, Uganda

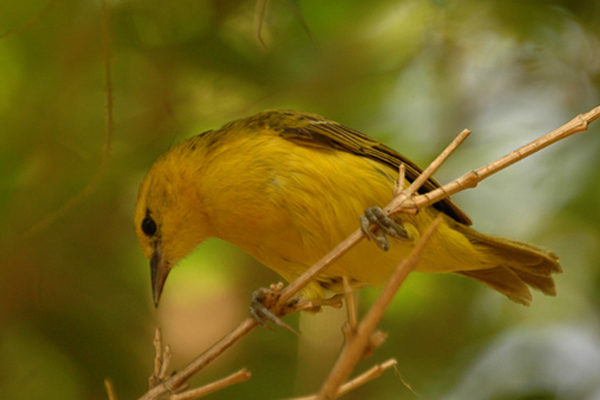
Female Queen Elizabeth NP, Uganda
