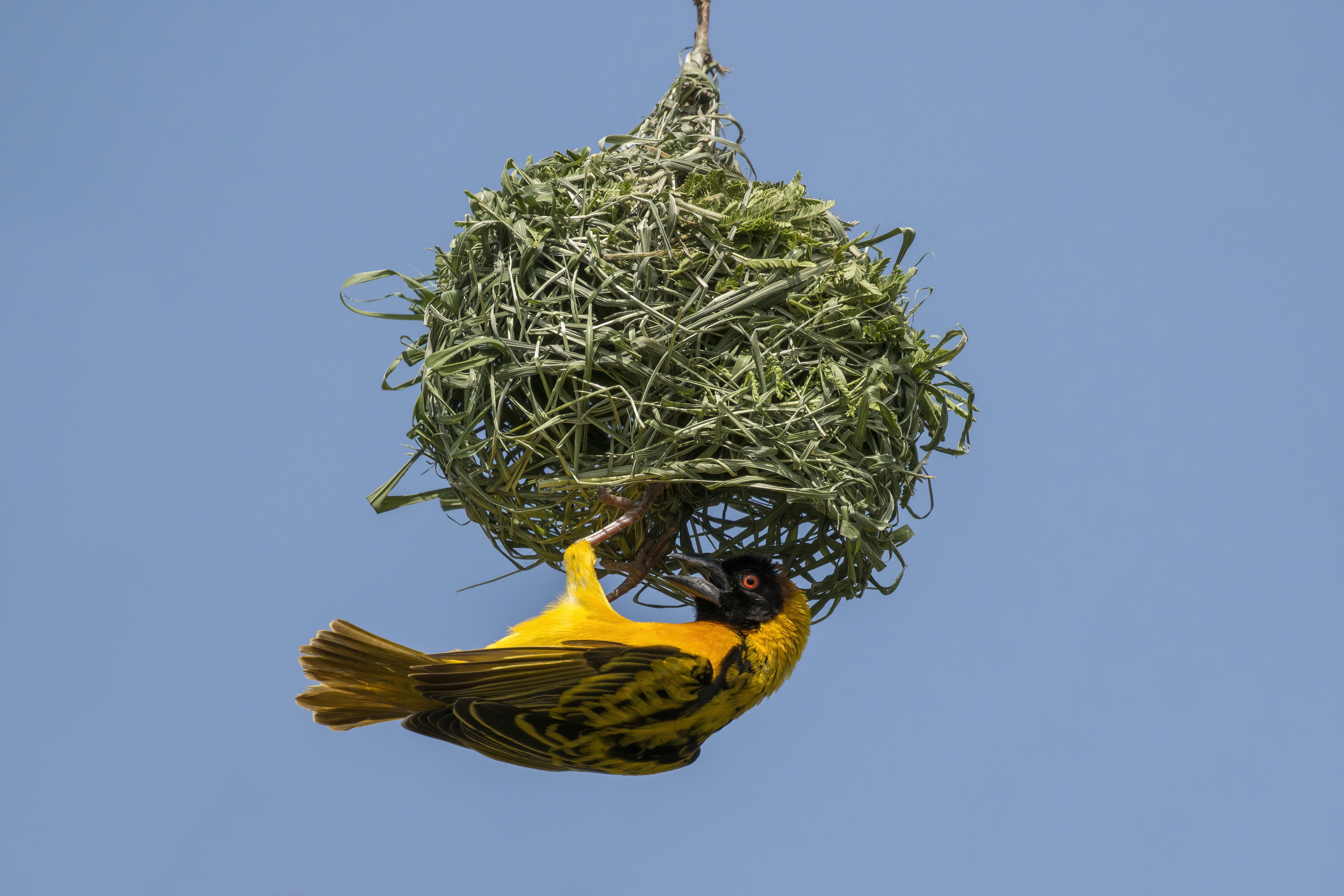
- A male village weaver (Ploceus cucullatus bohndorffi), building his nest

Scientific classification
- Kingdom: Animalia
- Phylum: Chordata
- Class: Aves
- Order: Passeriformes
- Superfamily: Ploceoidea
- Family: Ploceidae; Sundevall, 1836

Type genus
- Ploceus

Genera
- See text.

= Ploceidae =

Weavers

Family of small passerine birds

Ploceidae is a family of small passerine birds, many of which are called weavers, weaverbirds, weaver finches, or bishops. These names come from the nests of intricately woven vegetation created by birds in this family. In most recent classifications, the Ploceidae are a clade that excludes some birds that have historically been placed in the family, such as some of the sparrows, but which includes the monotypic subfamily Amblyospizinae. The family is believed to have originated in the mid-Miocene. All birds of the Ploceidae are native to the Old World, most in Africa south of the Sahara, though a few live in tropical areas of Asia. A few species have been introduced outside their native range.

== Taxonomy and systematics ==
The family Ploceidae was introduced (as Ploceïdes) by Swedish zoologist Carl Jakob Sundevall in 1836. Phylogenetic studies have shown that the family is sister to a clade containing the families Viduidae and Estrildidae Their common ancestor lived in the middle Miocene around 18 million years ago.

A 2017 molecular phylogenetic study by Thilina de Silva and collaborators, as well as an expanded study by the same group published in 2019 have indicated that the genus Ploceus as currently defined is polyphyletic. A cladogram based on these results is shown below.

- Ploceidae
  - - Amblyospiza – thick-billed weaver
    - - - Sporopipes – 2 species (weavers)
        - - Plocepasser – 4 species (sparrow-weavers)
          - - Philetairus – sociable weaver
            - Pseudonigrita – 2 species (social weavers)
      - - - Dinemellia – white-headed buffalo weaver
          - Bubalornis – 2 species (buffalo weavers)
        - - - Euplectes – 18 species (bishops and widowbirds)
            - - Ploceus – 5 species (Asian weavers)
              - - Quelea – 3 species (queleas)
                - - Pachyphantes – compact weaver
                  - Foudia – 8 species (fodies)
          - - Ploceus – 2 species (Sakalava weaver and Nelicourvi weaver)
            - Ploceus+Malimbus+Anaplectes – 60 + 10 + 2 = 72 species

=== Genera ===
The family includes 16 genera with a total of 122 species. For more detail, see list of Ploceidae species.

Image	Genus	Species
	Bubalornis A. Smith, 1836	Red-billed buffalo weaver (Bubalornis niger); White-billed buffalo weaver (Bubalornis albirostris)
	Dinemellia Reichenbach, 1863	White-headed buffalo weaver (Dinemellia dinemelli)
	Plocepasser A. Smith, 1836	Donaldson Smith's sparrow-weaver (Plocepasser donaldsoni); Chestnut-backed sparrow-weaver (Plocepasser rufoscapulatus); Chestnut-crowned sparrow-weaver (Plocepasser superciliosus); White-browed sparrow-weaver (Plocepasser mahali)
	Histurgops Reichenow, 1887	Rufous-tailed weaver (Histurgops ruficauda)
	Pseudonigrita Reichenow, 1903	Grey-capped social weaver (Pseudonigrita arnaudi); Black-capped social weaver (Pseudonigrita cabanisi)
	Philetairus A. Smith, 1837	Sociable weaver (Philetairus socius)
	Sporopipes Cabanis, 1847	Speckle-fronted weaver (Sporopipes frontalis); Scaly-feathered weaver (Sporopipes squamifrons)
	Amblyospiza Sundevall, 1850	Thick-billed weaver (Amblyospiza albifrons)
	Ploceus Cuvier, 1816	Baglafecht weaver (Ploceus baglafecht); Bannerman's weaver (Ploceus bannermani); Bates's weaver (Ploceus batesi); Black-chinned weaver (Ploceus nigrimentus); Bertram's weaver (Ploceus bertrandi); Slender-billed weaver (Ploceus pelzelni); Loango weaver (Ploceus subpersonatus); Little weaver (Ploceus luteolus); Spectacled weaver (Ploceus ocularis); Black-necked weaver (Ploceus nigricollis); Olive-naped weaver (Ploceus brachypterus); Strange weaver (Ploceus alienus); Black-billed weaver (Ploceus melanogaster); Cape weaver (Ploceus capensis); Bocage's weaver (Ploceus temporalis); Eastern golden weaver (Ploceus subaureus); Holub's golden weaver (Ploceus xanthops); Orange weaver (Ploceus aurantius); Heuglin's masked weaver (Ploceus heuglini); Golden palm weaver (Ploceus bojeri); Taveta weaver (Ploceus castaneiceps); Príncipe weaver (Ploceus princeps); Northern brown-throated weaver (Ploceus castanops); Southern brown-throated weaver (Ploceus xanthopterus); Ruvu weaver (Ploceus holoxanthus); Kilombero weaver (Ploceus burnieri); Rüppell's weaver (Ploceus galbula); Northern masked weaver (Ploceus taeniopterus); Lesser masked weaver (Ploceus intermedius); Southern masked weaver (Ploceus velatus); Katanga masked weaver (Ploceus katangae); Lufira masked weaver (Ploceus ruweti); Tanzanian masked weaver (Ploceus reichardi); Vitelline masked weaver (Ploceus vitellinus); Speke's weaver (Ploceus spekei); Fox's weaver (Ploceus spekeoides); Village weaver (Ploceus cucullatus); Giant weaver (Ploceus grandis); Vieillot's black weaver (Ploceus nigerrimus); Chestnut-and-black weaver (Ploceus castaneofuscus); Weyns's weaver (Ploceus weynsi); Kilifi weaver (Ploceus golandi); Juba weaver (Ploceus dichrocephalus); Black-headed weaver (Ploceus melanocephalus); Golden-backed weaver (Ploceus jacksoni); Cinnamon weaver (Ploceus badius); Chestnut weaver (Ploceus rubiginosus); Golden-naped weaver (Ploceus aureonucha); Yellow-mantled weaver (Ploceus tricolor); Maxwell's black weaver (Ploceus albinucha); Nelicourvi weaver (Ploceus nelicourvi); Sakalava weaver (Ploceus sakalava); Asian golden weaver (Ploceus hypoxanthus); Black-breasted weaver (Ploceus benghalensis); Streaked weaver (Ploceus manyar); Baya weaver (Ploceus philippinus); Finn's weaver (Ploceus megarhynchus); Dark-backed weaver (Ploceus bicolor); Preuss's weaver (Ploceus preussi); Yellow-capped weaver (Ploceus dorsomaculatus); Olive-headed weaver (Ploceus olivaceiceps); Usambara weaver (Ploceus nicolli); Brown-capped weaver (Ploceus insignis); Bar-winged weaver (Ploceus angolensis); São Tomé weaver (Ploceus sanctithomae); Yellow-legged weaver (Ploceus flavipes)
	Pachyphantes Shelley, 1896	Compact weaver (Pachyphantes superciliosus)
	Malimbus Vieillot, 1805	Red-crowned malimbe (Malimbus coronatus); Cassin's malimbe (Malimbus cassini); Rachel's malimbe (Malimbus racheliae); Gola malimbe (Malimbus ballmanni); Red-vented malimbe (Malimbus scutatus); Ibadan malimbe (Malimbus ibadanensis); Blue-billed malimbe (Malimbus nitens); Red-headed malimbe (Malimbus rubricollis); Red-bellied malimbe (Malimbus erythrogaster); Crested malimbe (Malimbus malimbicus)
	Quelea Reichenbach, 1850	Cardinal quelea (Quelea cardinalis); Red-headed quelea (Quelea erythrops); Red-billed quelea (Quelea quelea)
	Anaplectes Reichenbach, 1863	Red-headed weaver (Anaplectes rubriceps); Red weaver (Anaplectes jubaensis)
	Foudia Reichenbach, 1850	Red fody or Madagascar fody (Foudia madagascariensis); Comoros fody or red-headed fody (Foudia eminentissima); Aldabra fody (Foudia aldabrana); Forest fody (Foudia omissa); Mauritius fody (Foudia rubra); Seychelles fody (Foudia sechellarum); Rodrigues fody (Foudia flavicans); Réunion fody (Foudia delloni)
	Brachycope Reichenow, 1900	Bob-tailed weaver (Brachycope anomala)
	Euplectes Swainson, 1829	Yellow-crowned bishop (Euplectes afer); Fire-fronted bishop (Euplectes diadematus); Black bishop (Euplectes gierowii); Black-winged red bishop (Euplectes hordeaceus); Northern red bishop or orange bishop (Euplectes franciscanus); Southern red bishop or red bishop (Euplectes orix); Zanzibar red bishop (Euplectes nigroventris); Golden-backed bishop (Euplectes aureus); Yellow bishop (Euplectes capensis); Fan-tailed widowbird (Euplectes axillaris); Yellow-mantled widowbird (Euplectes macroura); White-winged widowbird (Euplectes albonotatus); Red-collared widowbird (Euplectes ardens); Red-cowled widowbird (Euplectes laticauda); Marsh widowbird (Euplectes hartlaubi); Montane widowbird (Euplectes psammacromius); Long-tailed widowbird (Euplectes progne); Jackson's widowbird (Euplectes jacksoni)

== Description ==
The males of many species in this family are brightly coloured, usually in red or yellow and black. Some species show variation in colour only in the breeding season. These are seed-eating birds with rounded conical bills.

== Distribution and habitat ==
The weaverbird colonies may be found close to bodies of water.

== Behaviour and ecology ==
Weavers are named for their elaborately woven nests. The nests vary in size, shape, material used, and construction techniques from species to species. Materials used for building nests include fine leaf fibers, grass, and twigs. Many species weave very fine nests using thin strands of leaf fiber, though some, like the buffalo-weavers, form massive untidy stick nests in their colonies, which may have spherical woven nests within. The sociable weavers of Africa build apartment-house nests, in which 100 to 300 pairs have separate flask-shaped chambers entered by tubes at the bottom. The sparrow weavers live in family units that employ cooperative breeding. Most species weave nests that have narrow entrances, facing downward.

Many weaver species are gregarious and breed colonially. The birds build their nests together for protection, often several to a branch. Usually, the male birds weave the nests and use them as a form of display to lure prospective females.

== Relationship to humans ==
They sometimes cause crop damage, notably the red-billed quelea, reputed to be the world's most numerous bird.

== Gallery ==
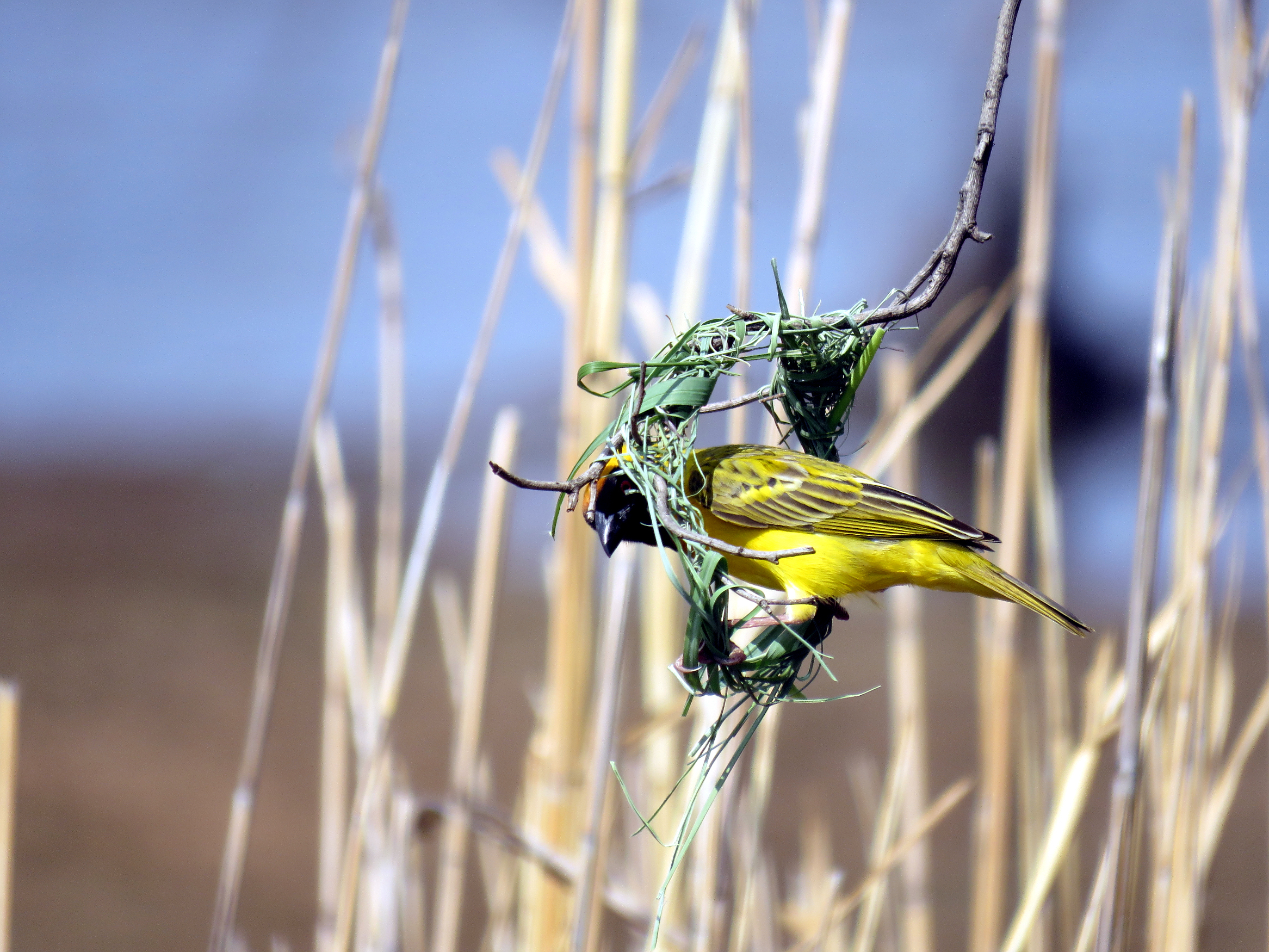
A nest in the early stages of construction

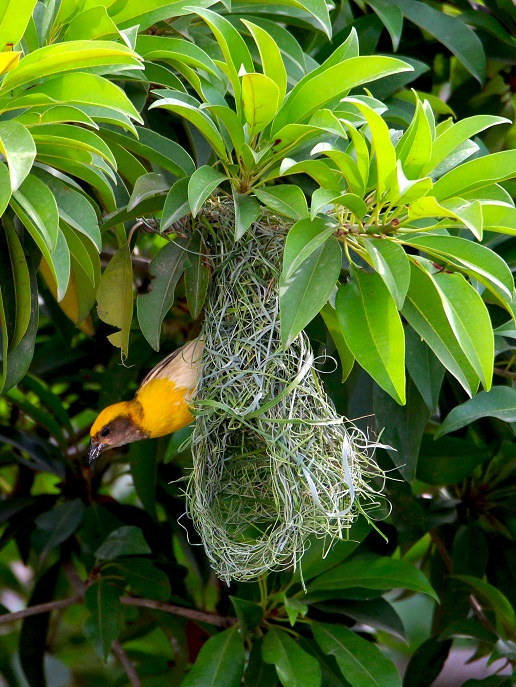
Weaverbirds at West Bengal

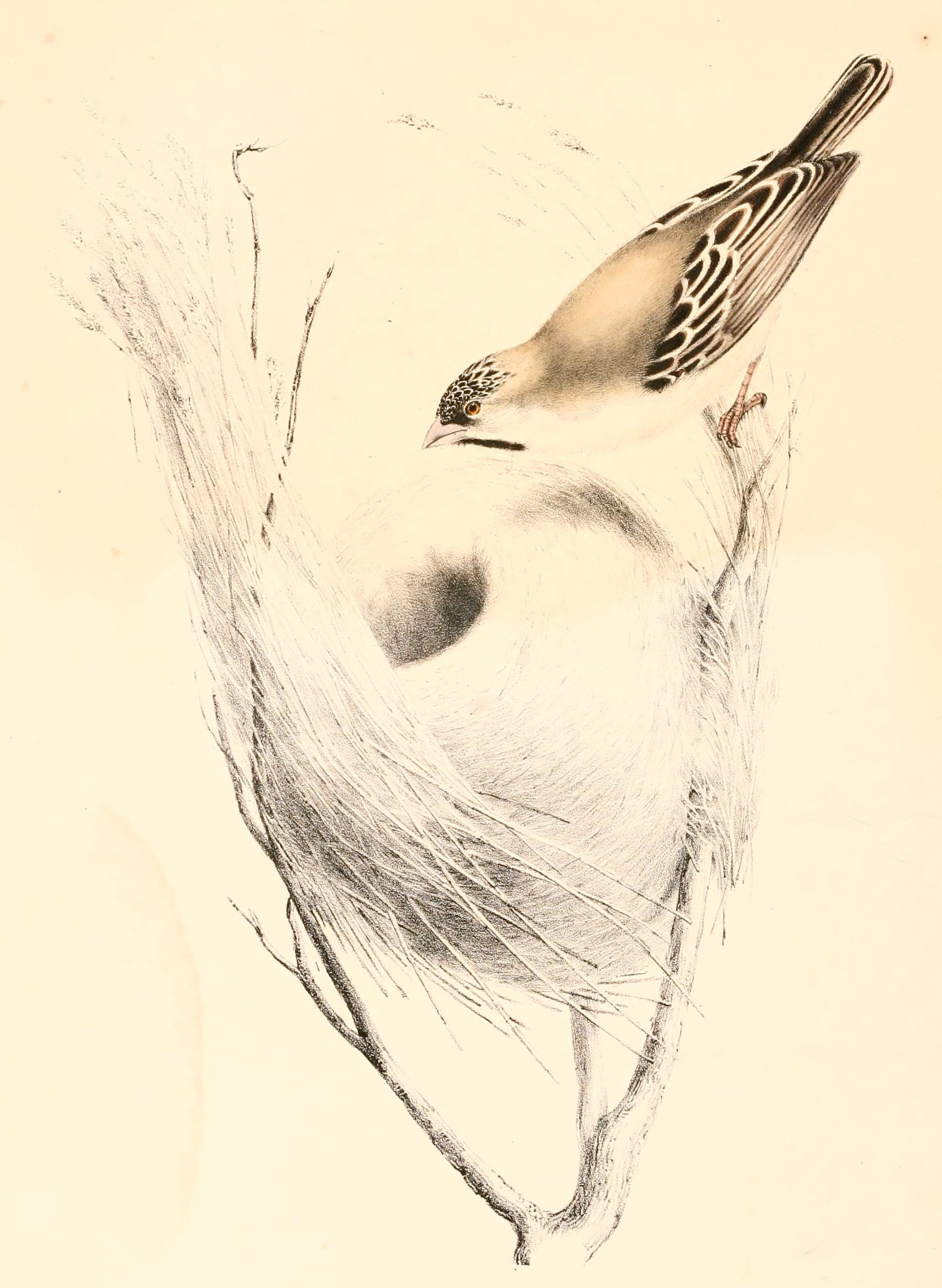
Adult Sporopipes at its spherical grass nest, placed in a shrub

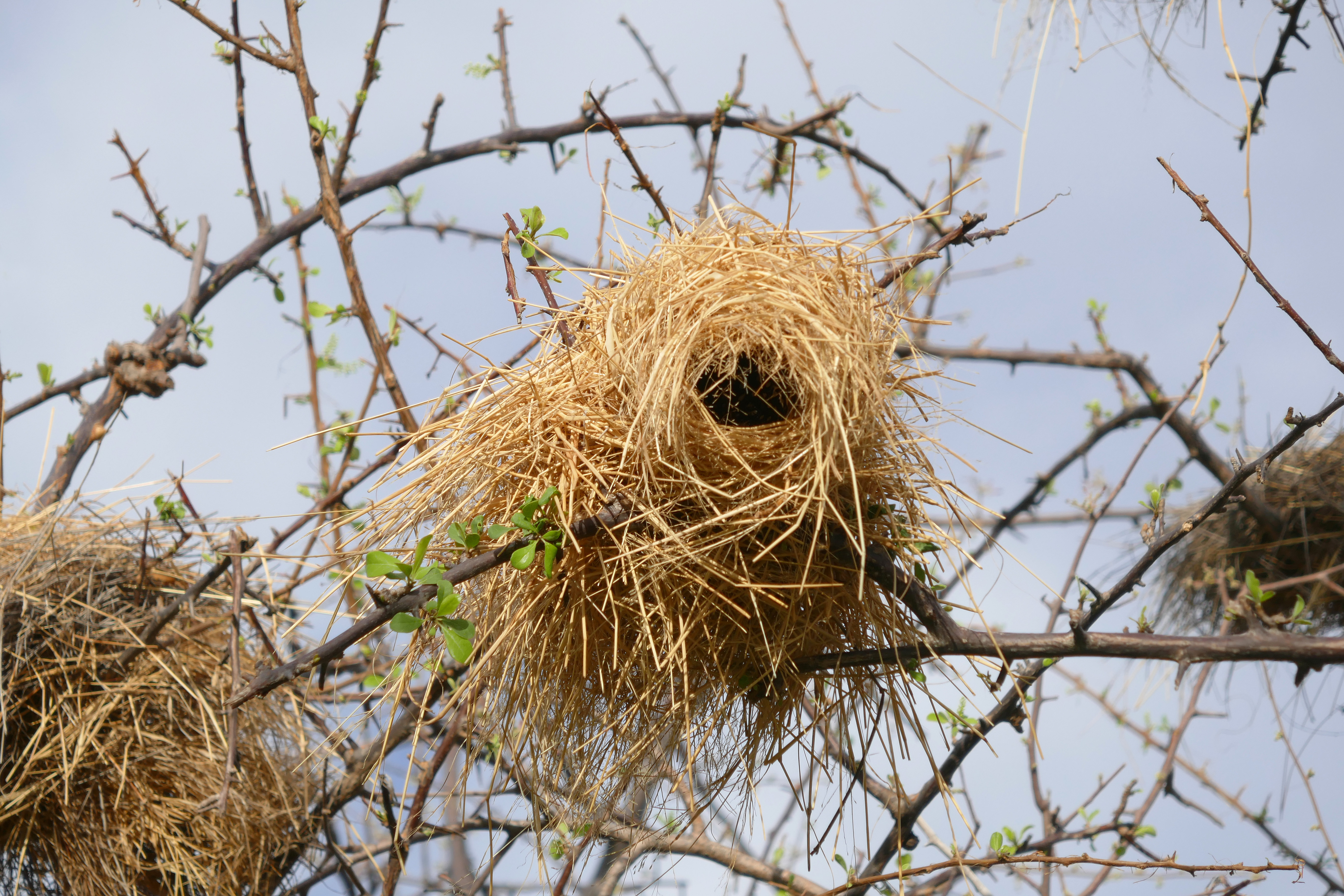
Plocepasser nest in Namibia, for year-round occupation.

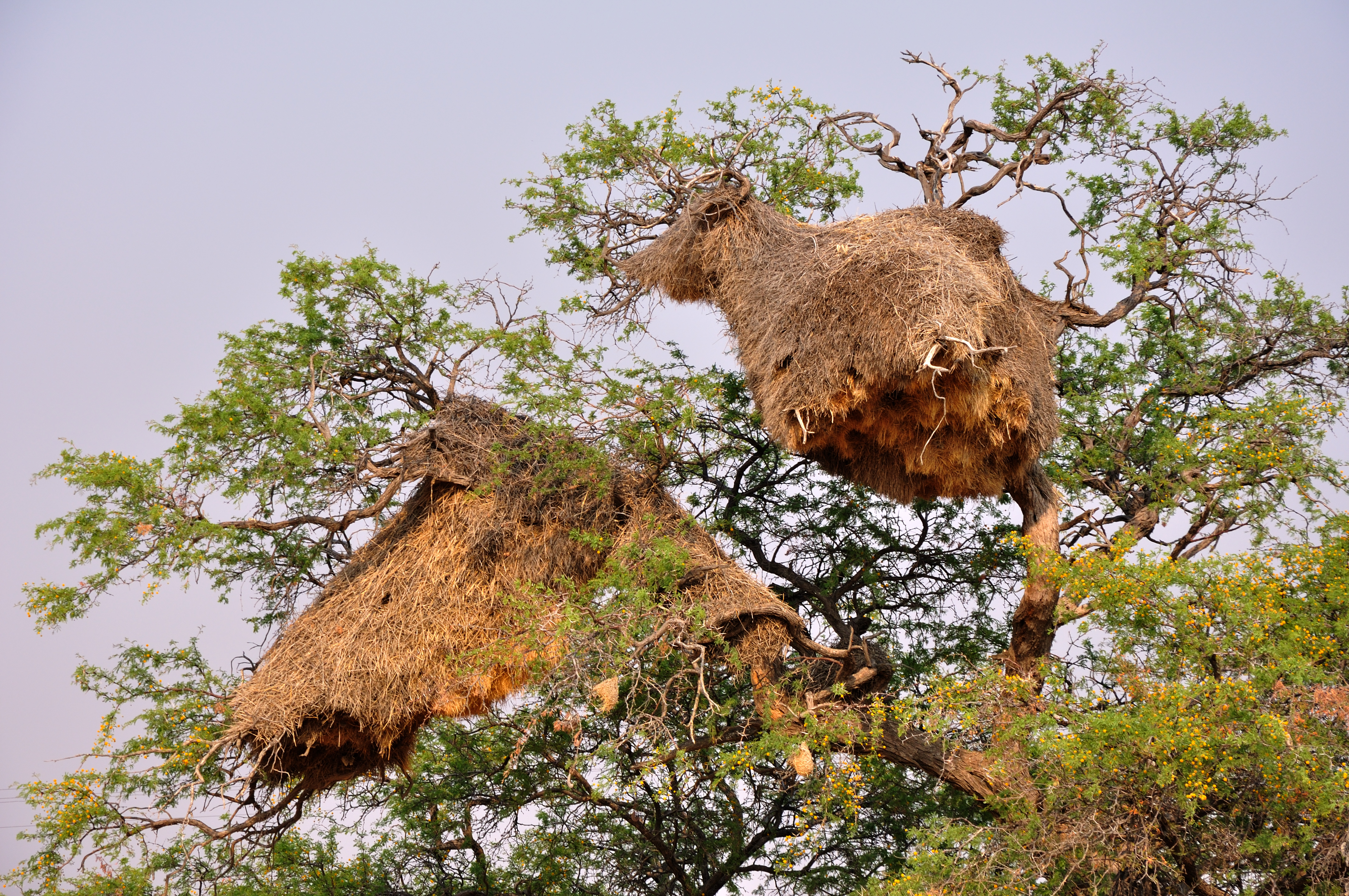
Communal Philetairus nests in central Namibia

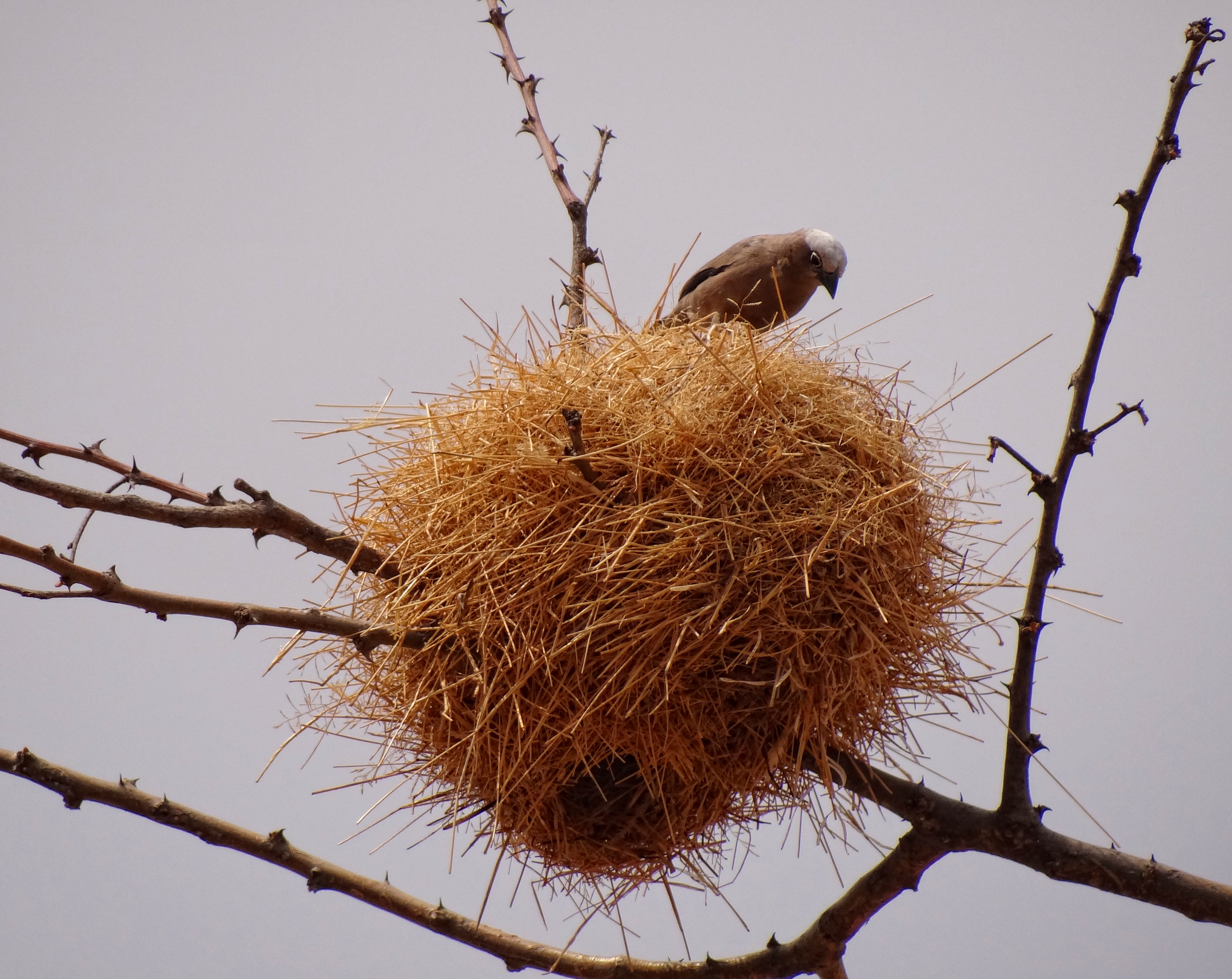
Pseudonigrita nest in Kenya, with entrance below

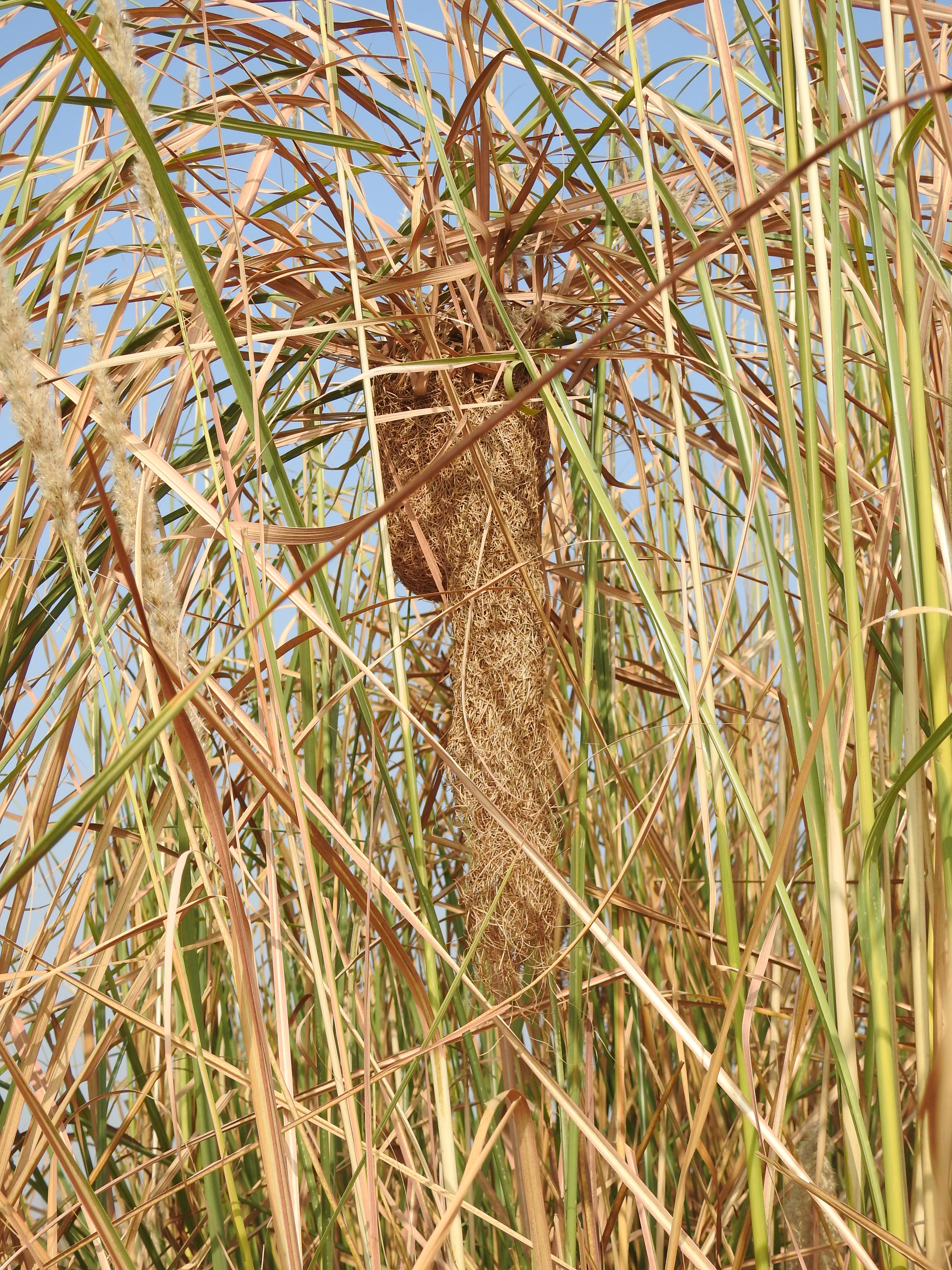
Black-breasted weaver nest suspended from grass, India

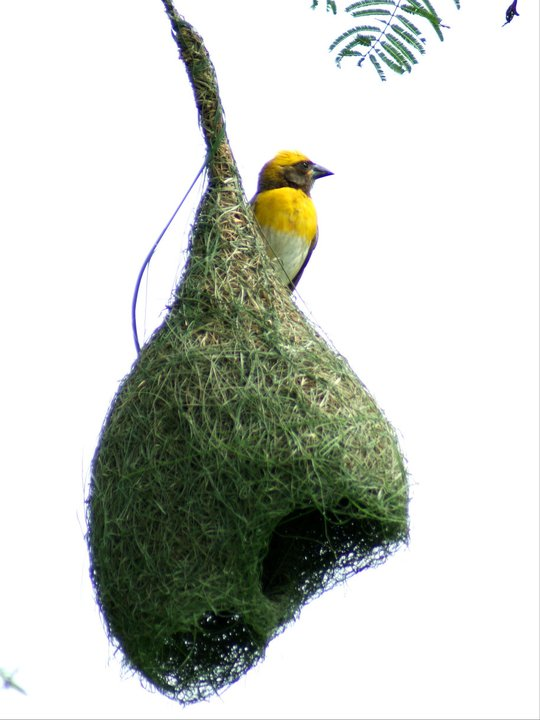
A baya weaver on his unfinished nest, northern India

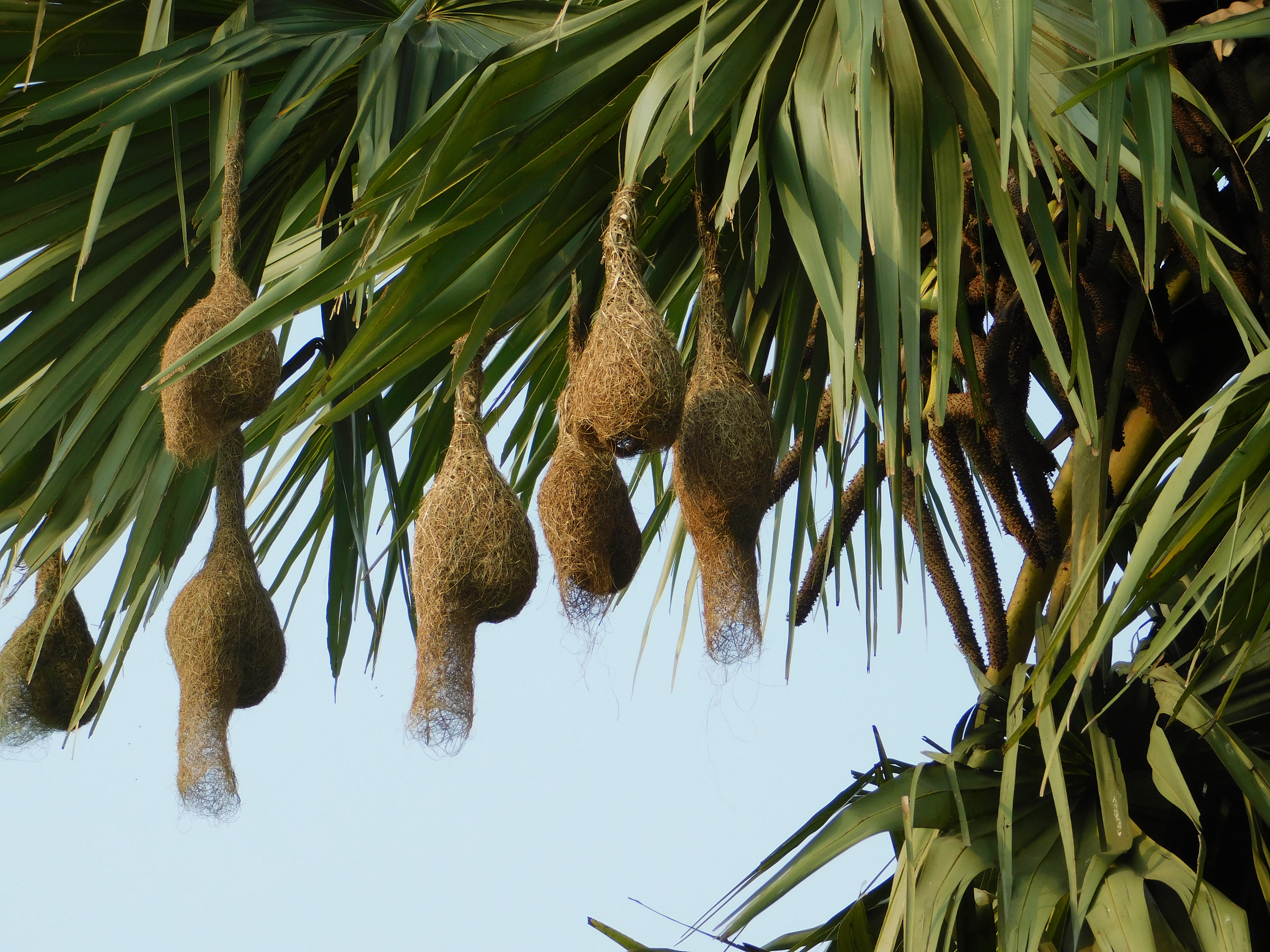
Nests of a baya weaver colony suspended from a palm tree, India

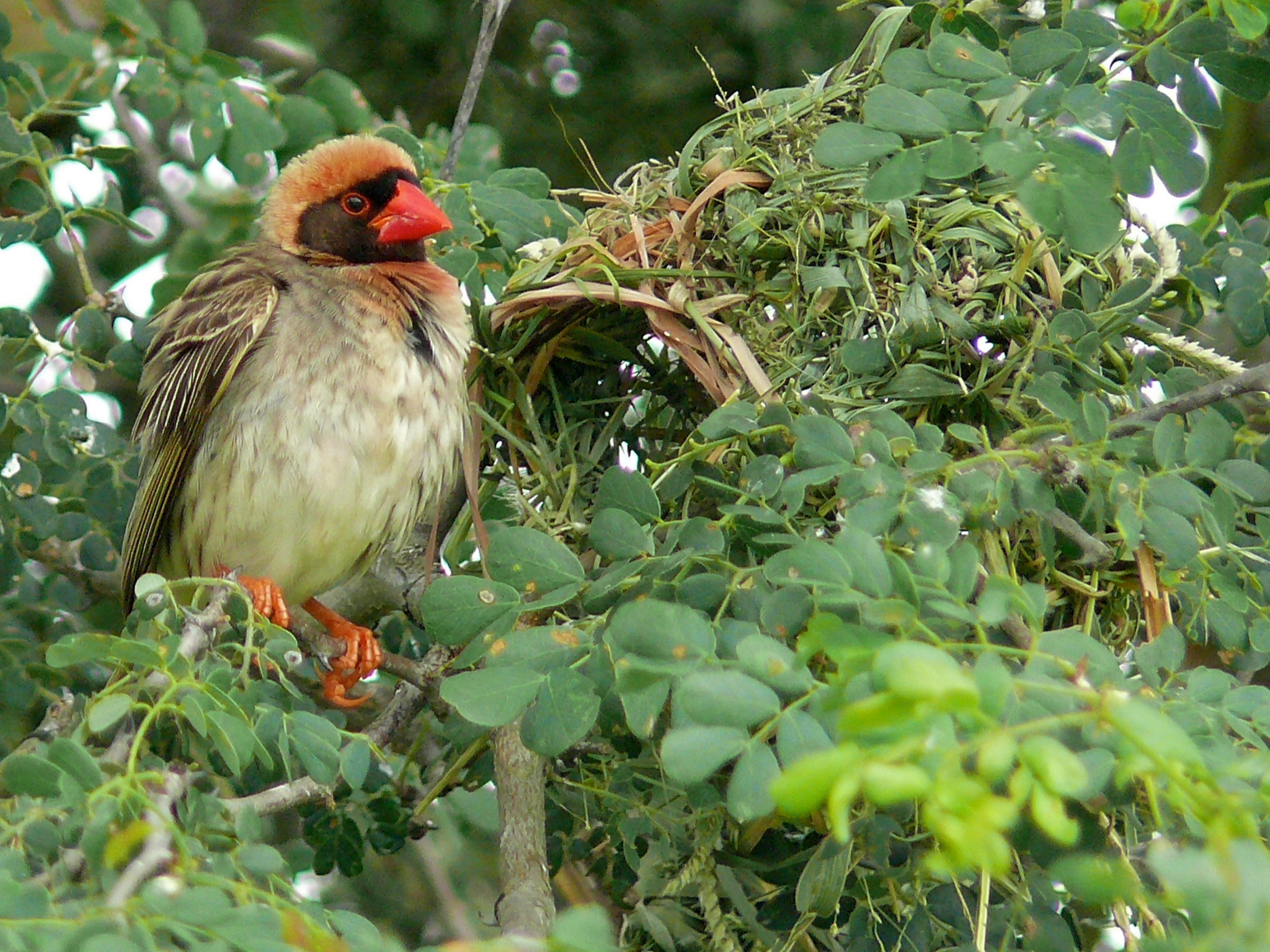
Male Quelea at nest concealed in thorny Senegalia shrub

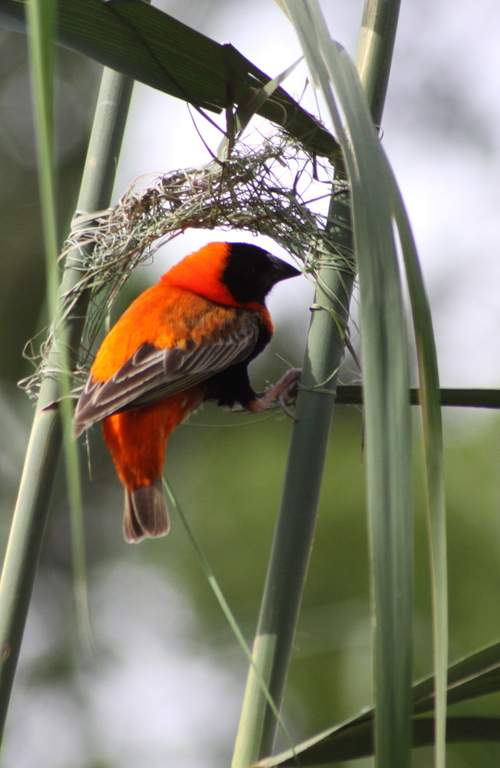
Red bishop constructing a nest in reeds, South Africa

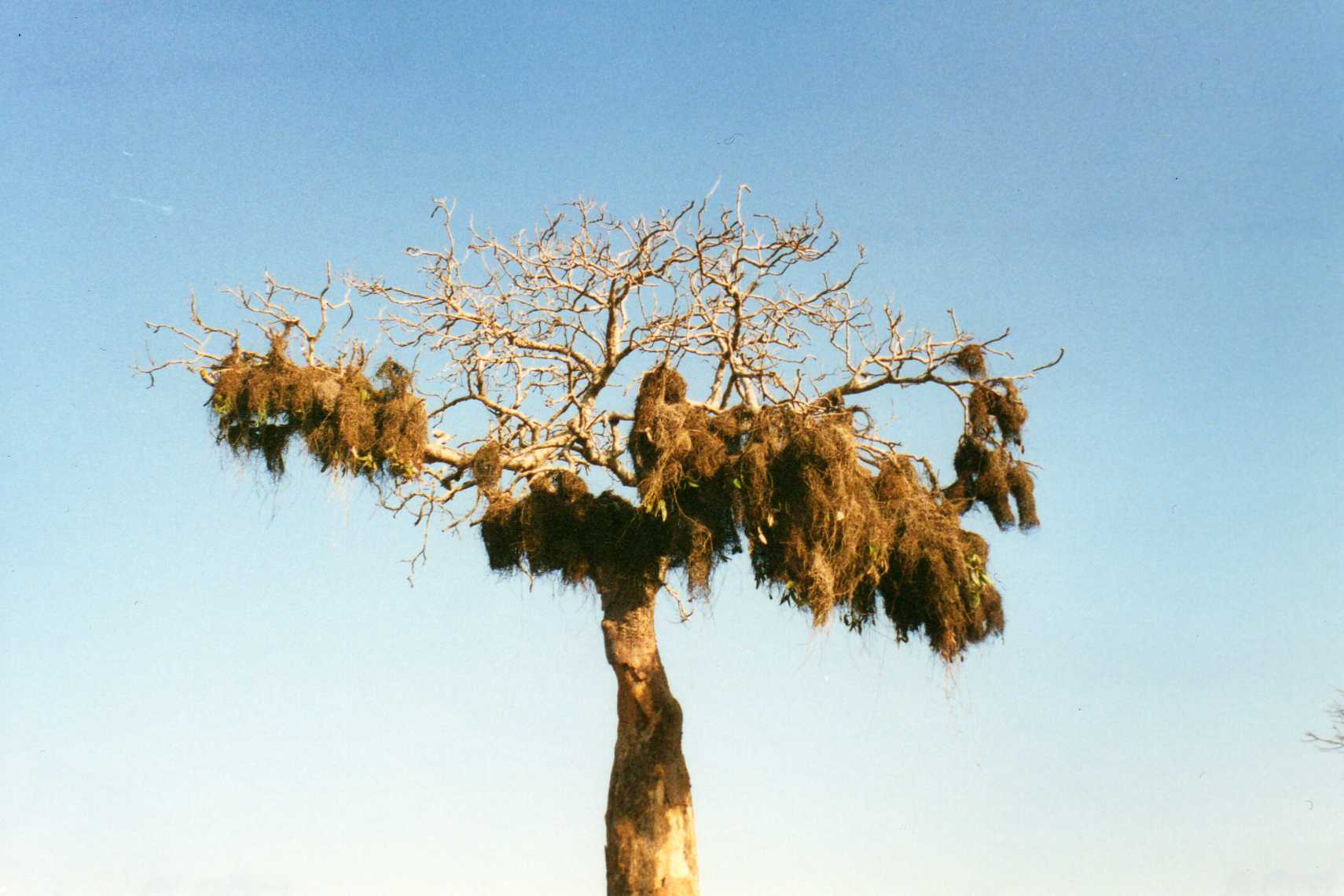
Nests of a colony of Sakalava weavers, Madagascar

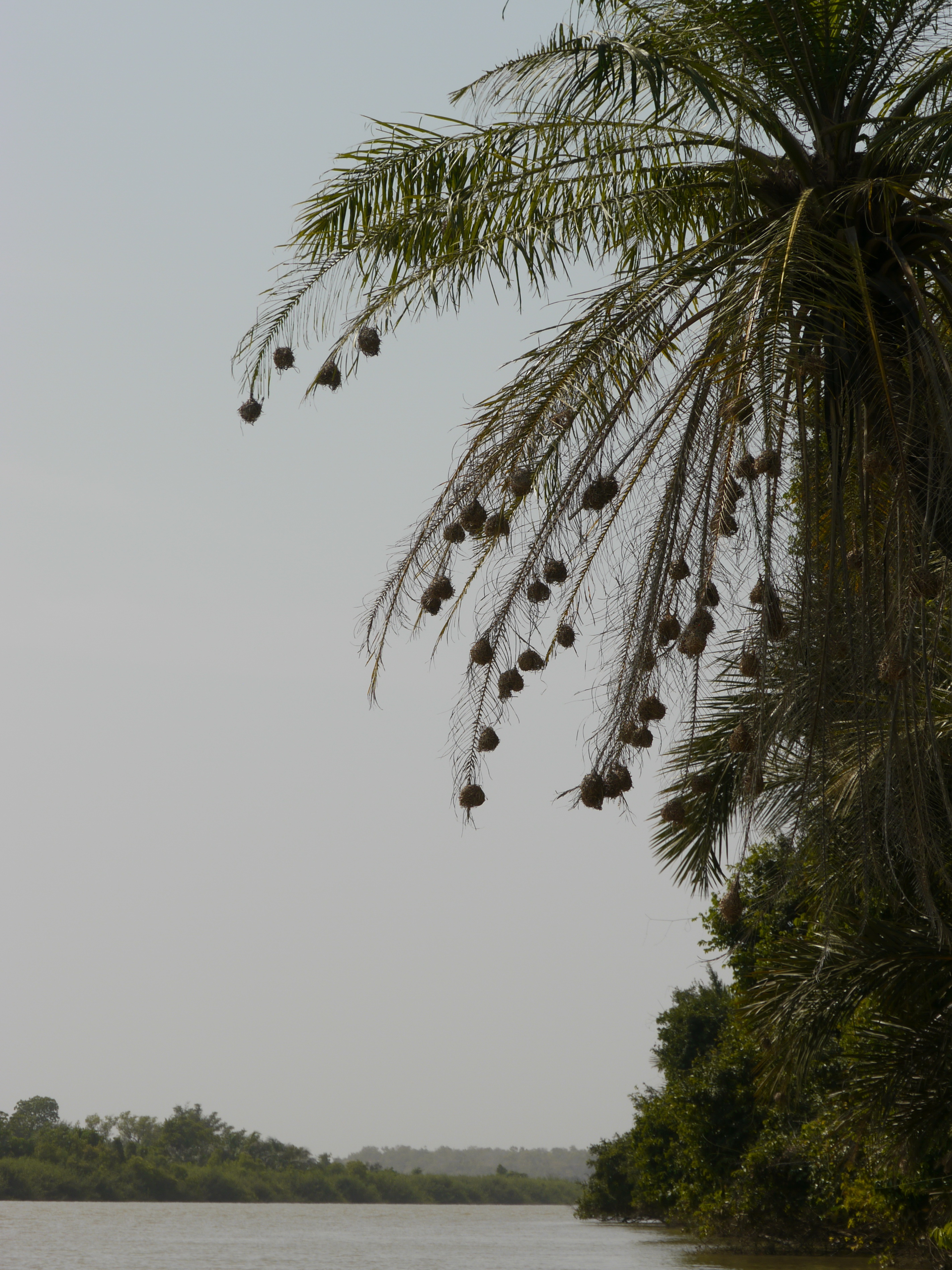
Spherical village weaver nests suspended from a palm tree, West Africa

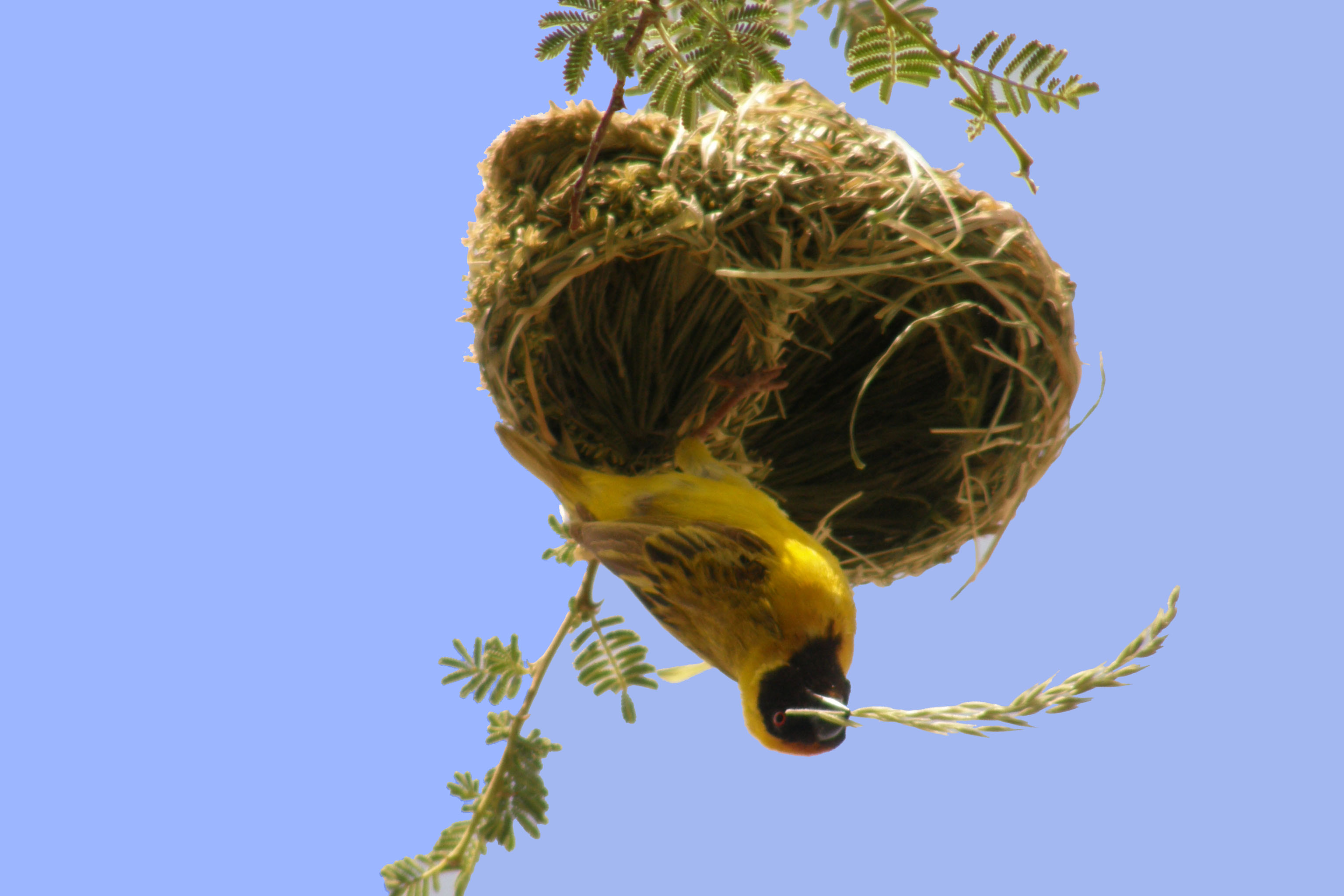
A southern masked weaver building his nest, Namibia

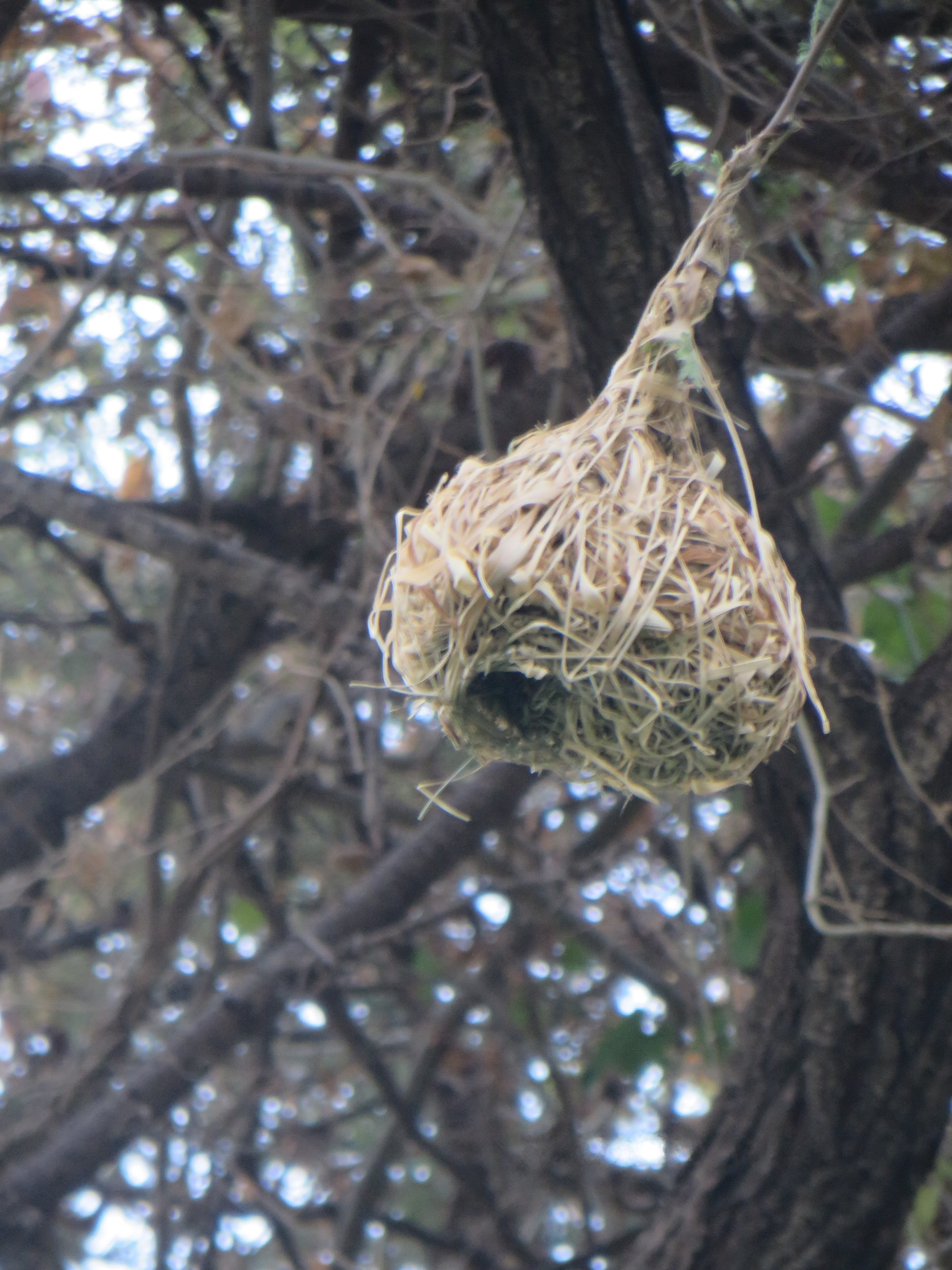
Hanging nest, Hargeysa, Somaliland, July 2019.
