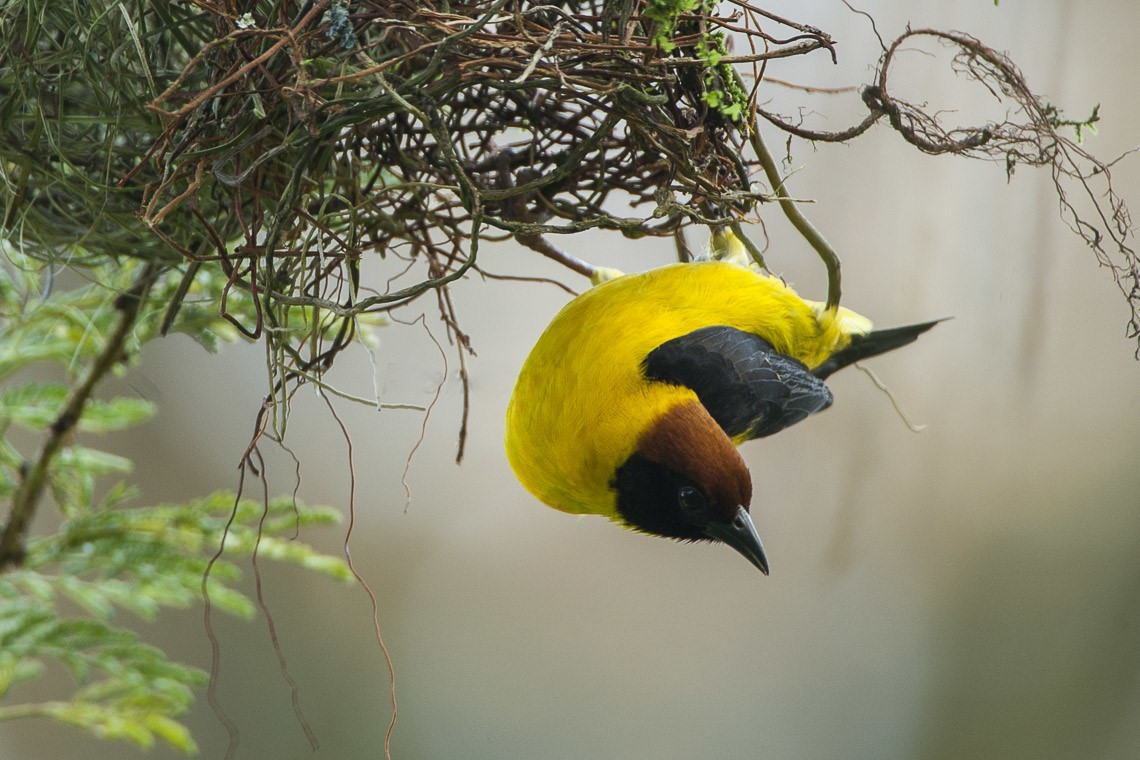

Conservation status
- Least Concern (IUCN 3.1)

Scientific classification
- Kingdom: Animalia
- Phylum: Chordata
- Class: Aves
- Order: Passeriformes
- Family: Ploceidae
- Genus: Ploceus
- Species: P. insignis

Binomial name
- Ploceus insignis (Sharpe, 1891)

= Brown-capped weaver =

Species of bird

The brown-capped weaver (Ploceus insignis) is a species of bird in the family Ploceidae. It is found in Angola, Burundi, Cameroon, Republic of the Congo, Democratic Republic of the Congo, Equatorial Guinea, Kenya, Nigeria, Rwanda, South Sudan, Tanzania, and Uganda.
