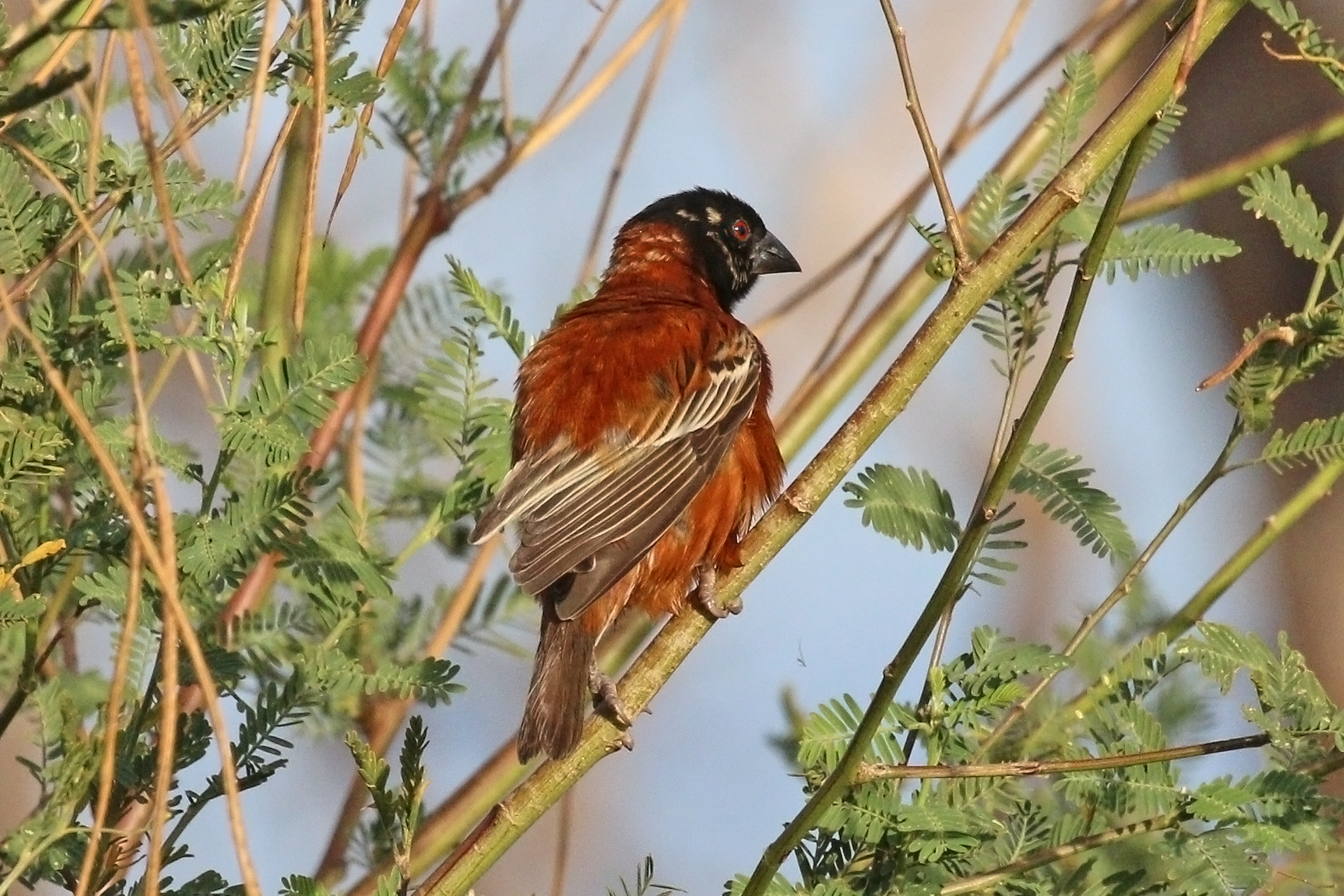

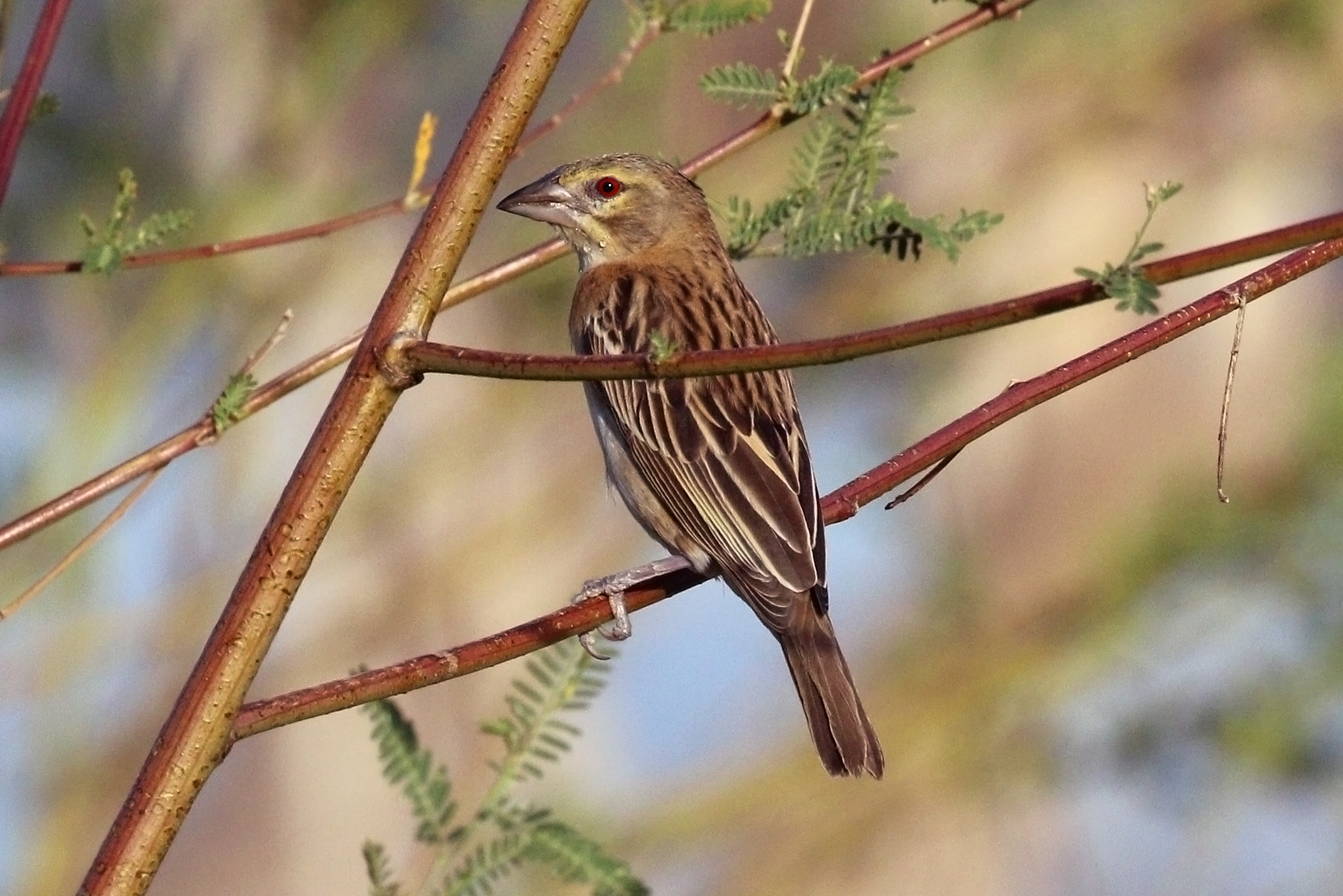
- Male (top) and female (bottom) at Lake Baringo, Kenya

Conservation status
- Least Concern (IUCN 3.1)

Scientific classification
- Kingdom: Animalia
- Phylum: Chordata
- Class: Aves
- Order: Passeriformes
- Family: Ploceidae
- Genus: Ploceus
- Species: P. rubiginosus

Binomial name
- Ploceus rubiginosus Rüppell, 1840

= Chestnut weaver =

Species of bird

The chestnut weaver (Ploceus rubiginosus) is a species of bird in the family Ploceidae. It is found in eastern and south-western Africa. They can typically be found in Kenya, Botswana, Ethiopia, Somalia, Uganda, Tanzania, Angola, and Namibia. Chestnut Weavers are considered locally abundant and of least concern. It is a nomadic as well as residential species that moves in response to rainfall and food availability.

== Distribution and habitat ==
Its general habitat is dry. It can be found in shrubland and thornveld, typically below 1,500 Meters. Colonies of Chestnut Weavers can be found near Nairobi and on the Laikipia Plateau in Kenya, but only when there is good rain, they will also appear further South in Kenya, in Tsavo, from October to April.

== Breeding ==
It is often seen in flocks, which is because they are colonial breeders; many birds nest together in one area. They breed in October in Ethiopia, in May in Somalia, May to July in Uganda, April to July in Kenya, as well as November in the northern arid region, March to April in Tanzania, April in Angola, and December to May in Namibia. Sometimes they will extend their breeding grounds into northwestern Botswana, being found in the Ngamiland District during years of good rain.

== Relationship with humans ==
During their breeding season, they are seen as pests by farmers because they form large colonies and destroy crops. In Kenya, they have been known to destroy Bulrush Millet and are considered a threat to the Millet, Sorghum, and rice grains.

== Description ==
Both the male and female look different from one another. The non-breeding male has dull red eyes, a grayish-brown head, with the rest of his body being an ombre of dark orange to a brighter orange; its wings are covered in black and beige colors, and it has a long brown tail. The female is a pale brown, with yellow coloring around their dark eyes, it has black edges around the feathers of its wings, and a brown tail. The female is also smaller; the male is 28-37 g, and the female is 25-31 g. It has a distinct song, it is a harsh, sizzling sound with occasional high-pitched chirps.

== Feeding and foraging ==
Their diet consists of seeds, grasses, cultivated grains, insects such as termites, and the nectar of aloes. Young chestnut weavers usually only eat insects such as caterpillars, grasshoppers, and crickets. They also forage in small groups, catching insects through the air or foraging on the ground.
