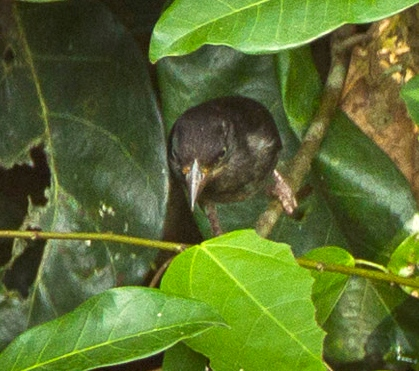

Conservation status
- Least Concern (IUCN 3.1)

Scientific classification
- Kingdom: Animalia
- Phylum: Chordata
- Class: Aves
- Order: Passeriformes
- Family: Ploceidae
- Genus: Ploceus
- Species: P. albinucha

Binomial name
- Ploceus albinucha (Barboza du Bocage, 1876)

= Maxwell's black weaver =

Species of bird

Maxwell's black weaver (Ploceus albinucha) is a species of bird in the family Ploceidae.

== Range ==
It is sparsely distributed across the African tropical rainforest.
