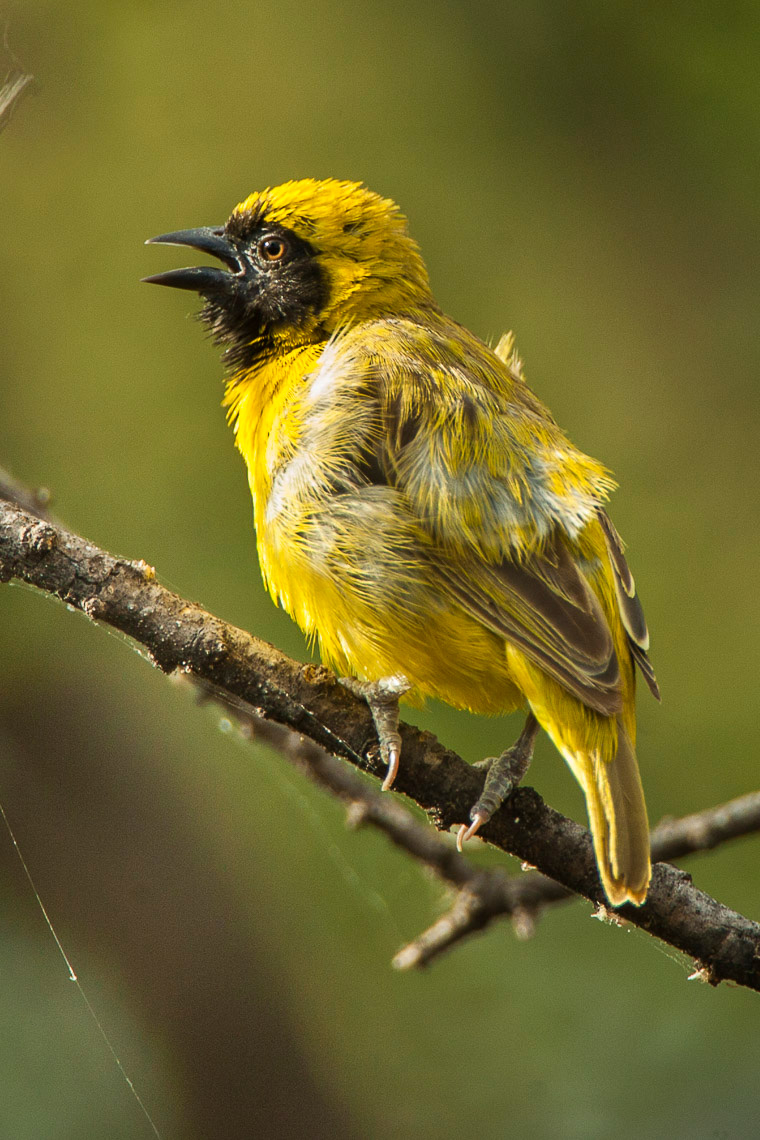

Conservation status
- Least Concern (IUCN 3.1)

Scientific classification
- Kingdom: Animalia
- Phylum: Chordata
- Class: Aves
- Order: Passeriformes
- Family: Ploceidae
- Genus: Ploceus
- Species: P. luteolus

Binomial name
- Ploceus luteolus (Lichtenstein, MHC, 1823)

= Little weaver =

Species of bird

The little weaver (Ploceus luteolus) is a species of bird in the family Ploceidae. It is found in western, central and eastern Africa.
