= List of birds of Uganda =

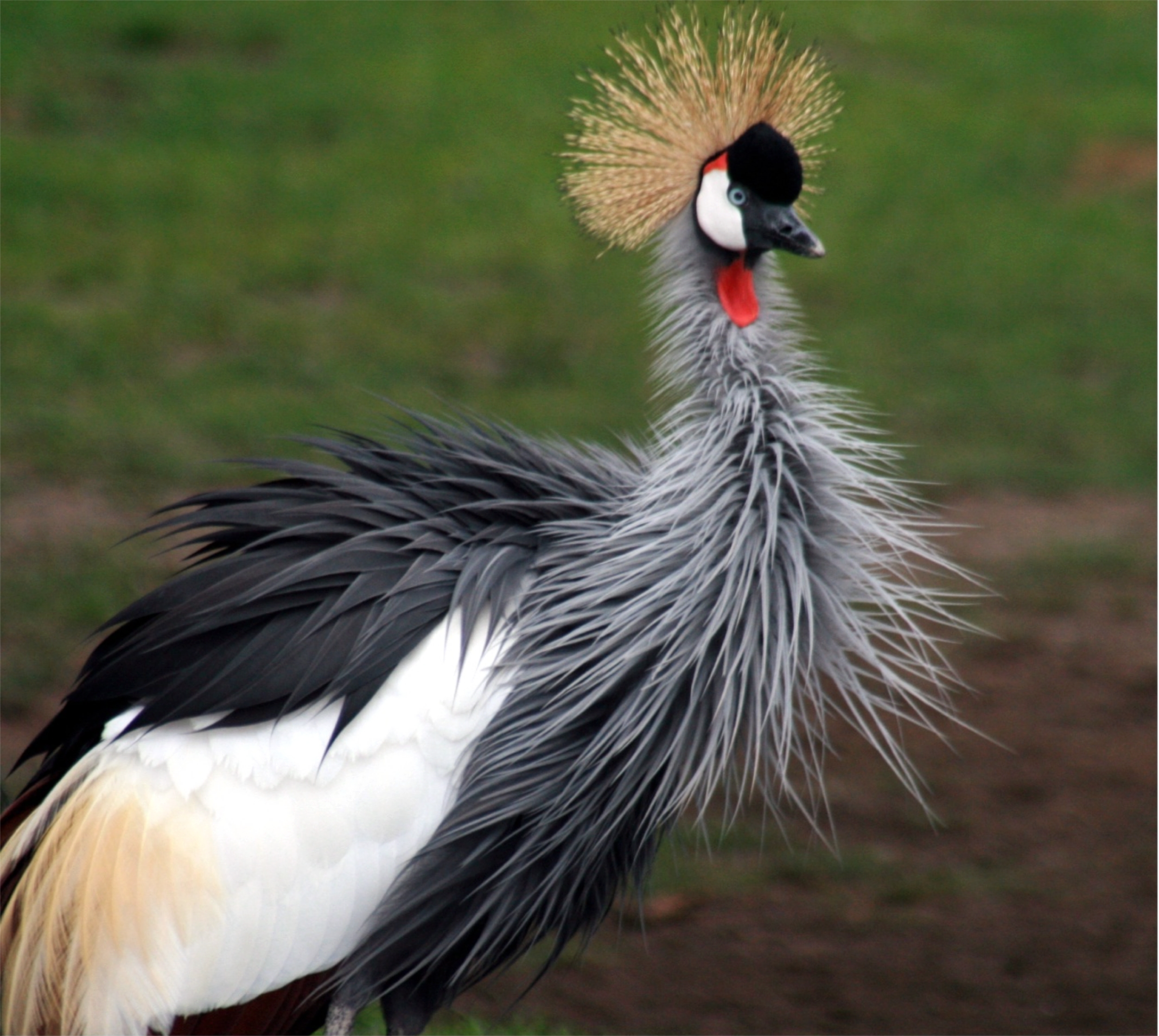
The gray crowned-crane is the national bird of Uganda

This is a list of the bird species recorded in Uganda. The avifauna of Uganda included a total of 1088 confirmed species as of February 2023. Of them, one is endemic, and three have been introduced by humans. Three additional species are hypothetical as defined below and are not included in the counts. Unless otherwise noted, the list is that of Avibase.

This list's taxonomic treatment (designation and sequence of orders, families and species) and nomenclature (English and scientific names) are those of The Clements Checklist of Birds of the World, 2022 edition.

The following tags highlight several categories of occurrence other than regular migrants and residents.

- (A) Accidental - a species that rarely or accidentally occurs in Uganda (also called a vagrant)
- (E) Endemic - a species endemic to Uganda
- (I) Introduced - a species introduced to Uganda as a consequence, direct or indirect, of human actions
- (H) Hypothetical - a species possibly present but which has not been documented

== Ostriches ==
Order: Struthioniformes Family: Struthionidae

Ostriches are flightless birds native to Africa, and the largest living species of bird. They are distinctive in appearance, with a long neck and legs and the ability to run at high speeds.

- Common ostrich, Struthio camelus

== Ducks, geese, and waterfowl ==
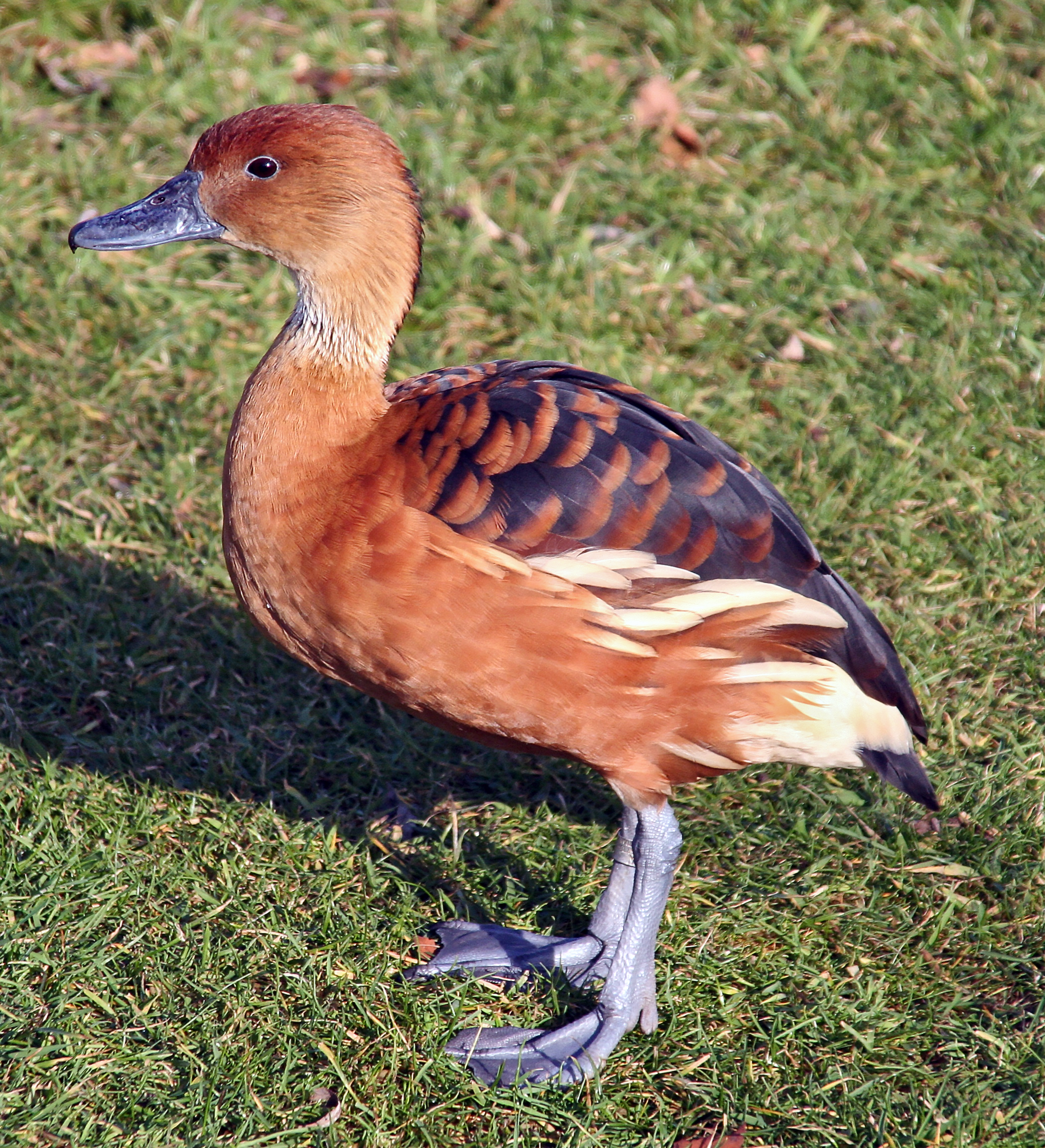
Fulvous whistling-duck

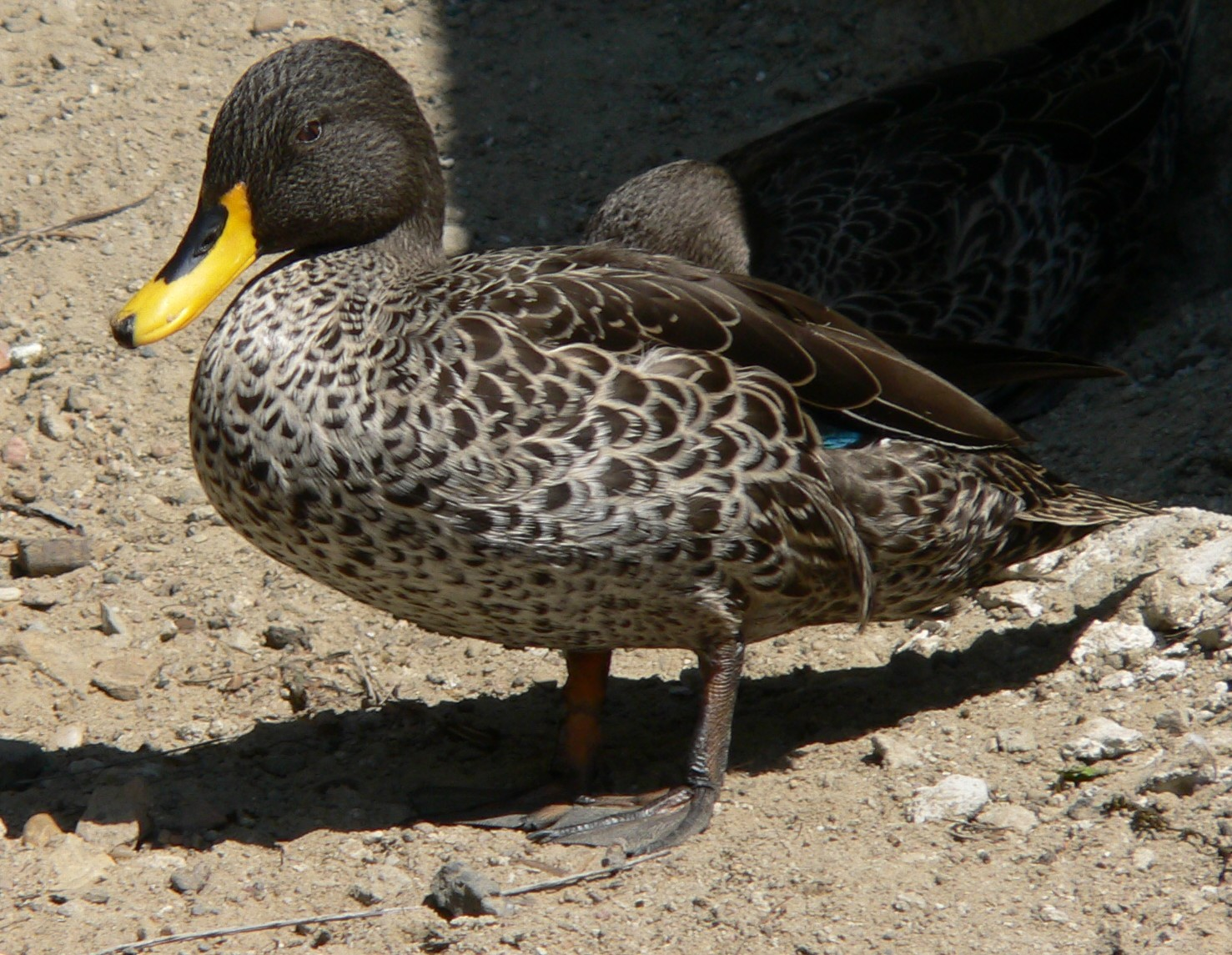
Yellow-billed duck

Order: Anseriformes Family: Anatidae

Anatidae includes the ducks and most duck-like waterfowl, such as geese and swans. These birds are adapted to an aquatic existence with webbed feet, flattened bills, and feathers that are excellent at shedding water due to an oily coating.

- White-faced whistling-duck, Dendrocygna viduata
- Fulvous whistling-duck, Dendrocygna bicolor
- White-backed duck, Thalassornis leuconotus
- Knob-billed duck, Sarkidiornis melanotos
- Hartlaub's duck, Pteronetta hartlaubii (A)
- Egyptian goose, Alopochen aegyptiacus
- Spur-winged goose, Plectropterus gambensis
- African pygmy-goose, Nettapus auritus
- Garganey, Spatula querquedula
- Blue-billed teal, Spatula hottentota
- Northern shoveler, Spatula clypeata
- Eurasian wigeon, Mareca penelope (A)
- African black duck, Anas sparsa
- Yellow-billed duck, Anas undulata
- Red-billed duck, Anas erythrorhyncha
- Northern pintail, Anas acuta
- Green-winged teal, Anas crecca
- Southern pochard, Netta erythrophthalma
- Common pochard, Aythya ferina
- Ferruginous duck, Aythya nyroca (A)
- Tufted duck, Aythya fuligula
- Maccoa duck, Oxyura maccoa (A)

== Guineafowl ==
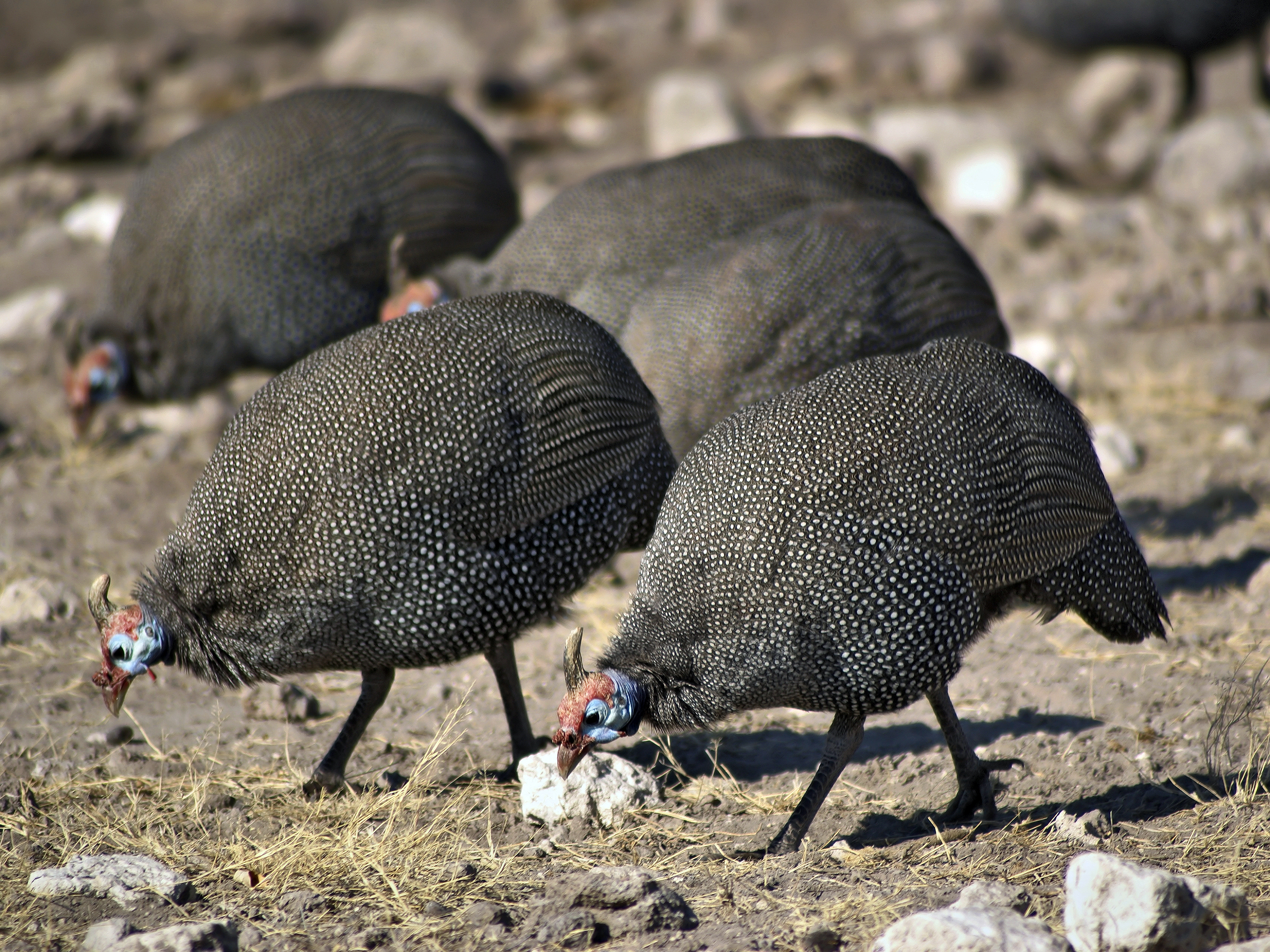
Helmeted guineafowl

Order: Galliformes Family: Numididae

Guineafowl are a group of African, seed-eating, ground-nesting birds that resemble partridges, but with featherless heads and spangled grey plumage.

- Helmeted guineafowl, Numida meleagris
- Western crested guineafowl, Guttera verreauxi

== New World quail ==
Order: Galliformes Family: Odontophoridae

Despite their family's common name, these two species are native to Africa.

- Stone partridge, Ptilopachus petrosus
- Nahan's francolin, Ptilopachus nahani

== Pheasants, grouse, and allies ==
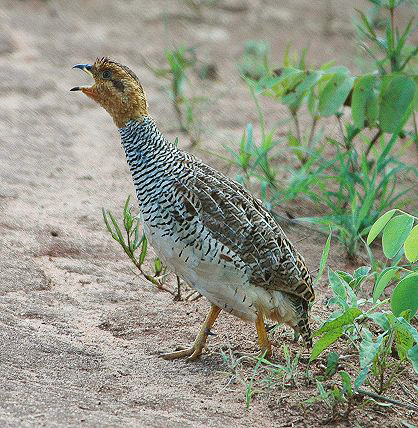
Coqui francolin

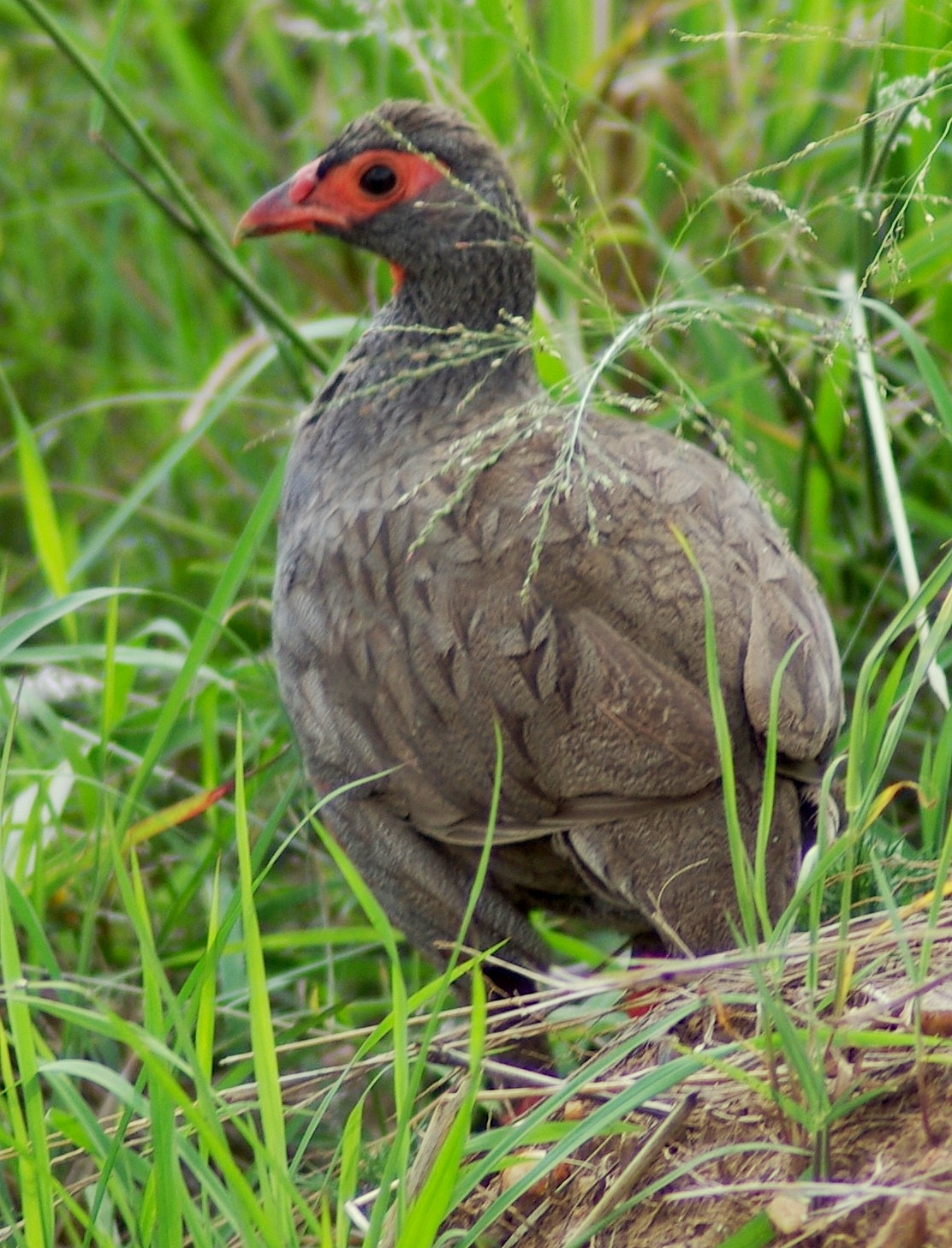
Red-necked francolin

Order: Galliformes Family: Phasianidae

The Phasianidae are a family of terrestrial birds which consists of quails, snowcocks, francolins, spurfowls, tragopans, monals, pheasants, peafowls, and jungle fowls. In general, they are plump (although they vary in size) and have broad, relatively short wings.

- Latham's francolin, Peliperdix lathami
- Crested francolin, Ortygornis sephaena
- Coqui francolin, Campocolinus coqui
- Ring-necked francolin, Scleroptila streptophorus
- Red-winged francolin, Scleroptila levaillantii
- Elgon francolin, Scleroptila elgonensis
- Orange River francolin, Scleroptila gutturalis
- Shelley's francolin, Scleroptila shelleyi
- Blue quail, Synoicus adansonii
- Common quail, Coturnix coturnix
- Harlequin quail, Coturnix delegorguei
- Handsome francolin, Pternistis nobilis
- Jackson's francolin, Pternistis jacksoni (A)
- Hildebrandt's francolin, Pternistis hildebrandti
- Scaly francolin, Pternistis squamatus
- Heuglin's francolin, Pternistis icterorhynchus
- Clapperton's francolin, Pternistis clappertoni
- Yellow-necked francolin, Pternistis leucoscepus
- Red-necked francolin, Pternistis afer

== Flamingos ==
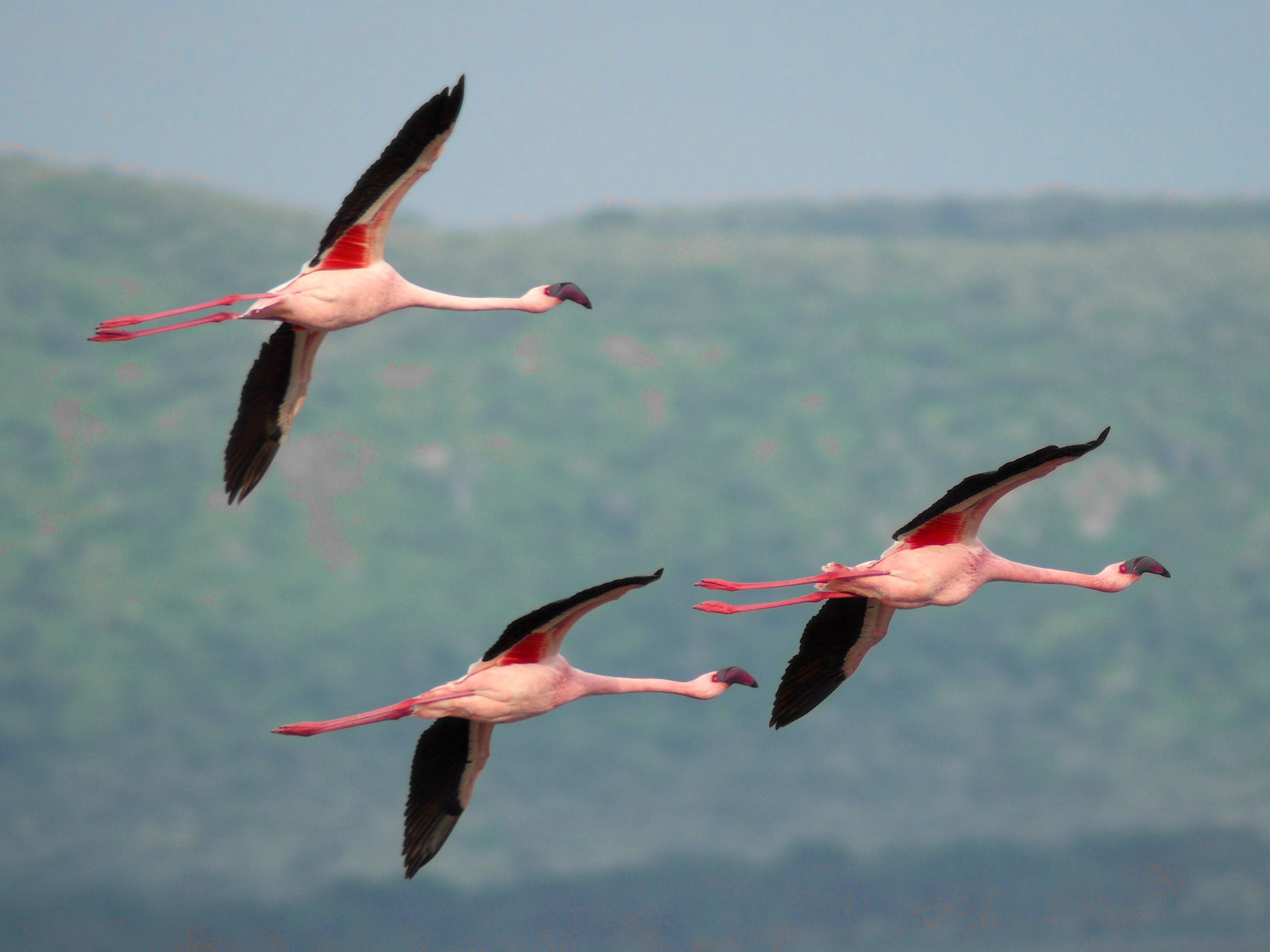
Lesser flamingos

Order: Phoenicopteriformes Family: Phoenicopteridae

Flamingos are gregarious wading birds, usually 3 to 5 feet (0.9 to 1.5 m) tall, found in both the Western and Eastern Hemispheres. Flamingos filter-feed on shellfish and algae. Their oddly shaped beaks are specially adapted to separate mud and silt from the food they consume and, uniquely, are used upside-down.

- Greater flamingo, Phoenicopterus roseus
- Lesser flamingo, Phoeniconaias minor

== Grebes ==
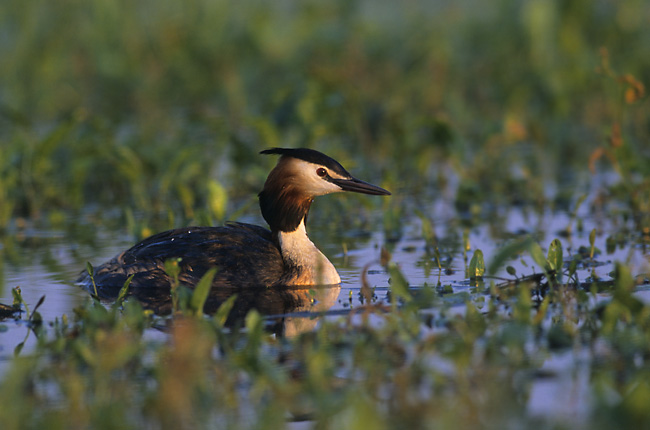
Great crested grebe

Order: Podicipediformes Family: Podicipedidae

Grebes are small to medium-large freshwater diving birds. They have lobed toes and are excellent swimmers and divers. However, they have their feet placed far back on the body, making them quite ungainly on land.

- Little grebe, Tachybaptus ruficollis
- Great crested grebe, Podiceps cristatus
- Eared grebe, Podiceps nigricollis (A)

== Pigeons and doves ==
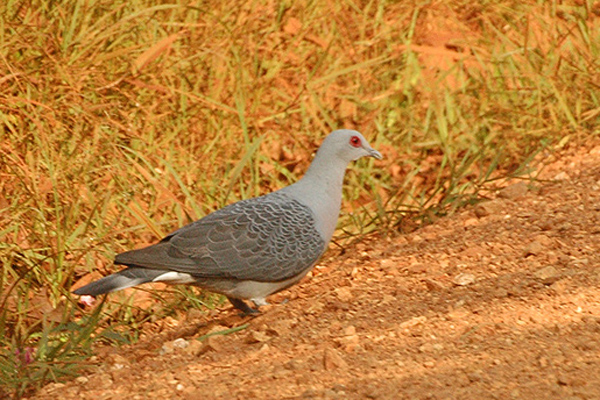
Afep pigeon

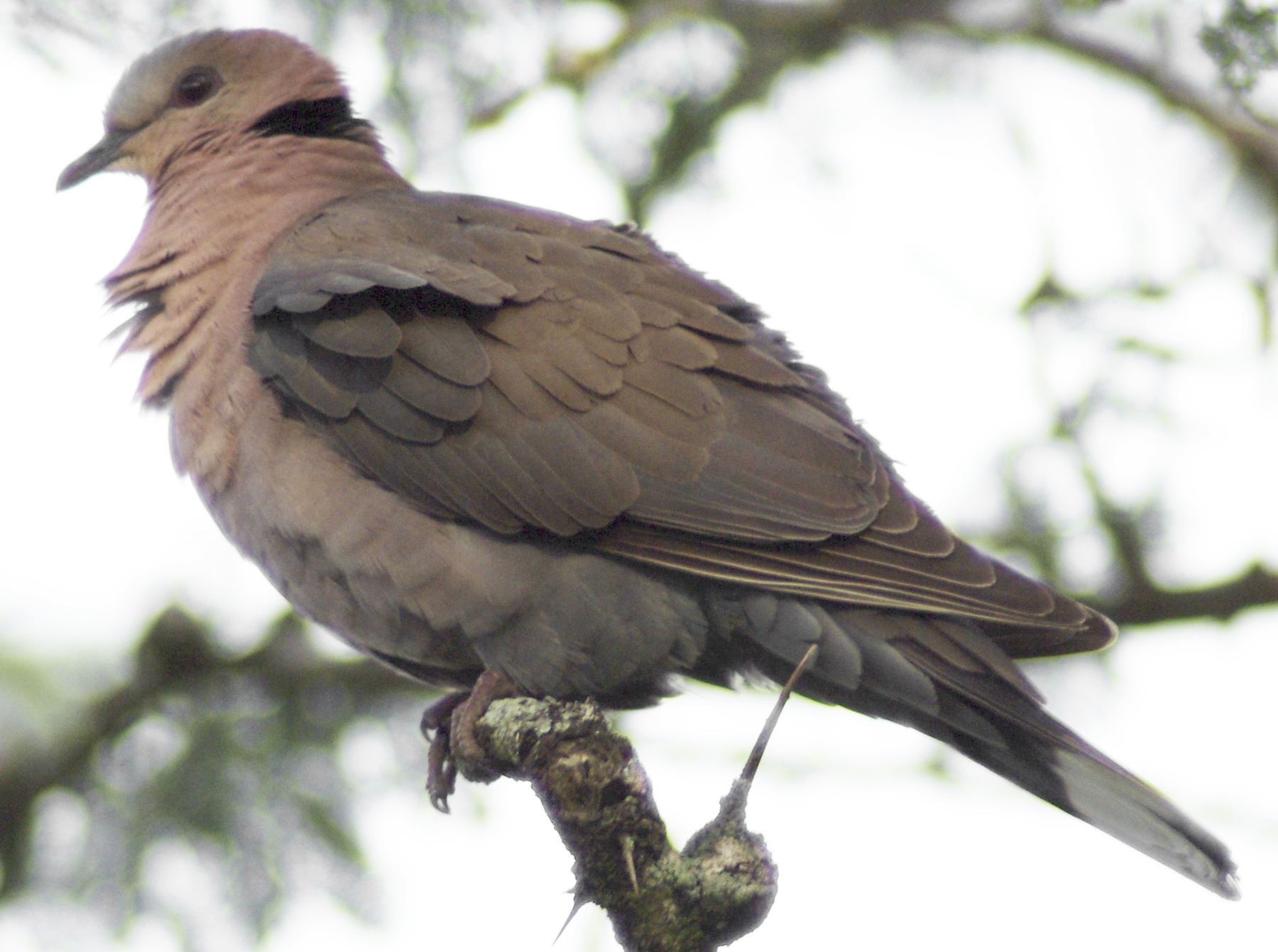
Red-eyed dove

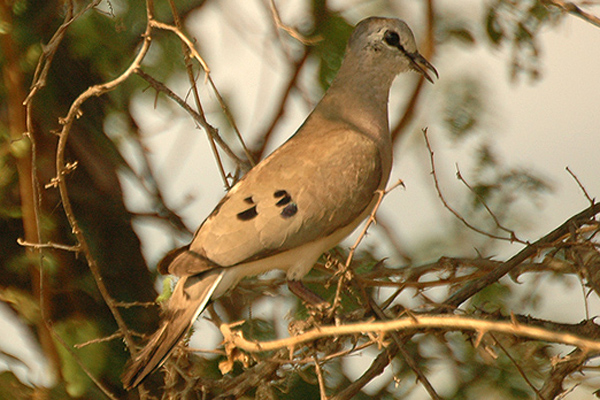
Black-billed wood-dove

Order: Columbiformes Family: Columbidae

Pigeons and doves are stout-bodied birds with short necks and short slender bills with a fleshy cere.

- Rock pigeon, Columba livia (I)
- Speckled pigeon, Columba guinea
- Afep pigeon, Columba unicincta
- Rameron pigeon, Columba arquatrix
- Delegorgue's pigeon, Columba delegorguei
- Bronze-naped pigeon, Columba iriditorques
- Lemon dove, Columba larvata
- White-naped pigeon, Columba albinucha
- European turtle-dove, Streptopelia turtur
- Dusky turtle-dove, Streptopelia lugens
- Mourning collared-dove, Streptopelia decipiens
- Red-eyed dove, Streptopelia semitorquata
- Ring-necked dove, Streptopelia capicola
- Vinaceous dove, Streptopelia vinacea
- Laughing dove, Streptopelia senegalensis
- Emerald-spotted wood-dove, Turtur chalcospilos
- Black-billed wood-dove, Turtur abyssinicus
- Blue-spotted wood-dove, Turtur afer
- Tambourine dove, Turtur tympanistria
- Namaqua dove, Oena capensis
- Bruce's green-pigeon, Treron waalia
- African green-pigeon, Treron calvus

== Sandgrouse ==
Order: Pterocliformes Family: Pteroclidae

Sandgrouse have small, pigeon-like heads and necks, but sturdy compact bodies. They have long pointed wings and sometimes tails and a fast direct flight. Flocks fly to watering holes at dawn and dusk. Their legs are feathered down to the toes.

- Lichtenstein's sandgrouse, Pterocles lichtensteinii (A)
- Four-banded sandgrouse, Pterocles quadricinctus

== Bustards ==
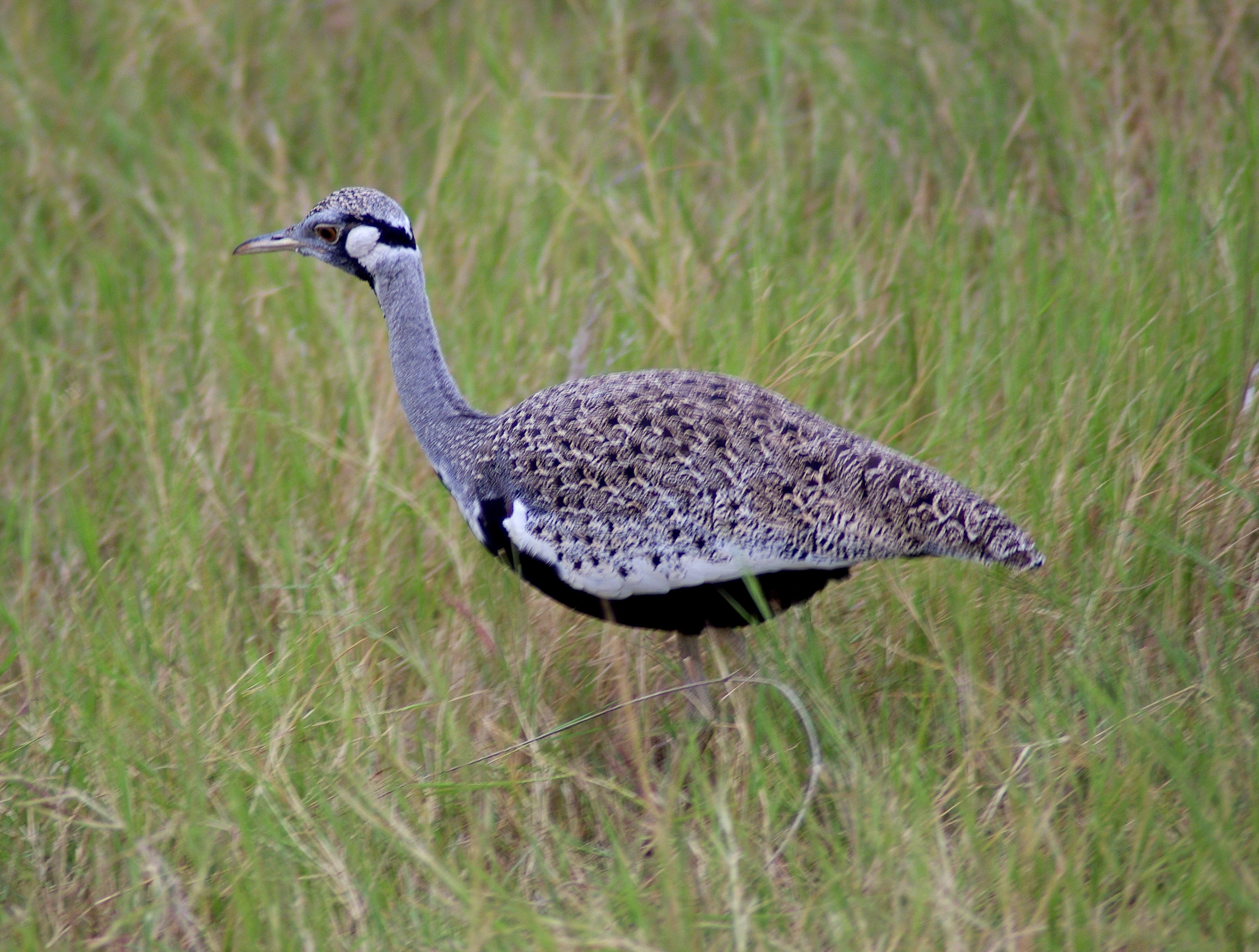
Hartlaub's bustard

Order: Otidiformes Family: Otididae

Bustards are large terrestrial birds mainly associated with dry open country and steppes in the Old World. They are omnivorous and nest on the ground. They walk steadily on strong legs and big toes, pecking for food as they go. They have long broad wings with "fingered" wingtips and striking patterns in flight. Many have interesting mating displays.

- Kori bustard, Ardeotis kori
- Denham's bustard, Neotis denhami
- White-bellied bustard, Eupodotis senegalensis
- Buff-crested bustard, Lophotis gindiana
- Black-bellied bustard, Lissotis melanogaster
- Hartlaub's bustard, Lissotis hartlaubii

== Turacos ==
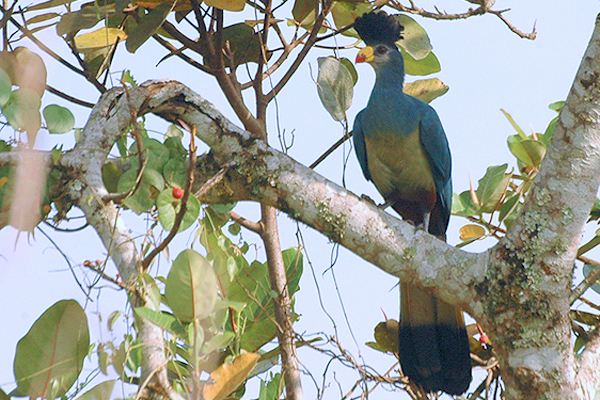
Great blue turaco at Bigodi Swamp, W. Uganda

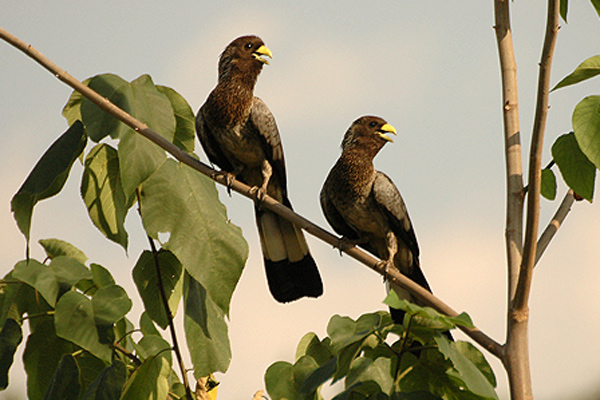
Eastern plantain-eater

Order: Musophagiformes Family: Musophagidae

The turacos, plantain-eaters, and go-away-birds make up the bird family Musophagidae. They are medium-sized arboreal birds. The turacos and plantain-eaters are brightly coloured, usually in blue, green, or purple. The go-away-birds are mostly grey and white.

- Great blue turaco, Corythaeola cristata
- Black-billed turaco, Tauraco schuettii
- White-crested turaco, Tauraco leucolophus
- Hartlaub's turaco, Tauraco hartlaubi
- Purple-crested turaco, Tauraco porphyreolophus
- Rwenzori turaco, Ruwenzorornis johnstoni
- Ross's turaco, Musophaga rossae
- Bare-faced go-away-bird, Corythaixoides personatus
- White-bellied go-away-bird, Corythaixoides leucogaster
- Eastern plantain-eater, Crinifer zonurus

== Cuckoos ==
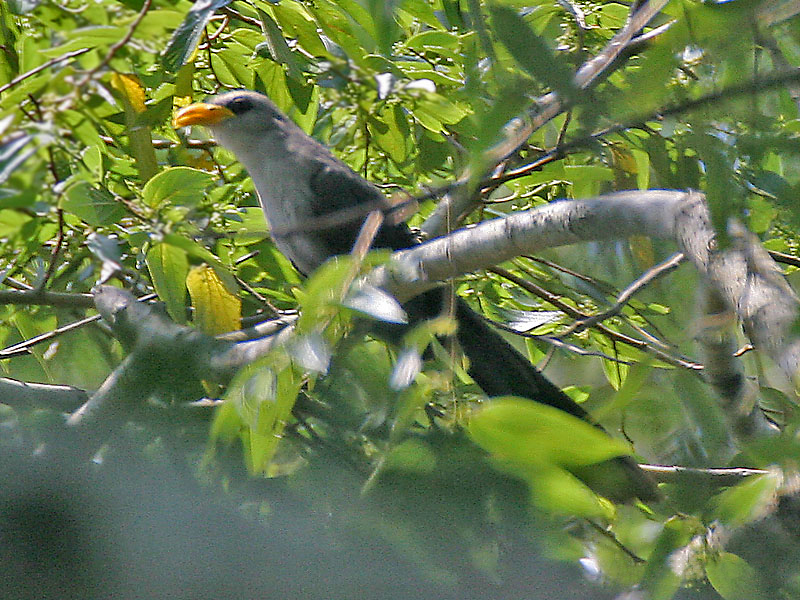
Blue malkoha

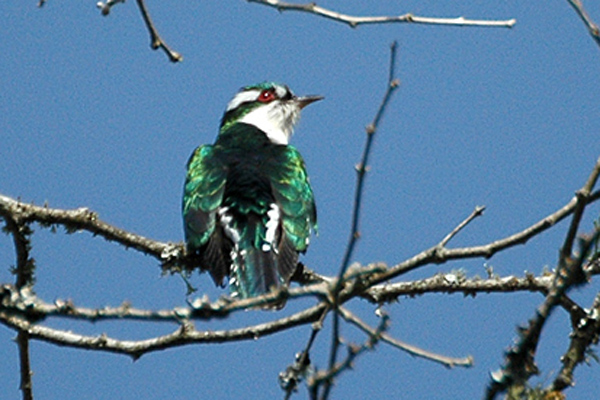
Dideric cuckoo at Lake Mburo, Uganda

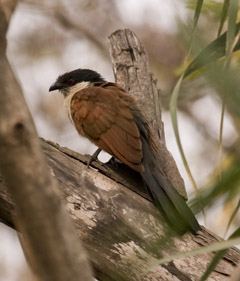
Senegal coucal

Order: Cuculiformes Family: Cuculidae

The family Cuculidae includes cuckoos, roadrunners, and anis. These birds are of variable size with slender bodies, long tails, and strong legs. The Old World cuckoos are brood parasites.

- Black-throated coucal, Centropus leucogaster
- Senegal coucal, Centropus senegalensis
- Blue-headed coucal, Centropus monachus
- White-browed coucal, Centropus superciliosus
- Black coucal, Centropus grillii
- Blue malkoha, Ceuthmochares aereus
- Green malkoha, Ceuthmochares australis
- Great spotted cuckoo, Clamator glandarius
- Levaillant's cuckoo, Clamator levaillantii
- Pied cuckoo, Clamator jacobinus
- Thick-billed cuckoo, Pachycoccyx audeberti (A)
- Dideric cuckoo, Chrysococcyx caprius
- Klaas's cuckoo, Chrysococcyx klaas
- Yellow-throated cuckoo, Chrysococcyx flavigularis
- African emerald cuckoo, Chrysococcyx cupreus
- Dusky long-tailed cuckoo, Cercococcyx mechowi
- Olive long-tailed cuckoo, Cercococcyx olivinus
- Barred long-tailed cuckoo, Cercococcyx montanus
- Black cuckoo, Cuculus clamosus
- Red-chested cuckoo, Cuculus solitarius
- Lesser cuckoo, Cuculus poliocephalus
- African cuckoo, Cuculus gularis
- Madagascar cuckoo, Cuculus rochii (A)
- Common cuckoo, Cuculus canorus

== Nightjars and allies ==
Order: Caprimulgiformes Family: Caprimulgidae

Nightjars are medium-sized nocturnal birds that usually nest on the ground. They have long wings, short legs, and very short bills. Most have small feet, of little use for walking, and long pointed wings. Their soft plumage is camouflaged to resemble bark or leaves.

- Pennant-winged nightjar, Caprimulgus vexillarius
- Standard-winged nightjar, Caprimulgus longipennis
- Eurasian nightjar, Caprimulgus europaeus
- Sombre nightjar, Caprimulgus fraenatus (A)
- Nubian nightjar, Caprimulgus nubicus
- Fiery-necked nightjar, Caprimulgus pectoralis
- Montane nightjar, Caprimulgus poliocephalus
- Swamp nightjar, Caprimulgus natalensis
- Plain nightjar, Caprimulgus inornatus
- Star-spotted nightjar, Caprimulgus stellatus
- Freckled nightjar, Caprimulgus tristigma
- Bates's nightjar, Caprimulgus batesi
- Long-tailed nightjar, Caprimulgus climacurus
- Slender-tailed nightjar, Caprimulgus clarus
- Square-tailed nightjar, Caprimulgus fossii

== Swifts ==
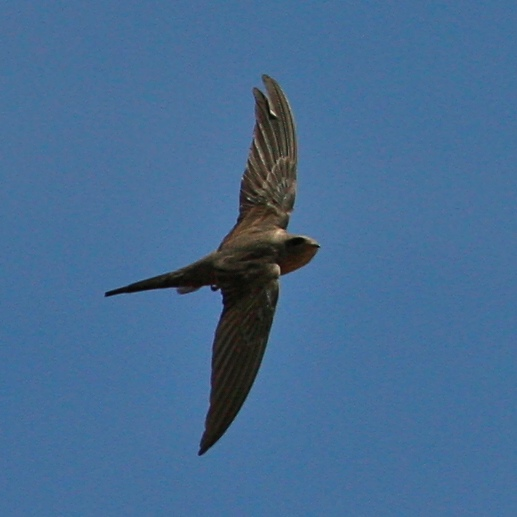
African palm-swift

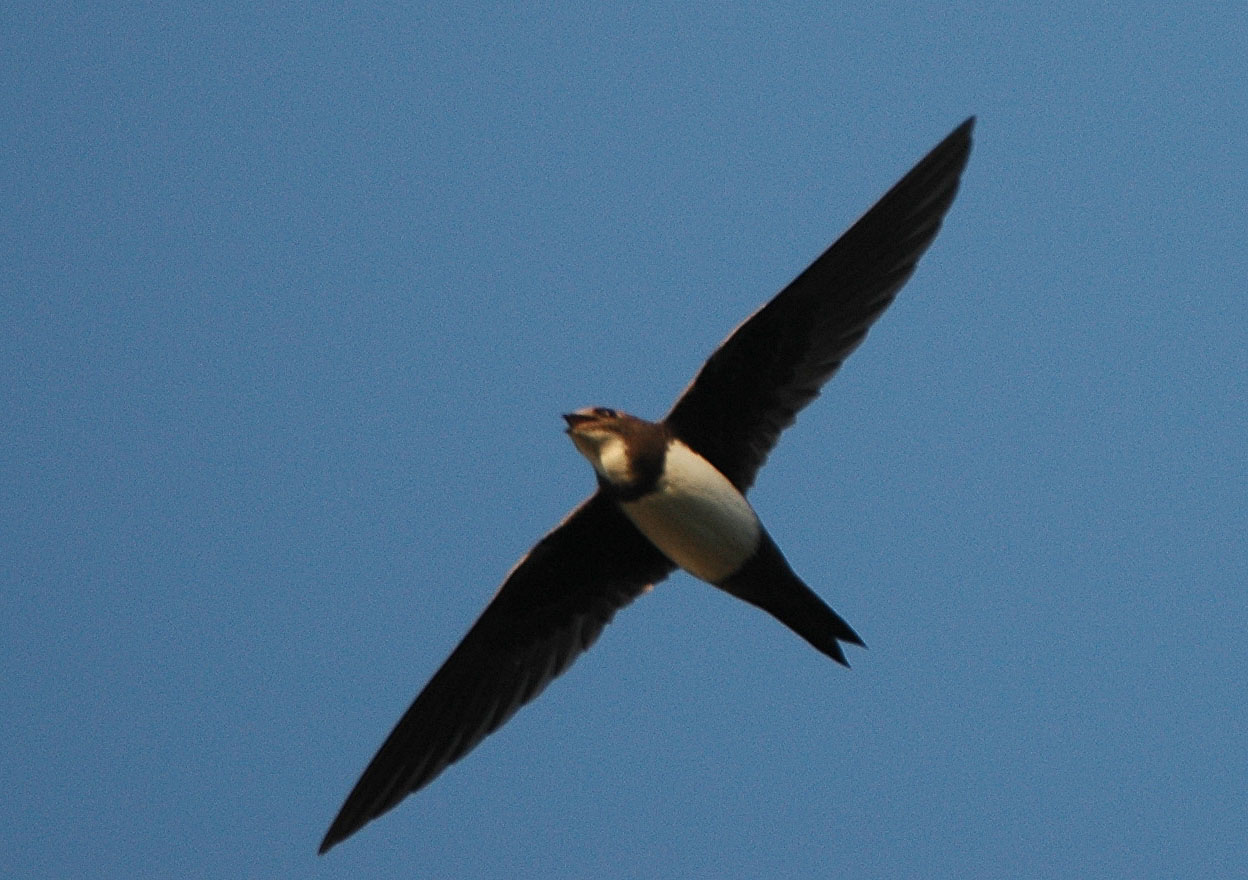
Alpine swift

Order: Caprimulgiformes Family: Apodidae

Swifts are small birds which spend the majority of their lives flying. These birds have very short legs and never settle voluntarily on the ground, perching instead only on vertical surfaces. Many swifts have long swept-back wings which resemble a crescent or boomerang.

- Mottled spinetail, Telacanthura ussheri
- Sabine's spinetail, Rhaphidura sabini
- Cassin's spinetail, Neafrapus cassini
- Scarce swift, Schoutedenapus myoptilus
- Alpine swift, Apus melba
- Mottled swift, Apus aequatorialis
- Common swift, Apus apus
- Nyanza swift, Apus niansae
- Pallid swift, Apus pallidus (A)
- African swift, Apus barbatus
- Little swift, Apus affinis
- Horus swift, Apus horus
- White-rumped swift, Apus caffer
- African palm-swift, Cypsiurus parvus

== Flufftails ==
Order: Gruiformes Family: Sarothruridae

The flufftails are a small family of ground-dwelling birds found only in Madagascar and sub-Saharan Africa.

- White-spotted flufftail, Sarothrura pulchra
- Buff-spotted flufftail, Sarothrura elegans
- Red-chested flufftail, Sarothrura rufa

== Rails, gallinules, and coots ==
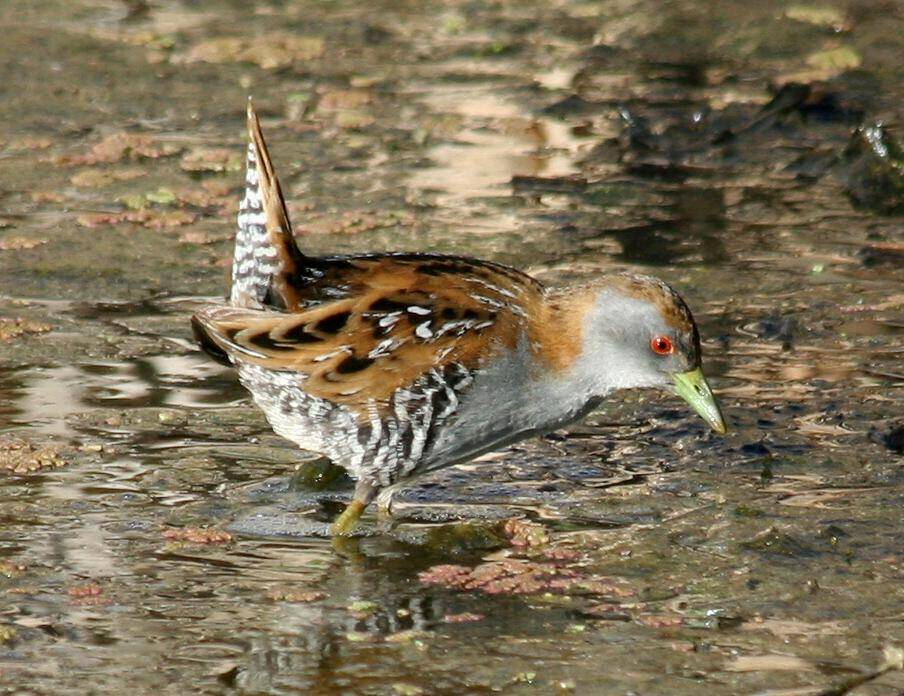
Baillon's crake

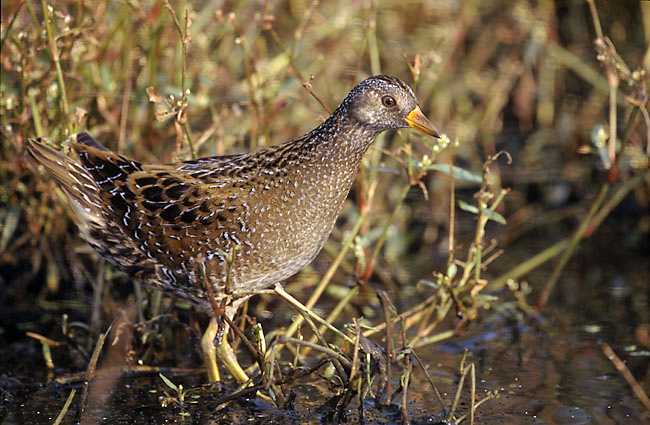
Spotted crake

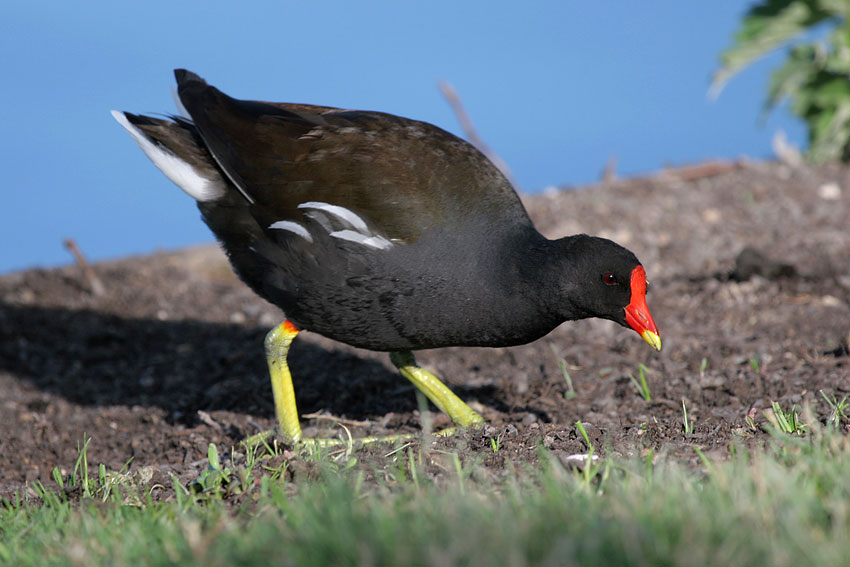
Eurasian moorhen

Order: Gruiformes Family: Rallidae

Rallidae is a large family of small to medium-sized birds which includes the rails, crakes, coots, and gallinules. Typically they inhabit dense vegetation in damp environments near lakes, swamps, or rivers. In general they are shy and secretive birds, making them difficult to observe. Most species have strong legs and long toes which are well adapted to soft uneven surfaces. They tend to have short, rounded wings and to be weak fliers.

- African rail, Rallus caerulescens
- Corn crake, Crex crex
- African crake, Crex egregia
- Gray-throated rail, Canirallus oculeus
- Spotted crake, Porzana porzana (A)
- Lesser moorhen, Paragallinula angulata
- Eurasian moorhen, Gallinula chloropus
- Red-knobbed coot, Fulica cristata
- Allen's gallinule, Porphyrio alleni
- African swamphen, Porphyrio madagascariensis
- Nkulengu rail, Himantornis haematopus
- Striped crake, Amaurornis marginalis (A)
- Black crake, Zapornia flavirostra
- Little crake, Zapornia parva (A)
- Baillon's crake, Zapornia pusilla (A)

== Finfoots ==
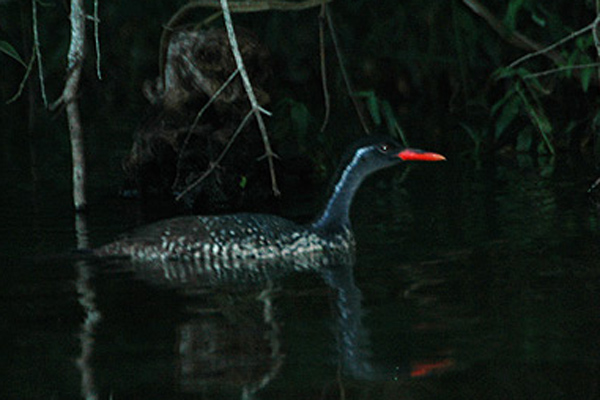
African finfoot

Order: Gruiformes Family: Heliornithidae

Heliornithidae is a small family of tropical birds with webbed lobes on their feet similar to those of grebes and coots.

- African finfoot, Podica senegalensis

== Cranes ==
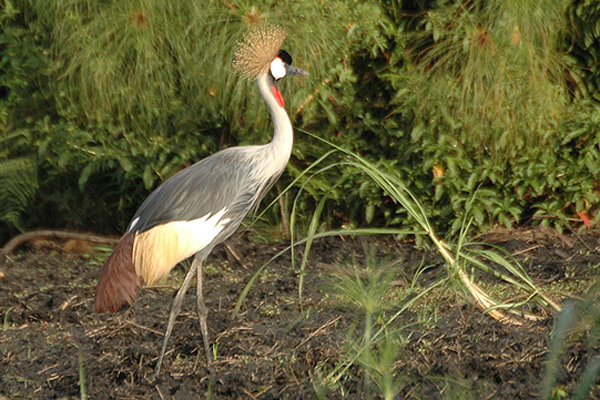
Gray crowned-crane, the national bird of Uganda

Order: Gruiformes Family: Gruidae

Cranes are large, long-legged and long-necked birds. Unlike the similar-looking but unrelated herons, cranes fly with necks outstretched, not pulled back. Most have elaborate and noisy courting displays or "dances".

- Gray crowned-crane, Balearica regulorum
- Black crowned-crane, Balearica pavonina (A)

== Thick-knees ==
Order: Charadriiformes Family: Burhinidae

The thick-knees are a group of waders found worldwide within the tropical zone, with some species also breeding in temperate Europe and Australia. They are medium to large waders with strong black or yellow-black bills, large yellow eyes, and cryptic plumage. Despite being classed as waders, most species have a preference for arid or semi-arid habitats.

- Water thick-knee, Burhinus vermiculatus
- Eurasian thick-knee, Burhinus oedicnemus (A)
- Indian thick-knee, Burhinus indicus
- Senegal thick-knee, Burhinus senegalensis
- Spotted thick-knee, Burhinus capensis

== Egyptian plover ==
Order: Charadriiformes Family: Pluvianidae

The Egyptian plover is found across equatorial Africa and along the Nile River.

- Egyptian plover, Pluvianus aegyptius (A)

== Stilts and avocets ==
Order: Charadriiformes Family: Recurvirostridae

Recurvirostridae is a family of large wading birds which includes the avocets and stilts. The avocets have long legs and long up-curved bills. The stilts have extremely long legs and long, thin, straight bills.

- Black-winged stilt, Himantopus himantopus
- Pied avocet, Recurvirostra avosetta

== Oystercatchers ==
Order: Charadriiformes Family: Haematopodidae

The oystercatchers are large and noisy plover-like birds with strong bills used for smashing or prising open molluscs.

- Eurasian oystercatcher, Haematopus ostralegus

== Plovers and lapwings ==
Order: Charadriiformes Family: Charadriidae

The family Charadriidae includes the plovers, dotterels, and lapwings. They are small to medium-sized birds with compact bodies, short thick necks, and long, usually pointed, wings. They are found in open country worldwide, mostly in habitats near water.

- Black-bellied plover, Pluvialis squatarola
- Pacific golden-plover, Pluvialis fulva (A)
- Long-toed lapwing, Vanellus crassirostris
- Spur-winged plover, Vanellus spinosus
- Black-headed lapwing, Vanellus tectus
- White-headed lapwing, Vanellus albiceps (A)
- Senegal lapwing, Vanellus lugubris
- Crowned lapwing, Vanellus coronatus
- Wattled lapwing, Vanellus senegallus
- Brown-chested lapwing, Vanellus superciliosus
- Lesser sand-plover, Charadrius mongolus (A)
- Greater sand-plover, Charadrius leschenaultii (A)
- Caspian plover, Charadrius asiaticus
- Kittlitz's plover, Charadrius pecuarius
- Kentish plover, Charadrius alexandrinus (A)
- Common ringed plover, Charadrius hiaticula
- Little ringed plover, Charadrius dubius
- Three-banded plover, Charadrius tricollaris
- Forbes's plover, Charadrius forbesi (A)
- White-fronted plover, Charadrius marginatus

== Painted-snipes ==
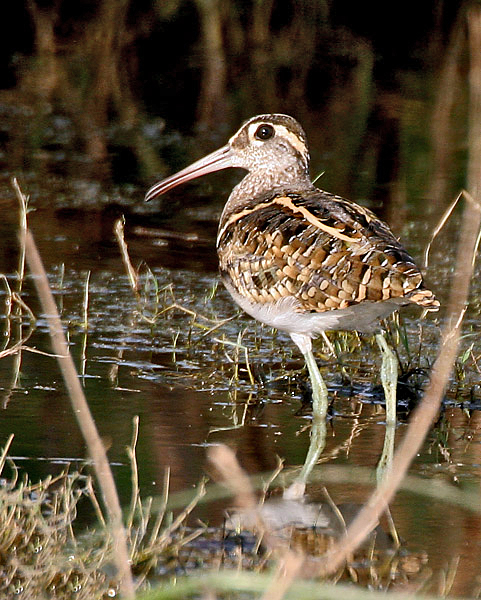
Greater painted-snipe

Order: Charadriiformes Family: Rostratulidae

Painted-snipes are short-legged, long-billed birds similar in shape to the true snipes, but more brightly coloured.

- Greater painted-snipe, Rostratula benghalensis

== Jacanas ==
Order: Charadriiformes Family: Jacanidae

The jacanas are a group of waders found throughout the tropics. They are identifiable by their huge feet and claws which enable them to walk on floating vegetation in the shallow lakes that are their preferred habitat.

- Lesser jacana, Microparra capensis
- African jacana, Actophilornis africanus

== Sandpipers and allies ==
Order: Charadriiformes Family: Scolopacidae

Scolopacidae is a large diverse family of small to medium-sized shorebirds including the sandpipers, curlews, godwits, shanks, tattlers, woodcocks, snipes, dowitchers, and phalaropes. The majority of these species eat small invertebrates picked out of the mud or soil. Variation in length of legs and bills enables multiple species to feed in the same habitat, particularly on the coast, without direct competition for food.

- Whimbrel, Numenius phaeopus
- Eurasian curlew, Numenius arquata
- Bar-tailed godwit, Limosa lapponica (A)
- Black-tailed godwit, Limosa limosa
- Ruddy turnstone, Arenaria interpres
- Ruff, Calidris pugnax
- Broad-billed sandpiper, Calidris falcinellus (A)
- Curlew sandpiper, Calidris ferruginea
- Temminck's stint, Calidris temminckii
- Sanderling, Calidris alba
- Dunlin, Calidris alpina (A)
- Little stint, Calidris minuta
- Pectoral sandpiper, Calidris melanotos (A)
- Jack snipe, Lymnocryptes minimus
- Great snipe, Gallinago media
- Common snipe, Gallinago gallinago
- African snipe, Gallinago nigripennis
- Terek sandpiper, Xenus cinereus
- Red-necked phalarope, Phalaropus lobatus (A)
- Common sandpiper, Actitis hypoleucos
- Green sandpiper, Tringa ochropus
- Spotted redshank, Tringa erythropus
- Common greenshank, Tringa nebularia
- Lesser yellowlegs, Tringa flavipes (A)
- Marsh sandpiper, Tringa stagnatilis
- Wood sandpiper, Tringa glareola
- Common redshank, Tringa totanus

== Buttonquails ==
Order: Charadriiformes Family: Turnicidae

The buttonquails are small, drab, running birds which resemble the true quails. The female is the brighter of the sexes and initiates courtship. The male incubates the eggs and tends the young.

- Small buttonquail, Turnix sylvaticus
- Black-rumped buttonquail, Turnix nanus
- Quail-plover, Ortyxelos meiffrenii (A)

== Pratincoles and coursers ==
Order: Charadriiformes Family: Glareolidae

Glareolidae is a family of wading birds comprising the pratincoles, which have short legs, long pointed wings, and long forked tails, and the coursers, which have long legs, short wings, and long, pointed bills which curve downwards.

- Temminck's courser, Cursorius temminckii
- Three-banded courser, Rhinoptilus cinctus
- Bronze-winged courser, Rhinoptilus chalcopterus
- Collared pratincole, Glareola pratincola
- Black-winged pratincole, Glareola nordmanni
- Madagascar pratincole, Glareola ocularis (A)
- Rock pratincole, Glareola nuchalis
- Gray pratincole, Glareola cinerea (A)

== Gulls, terns, and skimmers ==
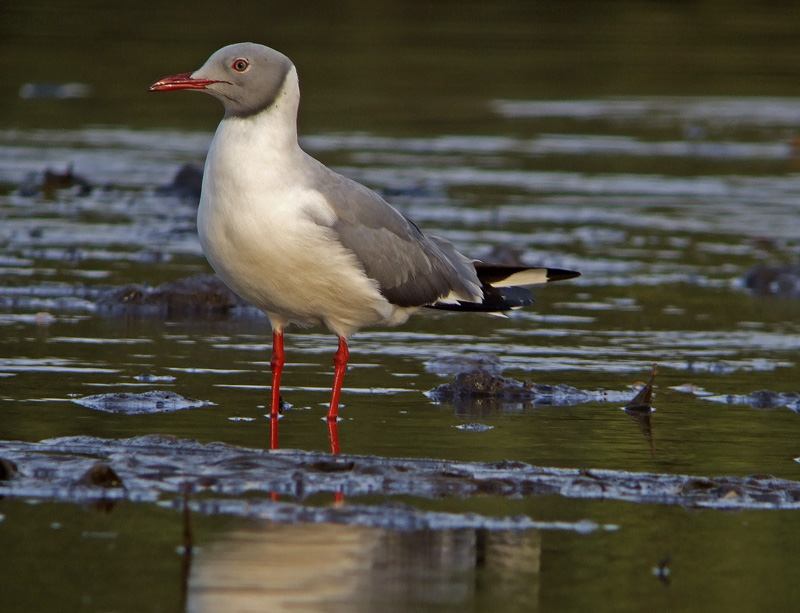
Gray-hooded gull

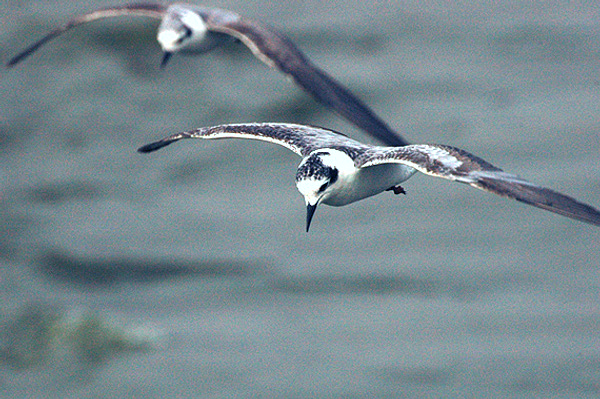
White-winged terns

Order: Charadriiformes Family: Laridae

Laridae is a family of medium to large seabirds, the gulls, terns, and skimmers. Gulls are typically grey or white, often with black markings on the head or wings. They have stout, longish bills and webbed feet. Terns are a group of generally medium to large seabirds typically with grey or white plumage, often with black markings on the head. Most terns hunt fish by diving but some pick insects off the surface of fresh water. Terns are generally long-lived birds, with several species known to live in excess of 30 years. Skimmers are a small family of tropical tern-like birds. They have an elongated lower mandible which they use to feed by flying low over the water surface and skimming the water for small fish.

- Slender-billed gull, Larus genei
- Gray-hooded gull, Chroicocephalus cirrocephalus
- Black-headed gull, Chroicocephalus ridibundus
- Pallas's gull, Ichthyaetus ichthyaetus (A)
- Caspian gull, Larus cachinnans (A)
- Lesser black-backed gull, Larus fuscus
- Gull-billed tern, Gelochelidon nilotica
- Caspian tern, Hydroprogne caspia (A)
- Black tern, Chlidonias niger
- White-winged tern, Chlidonias leucopterus
- Whiskered tern, Chlidonias hybrida
- Common tern, Sterna hirundo (A)
- Lesser crested tern, Thalasseus bengalensis (A)
- African skimmer, Rynchops flavirostris

== Shearwaters and petrels ==
Order: Procellariiformes Family: Procellariidae

The procellariids are the main group of medium-sized "true petrels", characterised by united nostrils with medium septum and a long outer functional primary.

- Southern giant-petrel, Macronectes giganteus (A)

== Storks ==
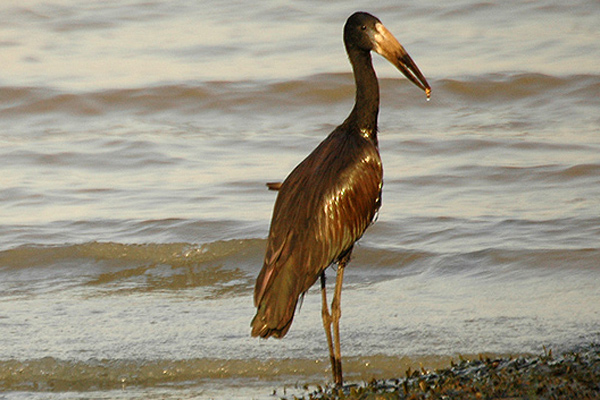
African openbill at Entebbe, Uganda

Order: Ciconiiformes Family: Ciconiidae

Storks are large, long-legged, long-necked, wading birds with long, stout bills. Storks are mute, but bill-clattering is an important mode of communication at the nest. Their nests can be large and may be reused for many years. Many species are migratory.

- African openbill, Anastomus lamelligerus
- Black stork, Ciconia nigra
- Abdim's stork, Ciconia abdimii
- African woolly-necked stork, Ciconia microscelis
- White stork, Ciconia ciconia
- Saddle-billed stork, Ephippiorhynchus senegalensis
- Marabou stork, Leptoptilos crumenifer
- Yellow-billed stork, Mycteria ibis

== Anhingas ==
Order: Suliformes Family: Anhingidae

Anhingas or darters are often called "snake-birds" because of their long thin neck, which gives a snake-like appearance when they swim with their bodies submerged. The males have black and dark-brown plumage, an erectile crest on the nape and a larger bill than the female. The females have much paler plumage especially on the neck and underparts. The darters have completely webbed feet and their legs are short and set far back on the body. Their plumage is somewhat permeable, like that of cormorants, and they spread their wings to dry after diving.

- African darter, Anhinga rufa

== Cormorants and shags ==
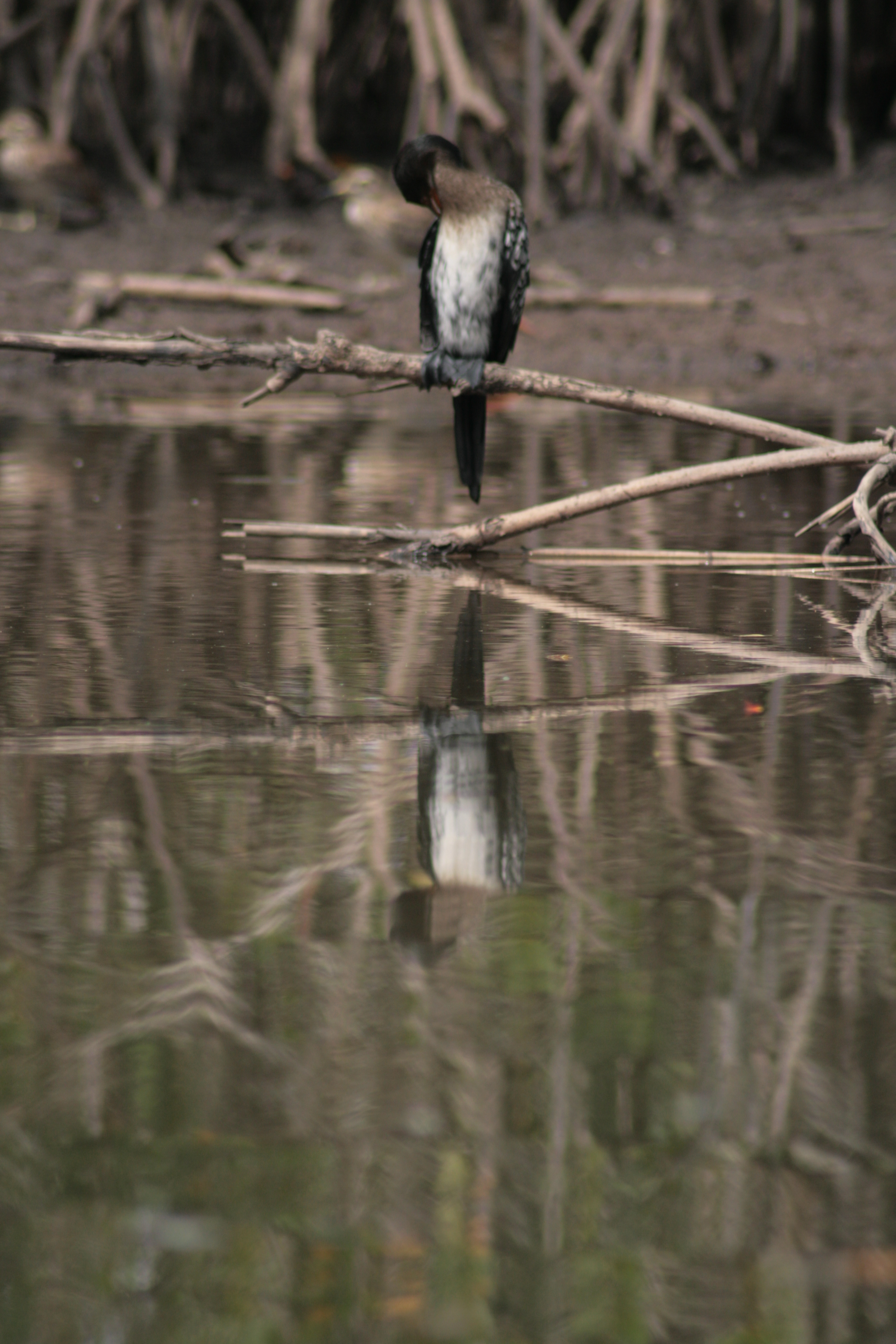
Immature long-tailed cormorant

Order: Suliformes Family: Phalacrocoracidae

Phalacrocoracidae is a family of medium to large coastal, fish-eating seabirds that includes cormorants and shags. Plumage colouration varies, with the majority having mainly dark plumage, some species being black-and-white, and a few being colourful.

- Long-tailed cormorant, Microcarbo africanus
- Great cormorant, Phalacrocorax carbo

== Pelicans ==
Order: Pelecaniformes Family: Pelecanidae

Pelicans are large water birds with a distinctive pouch under their beak. They have webbed feet with four toes.

- Great white pelican, Pelecanus onocrotalus
- Pink-backed pelican, Pelecanus rufescens

== Shoebill ==
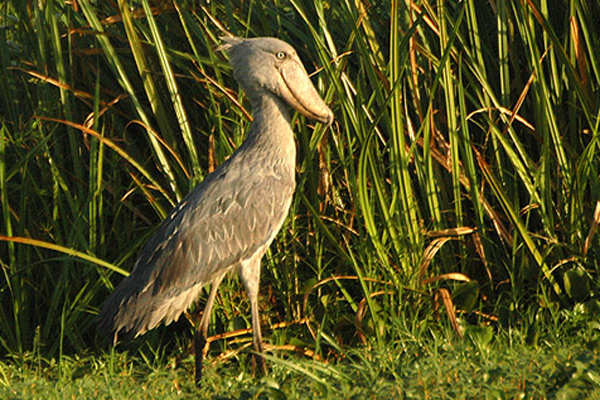
Shoebill at Murchison Falls NP, Uganda

Order: Pelecaniformes Family: Balaenicipididae

The shoebill is a large bird related to the storks. It derives its name from its massive shoe-shaped bill.

- Shoebill, Balaeniceps rex

== Hamerkop ==
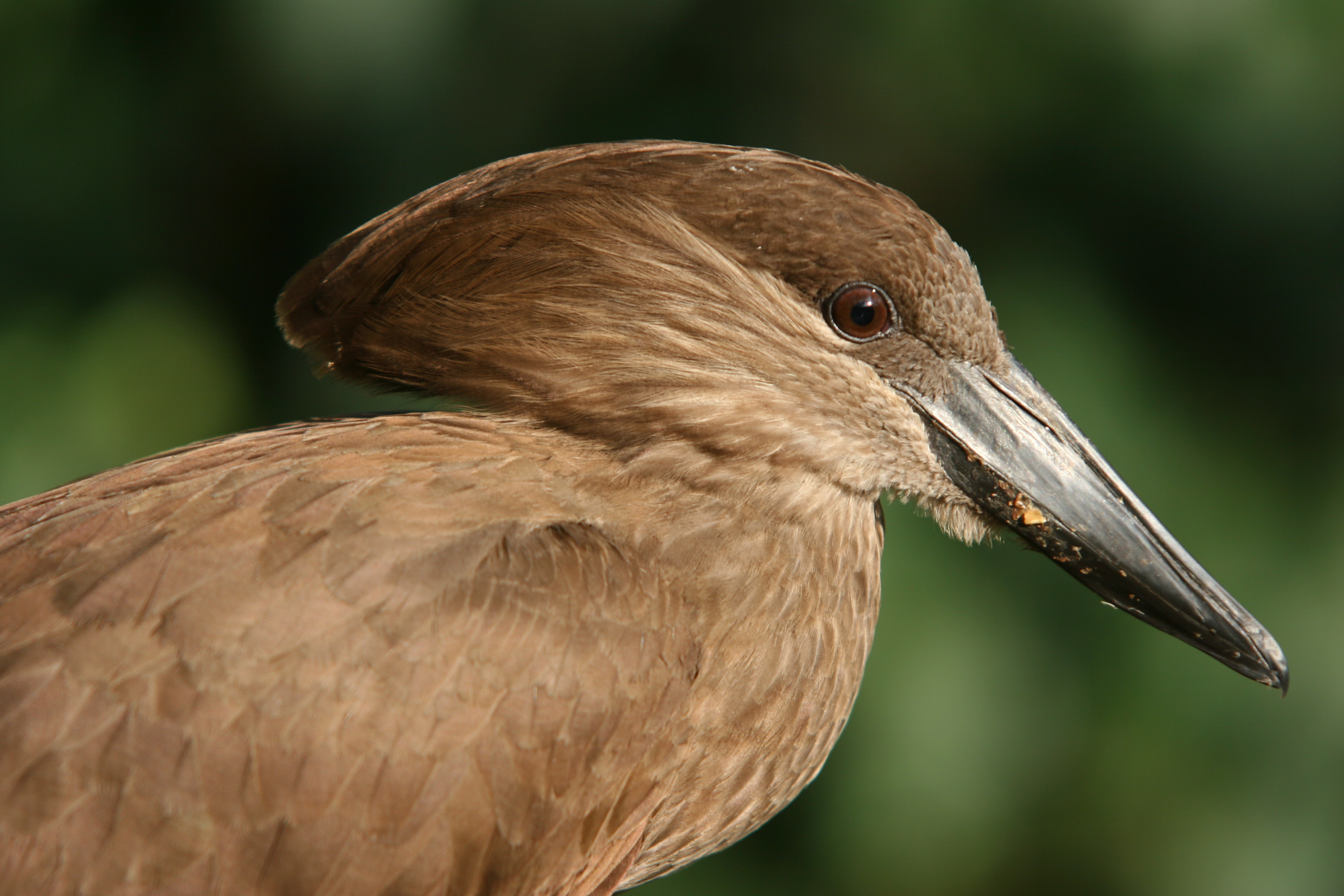
Hamerkop

Order: Pelecaniformes Family: Scopidae

The hamerkop is a medium-sized bird with a long shaggy crest. The shape of its head with a curved bill and crest at the back is reminiscent of a hammer, hence its name. Its plumage is drab-brown all over.

- Hamerkop, Scopus umbretta

== Herons, egrets, and bitterns ==
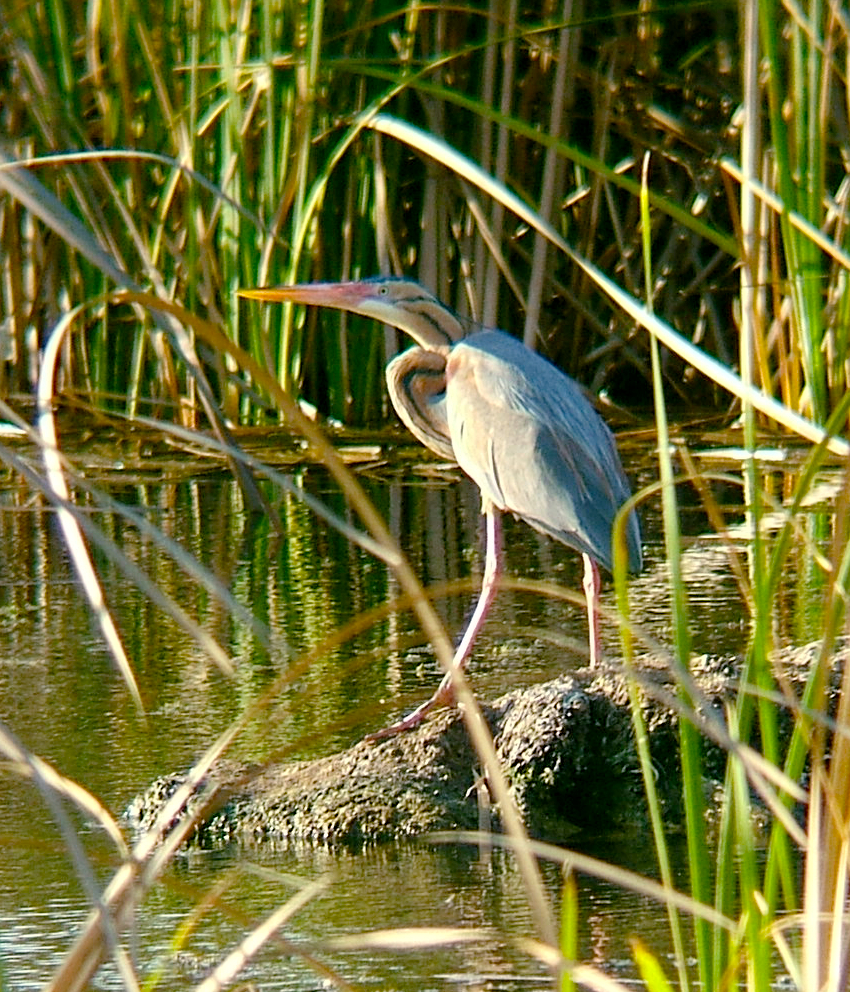
Purple heron

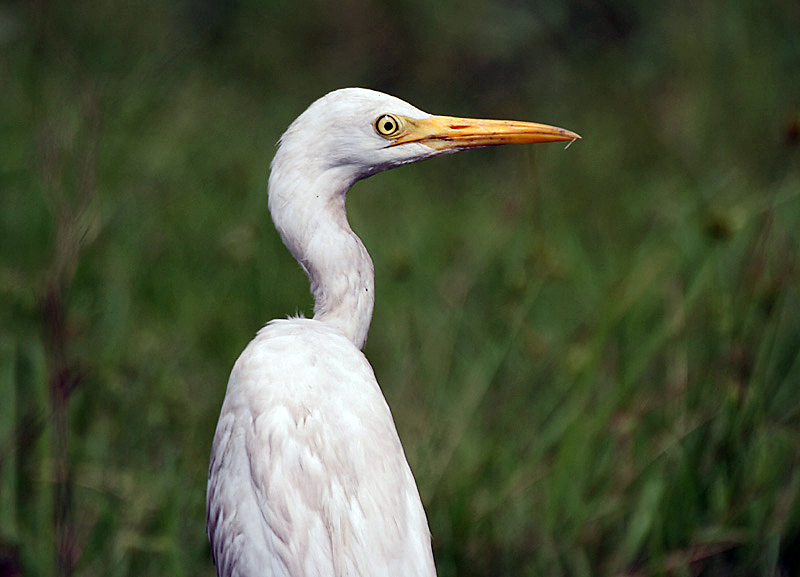
Cattle egret

Order: Pelecaniformes Family: Ardeidae

The family Ardeidae contains the bitterns, herons, and egrets. Herons and egrets are medium to large wading birds with long necks and legs. Bitterns tend to be shorter necked and more wary. Members of Ardeidae fly with their necks retracted, unlike other long-necked birds such as storks, ibises, and spoonbills.

- Great bittern, Botaurus stellaris (A)
- Little bittern, Ixobrychus minutus
- Dwarf bittern, Ixobrychus sturmii
- White-crested bittern, Tigriornis leucolopha (A)
- Gray heron, Ardea cinerea
- Black-headed heron, Ardea melanocephala
- Goliath heron, Ardea goliath
- Purple heron, Ardea purpurea
- Great egret, Ardea alba
- Intermediate egret, Ardea intermedia
- Little egret, Egretta garzetta
- Western reef-heron, Egretta gularis (A)
- Black heron, Egretta ardesiaca
- Cattle egret, Bubulcus ibis
- Squacco heron, Ardeola ralloides
- Malagasy pond-heron, Ardeola idae (A)
- Rufous-bellied heron, Ardeola rufiventris
- Striated heron, Butorides striata
- Black-crowned night-heron, Nycticorax nycticorax
- White-backed night-heron, Gorsachius leuconotus

== Ibises and spoonbills ==
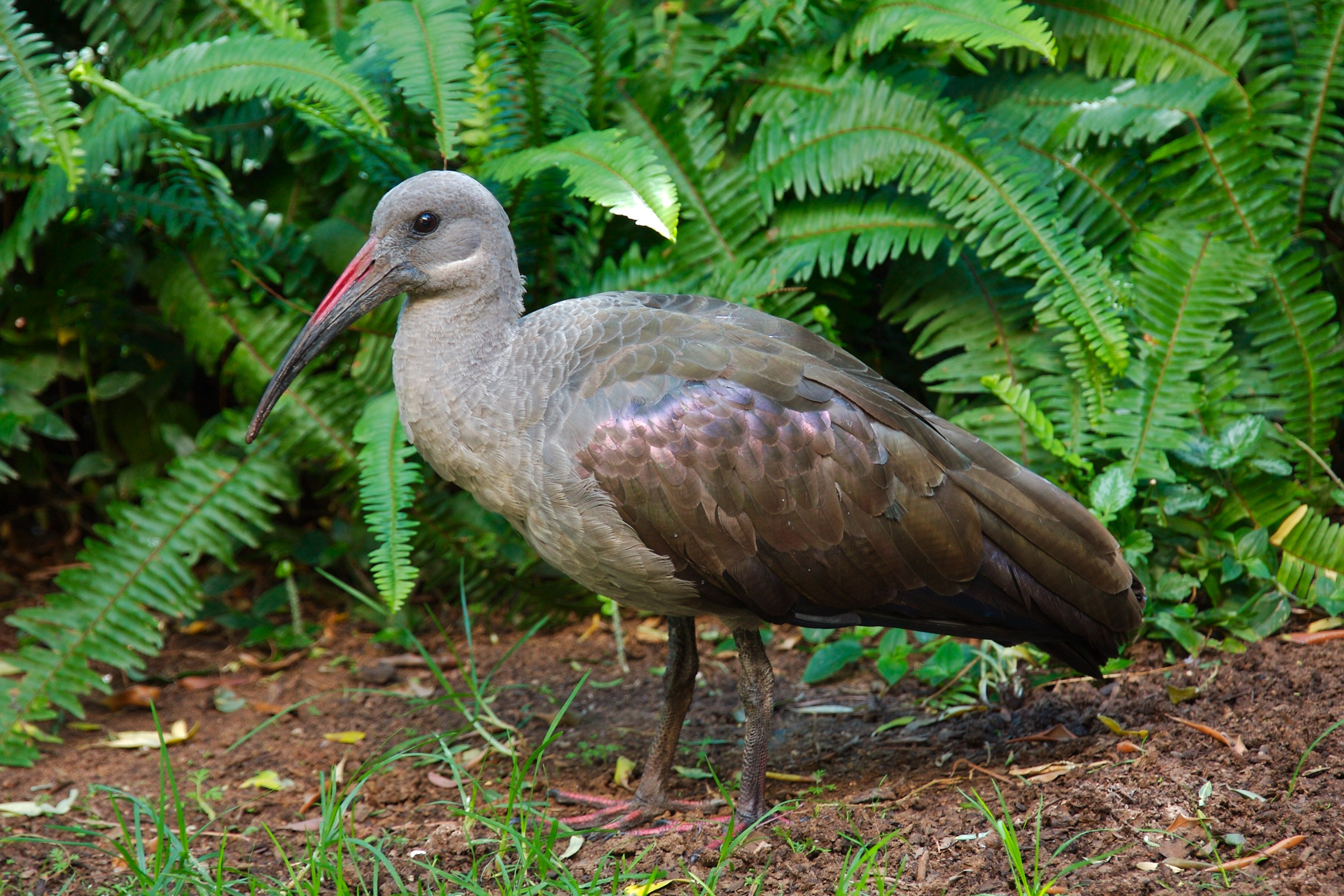
Hadada ibis

Order: Pelecaniformes Family: Threskiornithidae

Threskiornithidae is a family of large terrestrial and wading birds which includes the ibises and spoonbills. They have long, broad wings with 11 primary and about 20 secondary feathers. They are strong fliers and despite their size and weight, very capable soarers.

- Glossy ibis, Plegadis falcinellus
- African sacred ibis, Threskiornis aethiopicus
- Olive ibis, Bostrychia olivacea
- Spot-breasted ibis, Bostrychia rara
- Hadada ibis, Bostrychia hagedash
- Eurasian spoonbill, Platalea leucorodia
- African spoonbill, Platalea alba

== Secretarybird ==
Order: Accipitriformes Family: Sagittariidae

The secretarybird is a bird of prey, but is easily distinguished from other raptors by its long crane-like legs.

- Secretarybird, Sagittarius serpentarius

== Osprey ==
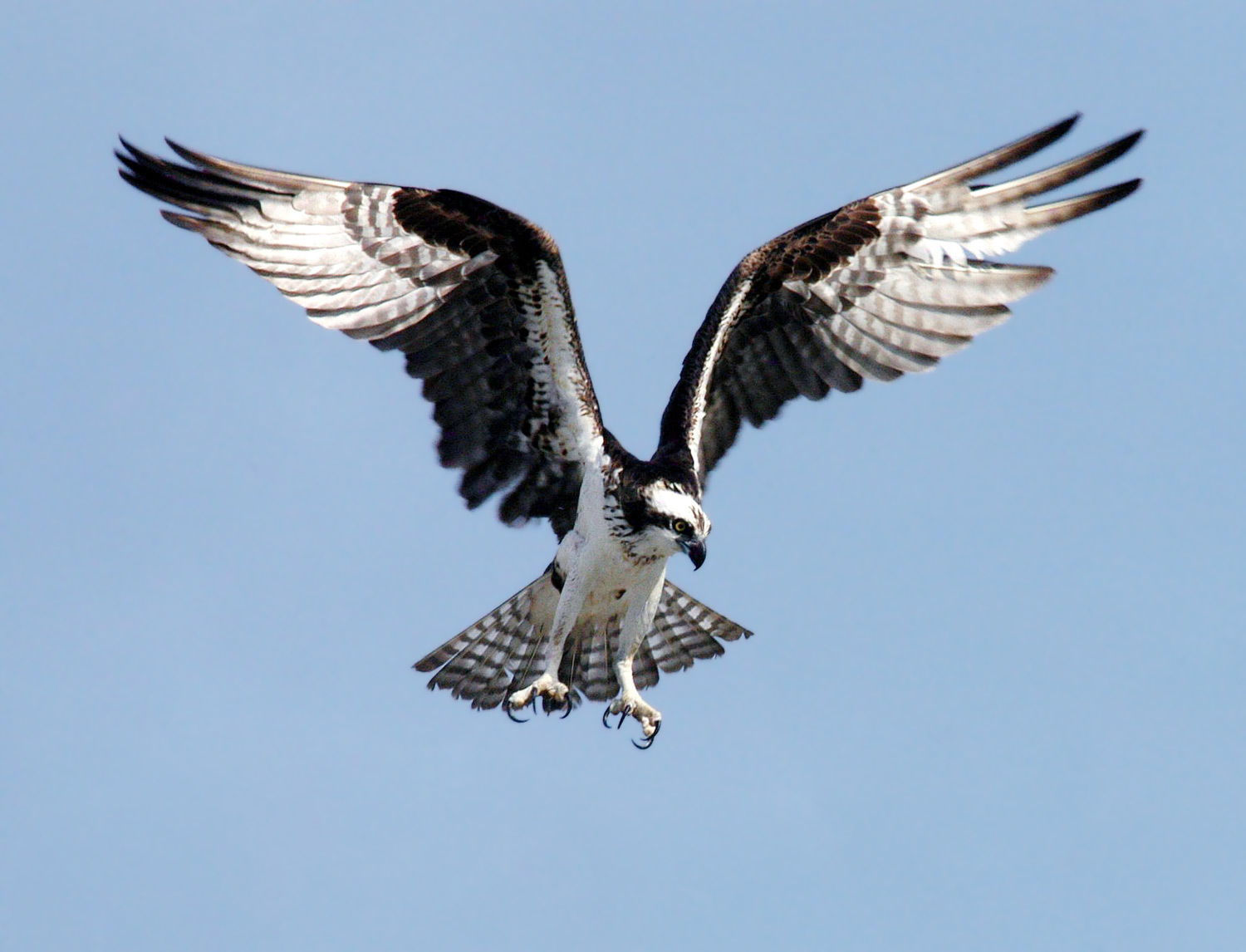
Osprey

Order: Accipitriformes Family: Pandionidae

The family Pandionidae contains only one species, the osprey. The osprey is a medium-large raptor which is a specialist fish-eater with a worldwide distribution.

- Osprey, Pandion haliaetus

== Hawks, eagles, and kites ==
Order: Accipitriformes Family: Accipitridae

Accipitridae is a family of birds of prey which includes hawks, eagles, kites, harriers, and Old World vultures. These birds have powerful hooked beaks for tearing flesh from their prey, strong legs, powerful talons, and keen eyesight.

- Black-winged kite, Elanus caeruleus
- Scissor-tailed kite, Chelictinia riocourii
- African harrier-hawk, Polyboroides typus
- Palm-nut vulture, Gypohierax angolensis
- Bearded vulture, Gypaetus barbatus
- Egyptian vulture, Neophron percnopterus
- European honey-buzzard, Pernis apivorus
- African cuckoo-hawk, Aviceda cuculoides
- White-headed vulture, Trigonoceps occipitalis
- Lappet-faced vulture, Torgos tracheliotos
- Hooded vulture, Necrosyrtes monachus
- White-backed vulture, Gyps africanus
- Rüppell's griffon, Gyps rueppelli
- Bateleur, Terathopius ecaudatus
- Congo serpent-eagle, Dryotriorchis spectabilis
- Short-toed snake-eagle, Circaetus gallicus (A)
- Beaudouin's snake-eagle, Circaetus beaudouini
- Black-chested snake-eagle, Circaetus pectoralis
- Brown snake-eagle, Circaetus cinereus
- Banded snake-eagle, Circaetus cinerascens
- Bat hawk, Macheiramphus alcinus
- Crowned eagle, Stephanoaetus coronatus
- Martial eagle, Polemaetus bellicosus
- Long-crested eagle, Lophaetus occipitalis
- Lesser spotted eagle, Clanga pomarina
- Greater spotted eagle, Clanga clanga
- Wahlberg's eagle, Hieraaetus wahlbergi
- Booted eagle, Hieraaetus pennatus
- Ayres's hawk-eagle, Hieraaetus ayresii
- Tawny eagle, Aquila rapax
- Steppe eagle, Aquila nipalensis
- Cassin's hawk-eagle, Aquila africana
- Verreaux's eagle, Aquila verreauxii
- African hawk-eagle, Aquila spilogaster
- Lizard buzzard, Kaupifalco monogrammicus
- Dark chanting-goshawk, Melierax metabates
- Eastern chanting-goshawk, Melierax poliopterus
- Gabar goshawk, Micronisus gabar
- Grasshopper buzzard, Butastur rufipennis
- Eurasian marsh-harrier, Circus aeruginosus
- African marsh-harrier, Circus ranivorus
- Pallid harrier, Circus macrourus
- Montagu's harrier, Circus pygargus
- African goshawk, Accipiter tachiro
- Chestnut-flanked sparrowhawk, Accipiter castanilius
- Shikra, Accipiter badius
- Levant sparrowhawk, Accipiter brevipes (A)
- Red-thighed sparrowhawk, Accipiter erythropus
- Little sparrowhawk, Accipiter minullus
- Ovambo sparrowhawk, Accipiter ovampensis
- Rufous-breasted sparrowhawk, Accipiter rufiventris
- Black goshawk, Accipiter melanoleucus
- Long-tailed hawk, Urotriorchis macrourus
- Black kite, Milvus migrans
- African fish-eagle, Haliaeetus vocifer
- Common buzzard, Buteo buteo
- Mountain buzzard, Buteo oreophilus
- Long-legged buzzard, Buteo rufinus
- Red-necked buzzard, Buteo auguralis
- Augur buzzard, Buteo augur
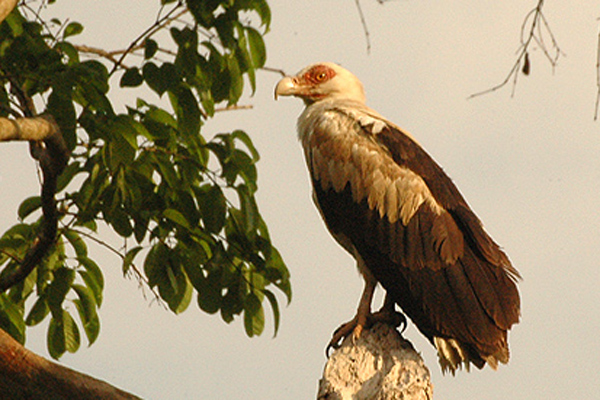
Palm-nut vulture

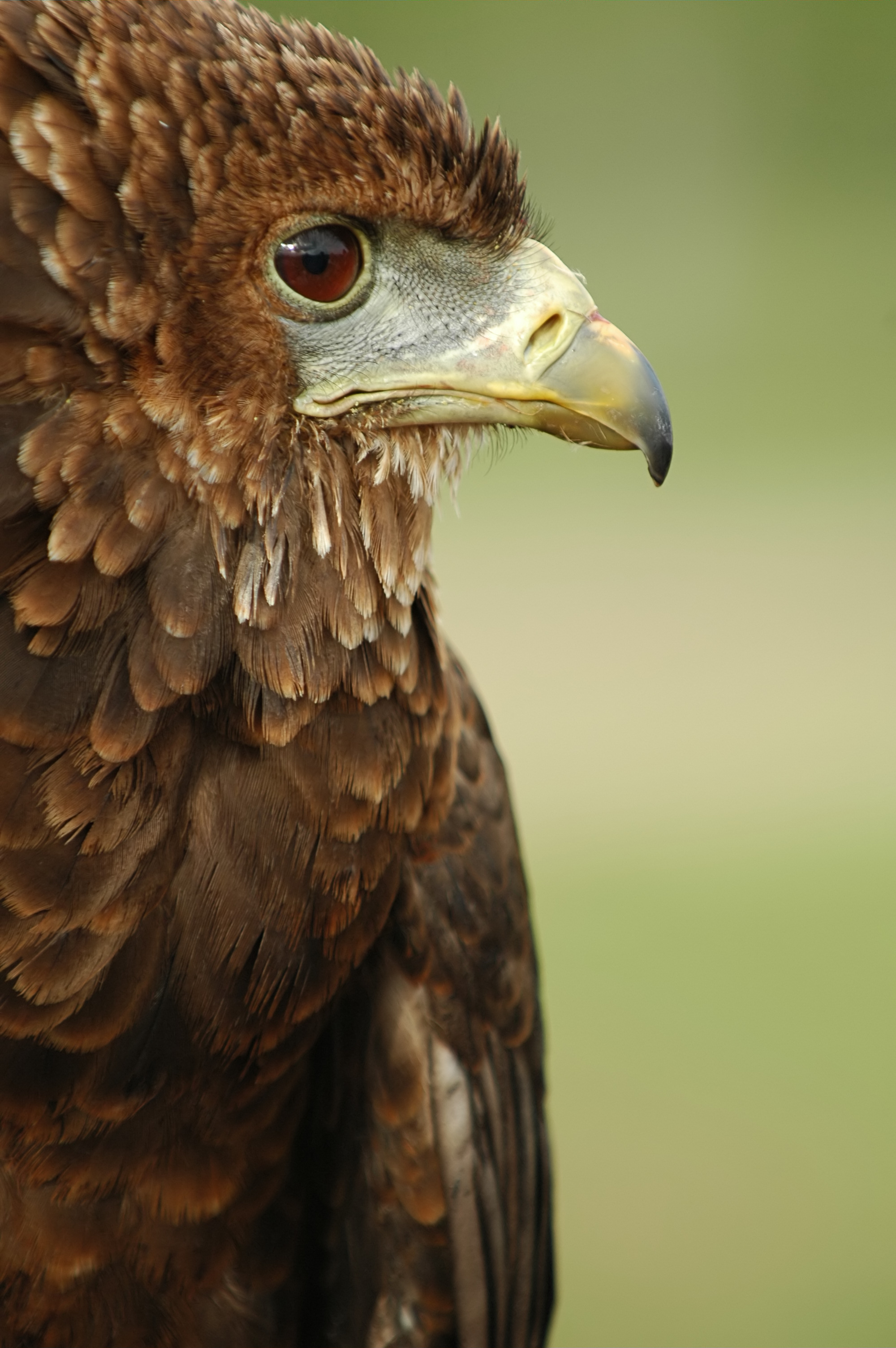
Juvenile bateleur

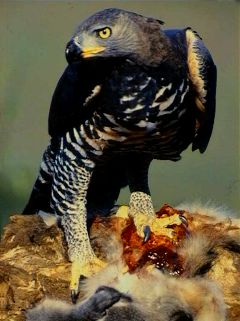
Crowned eagle

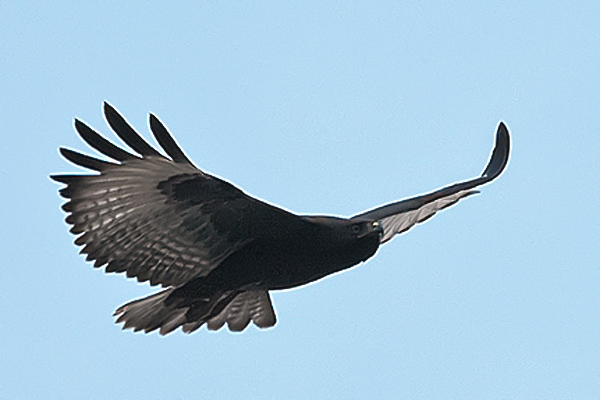
Augur buzzard in flight near Kisoro, Uganda

== Barn-owls ==
Order: Strigiformes Family: Tytonidae

Barn-owls are medium to large owls with large heads and characteristic heart-shaped faces. They have long strong legs with powerful talons.

- African grass-owl, Tyto capensis
- Western barn owl, Tyto alba

== Owls ==
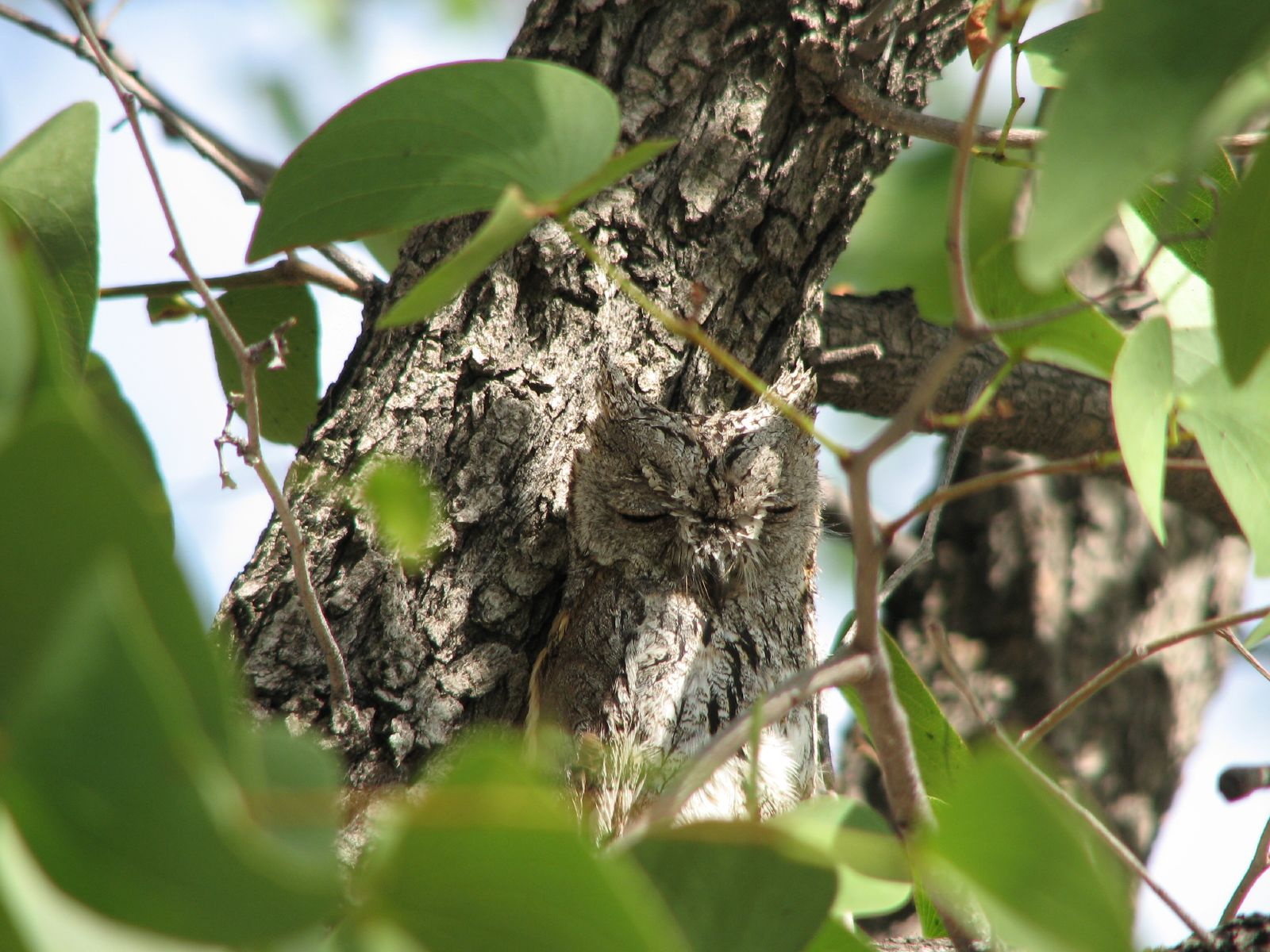
African scops-owl

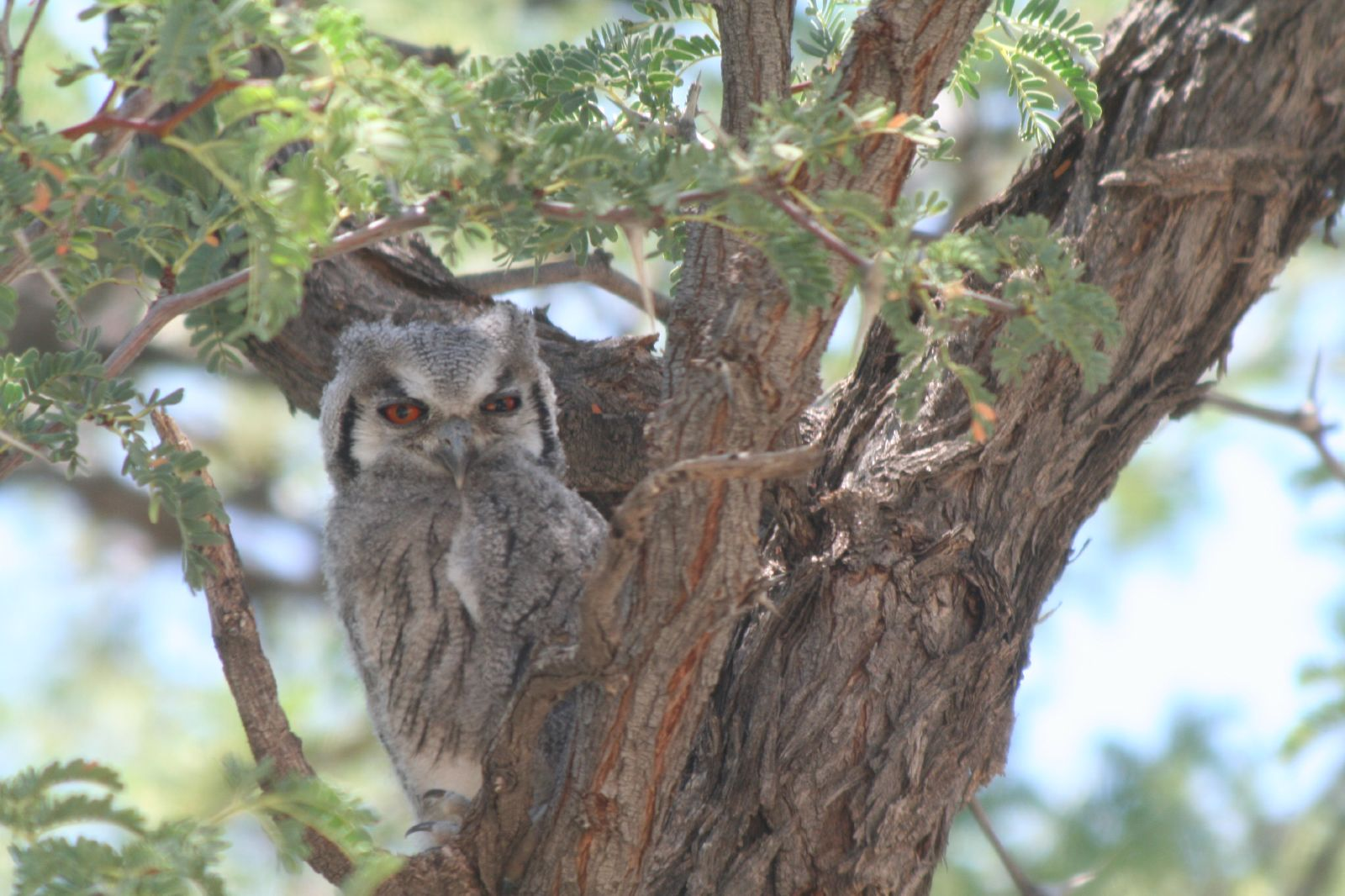
Southern white-faced owl

Order: Strigiformes Family: Strigidae

The typical owls are small to large solitary nocturnal birds of prey. They have large forward-facing eyes and ears, a hawk-like beak, and a conspicuous circle of feathers around each eye called a facial disk.

- Eurasian scops-owl, Otus scops
- African scops-owl, Otus senegalensis
- Northern white-faced owl, Ptilopsis leucotis
- Southern white-faced owl, Ptilopsis granti
- Cape eagle-owl, Bubo capensis
- Spotted eagle-owl, Bubo africanus
- Grayish eagle-owl, Bubo cinerascens
- Fraser's eagle-owl, Bubo poensis
- Shelley's eagle-owl, Bubo shelleyi
- Verreaux's eagle-owl, Bubo lacteus
- Pel's fishing owl, Scotopelia peli
- Pearl-spotted owlet, Glaucidium perlatum
- Red-chested owlet, Glaucidium tephronotum
- African barred owlet, Glaucidium capense
- African wood-owl, Strix woodfordii
- Short-eared owl, Asio flammeus
- Marsh owl, Asio capensis

== Mousebirds ==
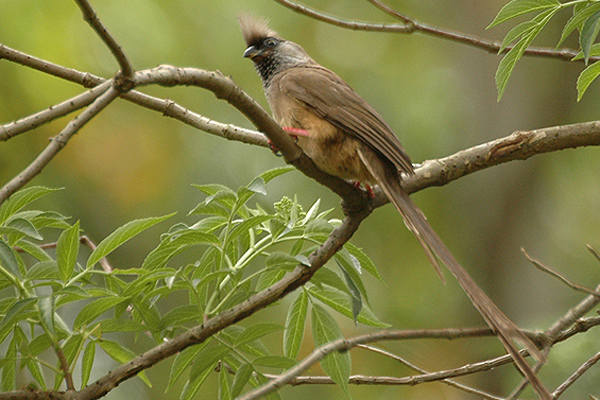
Speckled mousebird at Bwindi NP, Uganda

Order: Coliiformes Family: Coliidae

The mousebirds are slender greyish or brown birds with soft, hairlike body feathers and very long thin tails. They are arboreal and scurry through the leaves like rodents in search of berries, fruit, and buds. They are acrobatic and can feed upside down. All species have strong claws and reversible outer toes. They also have crests and stubby bills.

- Speckled mousebird, Colius striatus
- Blue-naped mousebird, Urocolius macrourus

== Trogons ==
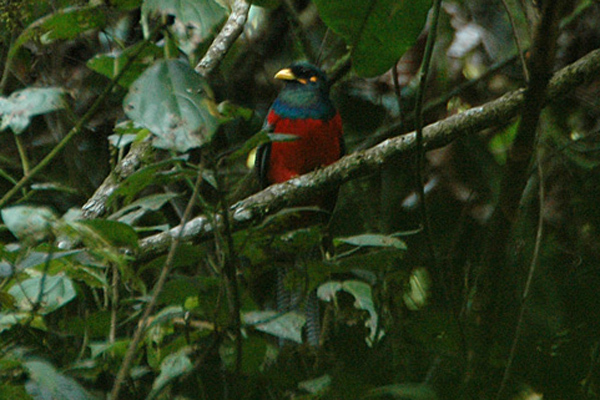
Bar-tailed trogon at Bwindi, W. Uganda

Order: Trogoniformes Family: Trogonidae

The family Trogonidae includes trogons and quetzals. Found in tropical woodlands worldwide, they feed on insects and fruit, and their broad bills and weak legs reflect their diet and arboreal habits. Although their flight is fast, they are reluctant to fly any distance. Trogons have soft, often colourful, feathers with distinctive male and female plumage.

- Narina trogon, Apaloderma narina
- Bar-tailed trogon, Apaloderma vittatum

== Hoopoes ==
Order: Coraciiformes Family: Upupidae

Hoopoes have black, white, and orangey-pink colouring with a large erectile crest on their head.

- Eurasian hoopoe, Upupa epops

== Woodhoopoes and scimitarbills ==
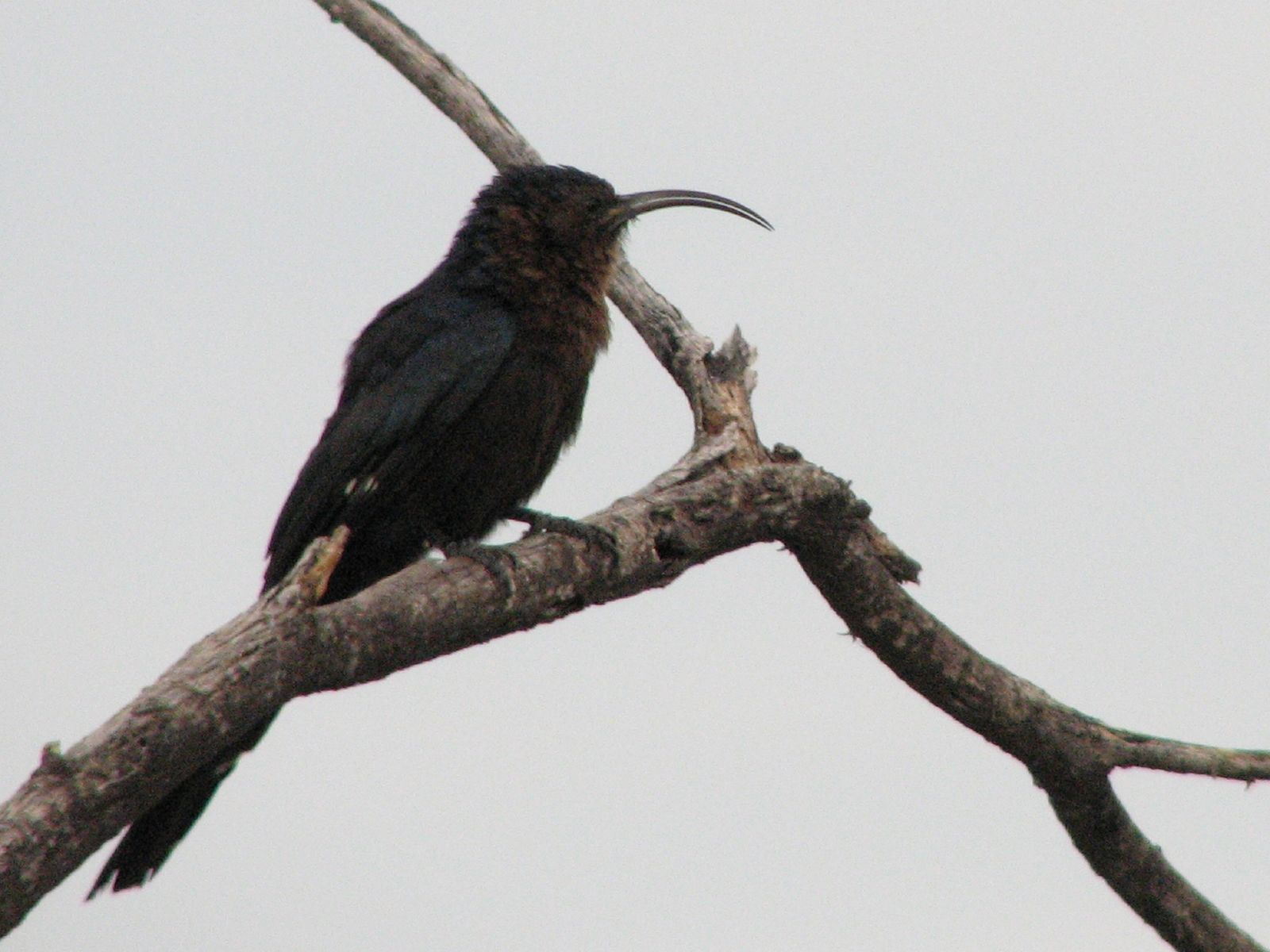
Common scimitarbill

Order: Coraciiformes Family: Phoeniculidae

The woodhoopoes are related to the hoopoes, ground-hornbills, and hornbills. They most resemble the hoopoes with their long curved bills, used to probe for insects, and short rounded wings. However, they differ in that they have metallic plumage, often blue, green, or purple, and lack an erectile crest.

- Green woodhoopoe, Phoeniculus purpureus
- White-headed woodhoopoe, Phoeniculus bollei
- Forest woodhoopoe, Phoeniculus castaneiceps
- Black scimitarbill, Rhinopomastus aterrimus
- Common scimitarbill, Rhinopomastus cyanomelas
- Abyssinian scimitarbill, Rhinopomastus minor

== Ground-hornbills ==
Order: Bucerotiformes Family: Bucorvidae

The ground-hornbills are terrestrial birds which feed almost entirely on insects, other birds, snakes, and amphibians.

- Abyssinian ground-hornbill, Bucorvus abyssinicus
- Southern ground-hornbill, Bucorvus leadbeateri

== Hornbills ==
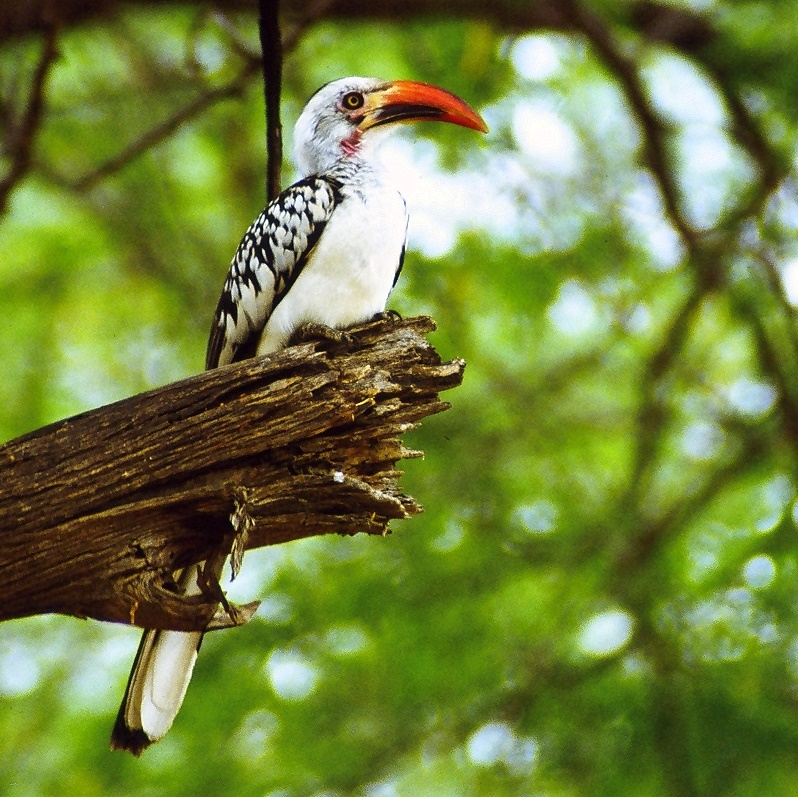
Northern red-billed hornbill

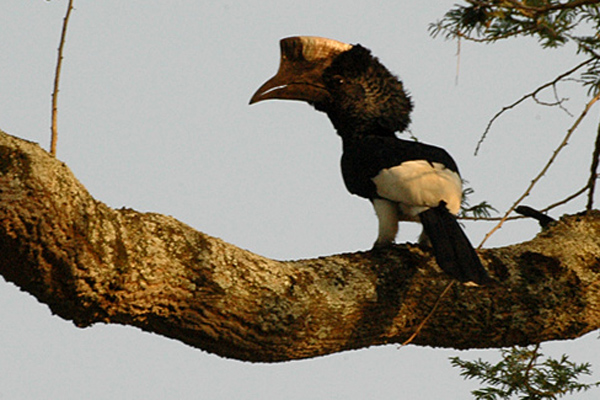
Black-and-white-casqued hornbill

Order: Coraciiformes Family: Bucerotidae

Hornbills are a group of birds whose bill is shaped like a cow's horn, but without a twist, sometimes with a casque on the upper mandible. Frequently, the bill is brightly coloured.

- Red-billed dwarf hornbill, Lophoceros camurus
- Crowned hornbill, Lophoceros alboterminatus
- African pied hornbill, Lophoceros fasciatus
- Hemprich's hornbill, Lophoceros hemprichii
- African gray hornbill, Lophoceros nasutus
- Eastern yellow-billed hornbill, Tockus flavirostris
- Jackson's hornbill, Tockus jacksoni
- Von der Decken's hornbill, Tockus deckeni
- Northern red-billed hornbill, Tockus erythrorhynchus
- White-crested hornbill, Horizocerus albocristatus
- Black dwarf hornbill, Horizocerus hartlaubi
- Black-casqued hornbill, Ceratogymna atrata
- Black-and-white-casqued hornbill, Bycanistes subcylindricus
- Brown-cheeked hornbill, Bycanistes cylindricus
- White-thighed hornbill, Bycanistes albotibialis
- Piping hornbill, Bycanistes fistulator

== Kingfishers ==
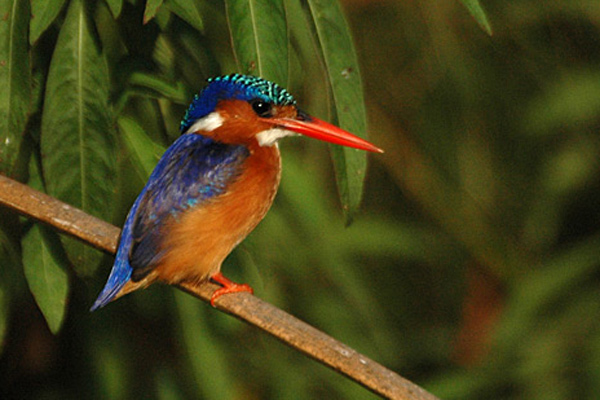
Malachite kingfisher

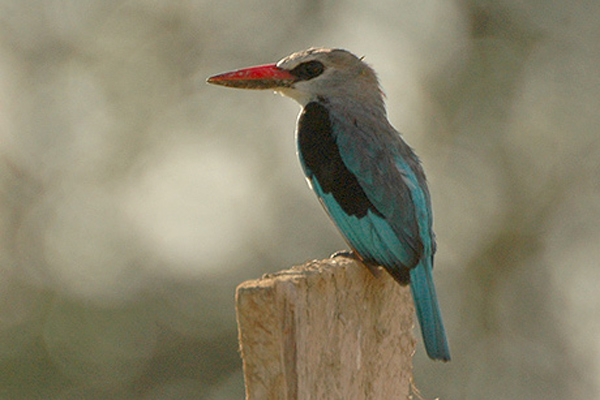
Woodland kingfisher

Order: Coraciiformes Family: Alcedinidae

Kingfishers are medium-sized birds with large heads, long, pointed bills, short legs, and stubby tails.

- Half-collared kingfisher, Alcedo semitorquata
- Shining-blue kingfisher, Alcedo quadribrachys
- Malachite kingfisher, Corythornis cristatus
- White-bellied kingfisher, Corythornis leucogaster
- African pygmy kingfisher, Ispidina picta
- African dwarf kingfisher, Ispidina lecontei
- Chocolate-backed kingfisher, Halcyon badia
- Gray-headed kingfisher, Halcyon leucocephala
- Woodland kingfisher, Halcyon senegalensis
- Blue-breasted kingfisher, Halcyon malimbica
- Striped kingfisher, Halcyon chelicuti
- Giant kingfisher, Megaceryle maximus
- Pied kingfisher, Ceryle rudis

== Bee-eaters ==
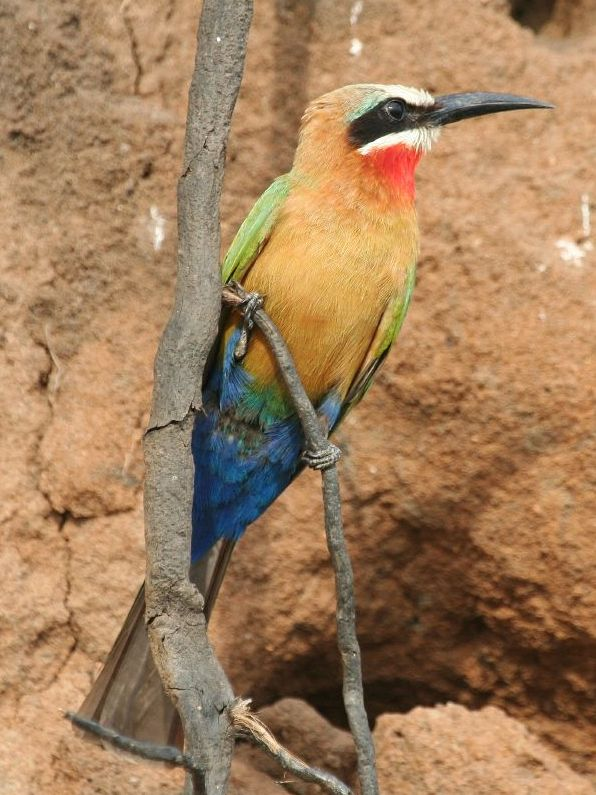
White-fronted bee-eater

Order: Coraciiformes Family: Meropidae

The bee-eaters are a group of near passerine birds. Most species are found in Africa but others occur in southern Europe, Madagascar, Australia, and New Guinea. They are characterised by richly coloured plumage, slender bodies, and usually elongated central tail feathers. All are colourful and have long downturned bills and pointed wings, which give them a swallow-like appearance when seen from afar.

- Black bee-eater, Merops gularis
- Red-throated bee-eater, Merops bulocki
- White-fronted bee-eater, Merops bullockoides
- Little bee-eater, Merops pusillus
- Blue-breasted bee-eater, Merops variegatus
- Cinnamon-chested bee-eater, Merops oreobates
- Swallow-tailed bee-eater, Merops hirundineus
- White-throated bee-eater, Merops albicollis
- African green bee-eater, Merops viridissimus
- Blue-cheeked bee-eater, Merops persicus
- Madagascar bee-eater, Merops superciliosus
- European bee-eater, Merops apiaster
- Northern carmine bee-eater, Merops nubicus
- Southern carmine bee-eater, Merops nubicoides (A)

== Rollers ==
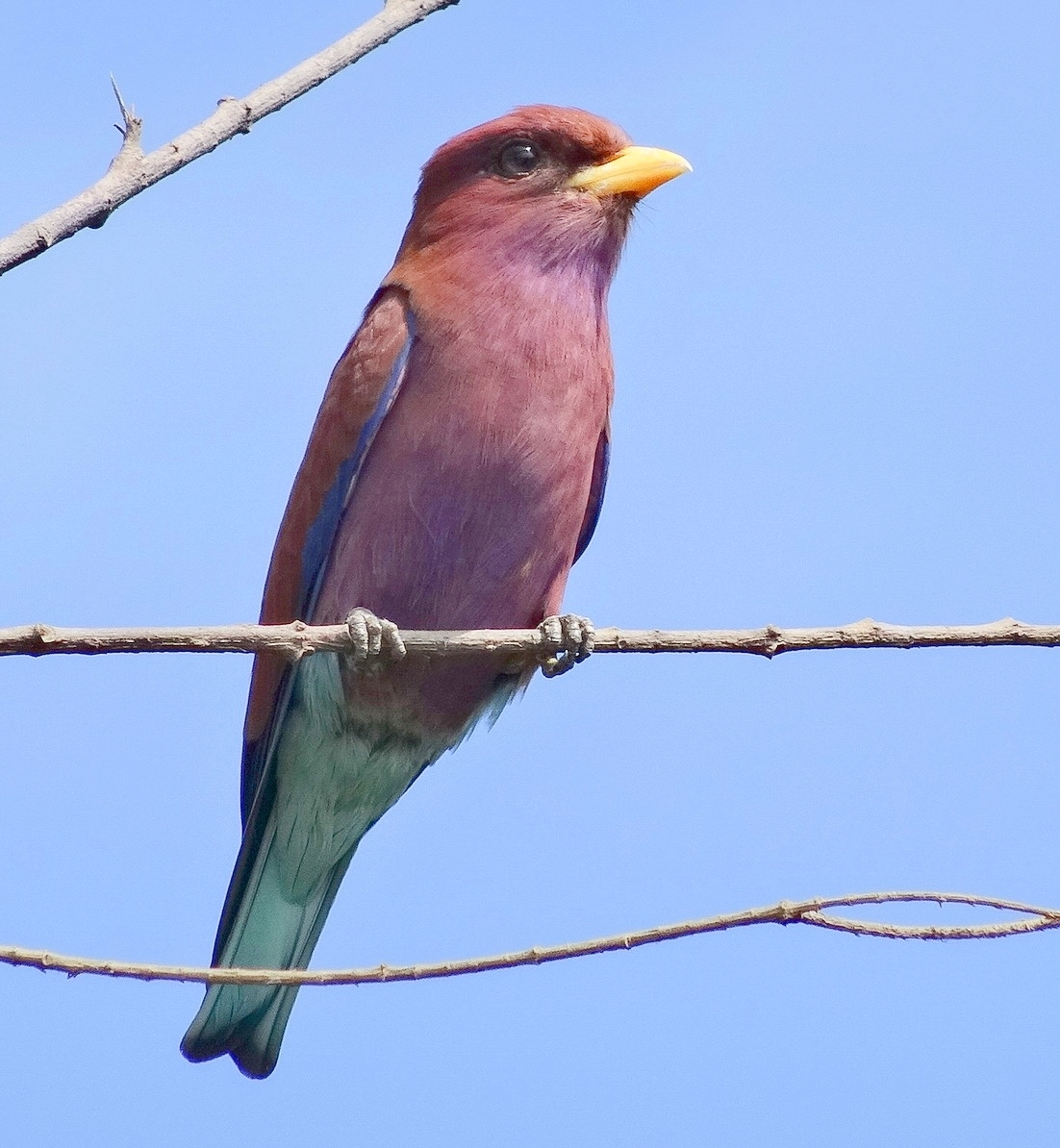
Broad-billed roller

Order: Coraciiformes Family: Coraciidae

Rollers resemble crows in size and build, but are more closely related to the kingfishers and bee-eaters. They share the colourful appearance of those groups with blues and browns predominating. The two inner front toes are connected, but the outer toe is not.

- European roller, Coracias garrulus
- Abyssinian roller, Coracias abyssinica
- Lilac-breasted roller, Coracias caudata
- Rufous-crowned roller, Coracias naevia
- Broad-billed roller, Eurystomus glaucurus
- Blue-throated roller, Eurystomus gularis

== African barbets ==
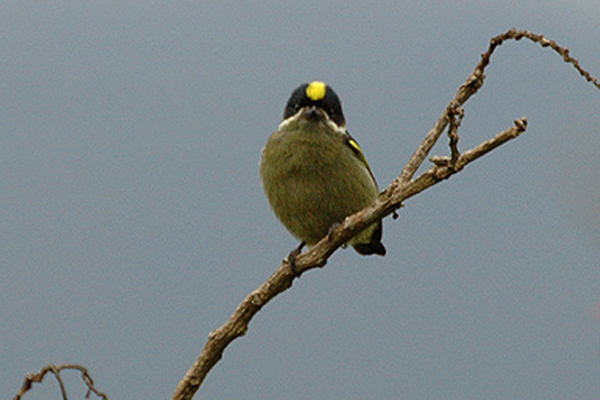
Western tinkerbird

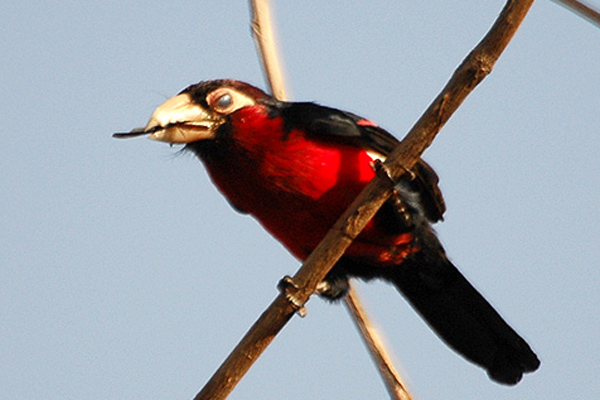
Double-toothed barbet at Entebbe, Uganda

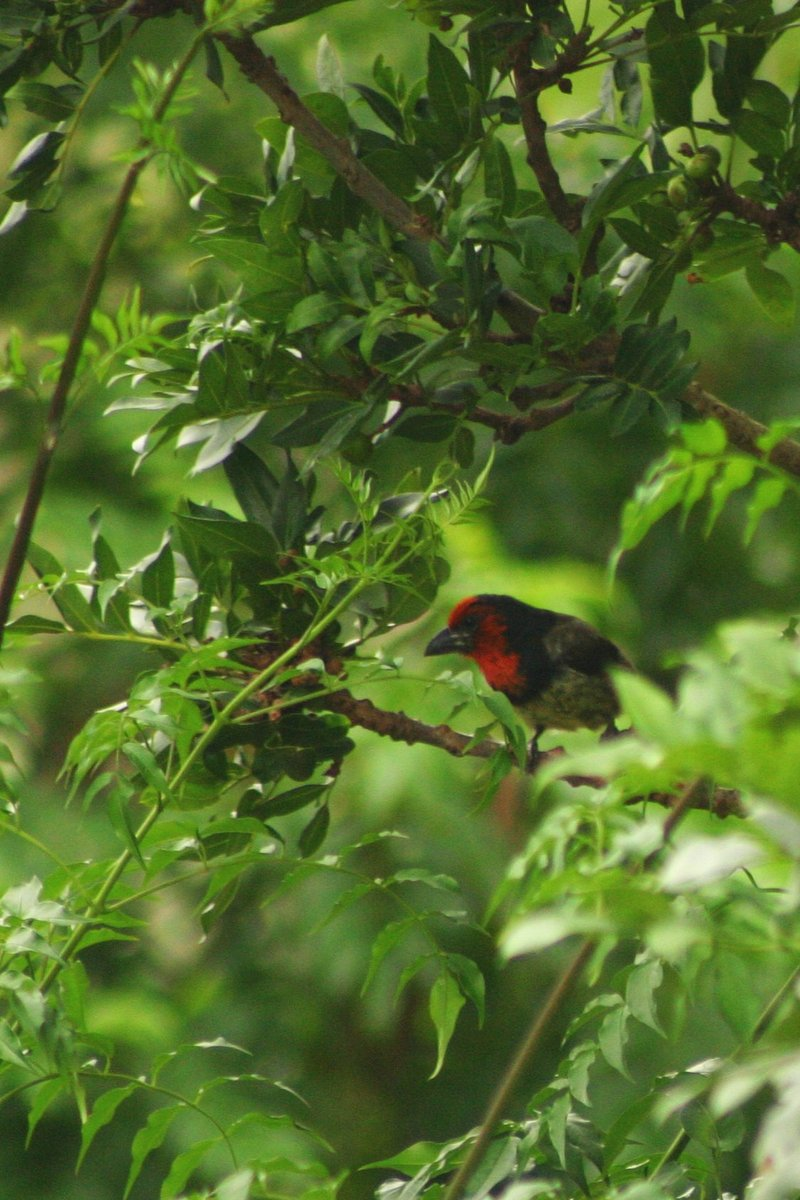
Black-collared barbet

Order: Piciformes Family: Lybiidae

The barbets are plump birds, with short necks and large heads. They get their name from the bristles which fringe their heavy bills. Most species are brightly coloured.

- Yellow-billed barbet, Trachyphonus purpuratus
- Crested barbet, Trachyphonus vaillantii
- Red-and-yellow barbet, Trachyphonus erythrocephalus
- D'Arnaud's barbet, Trachyphonus darnaudii
- Gray-throated barbet, Gymnobucco bonapartei
- Speckled tinkerbird, Pogoniulus scolopaceus
- Green tinkerbird, Pogoniulus simplex
- Moustached tinkerbird, Pogoniulus leucomystax
- Western tinkerbird, Pogoniulus coryphaea
- Red-rumped tinkerbird, Pogoniulus atroflavus
- Yellow-throated tinkerbird, Pogoniulus subsulphureus
- Yellow-rumped tinkerbird, Pogoniulus bilineatus
- Red-fronted tinkerbird, Pogoniulus pusillus
- Yellow-fronted tinkerbird, Pogoniulus chrysoconus
- Yellow-spotted barbet, Buccanodon duchaillui
- Hairy-breasted barbet, Tricholaema hirsuta
- Red-fronted barbet, Tricholaema diademata
- Spot-flanked barbet, Tricholaema lachrymosa
- Black-throated barbet, Tricholaema melanocephala
- White-headed barbet, Lybius leucocephalus
- Red-faced barbet, Lybius rubrifacies
- Black-billed barbet, Lybius guifsobalito
- Black-collared barbet, Lybius torquatus
- Double-toothed barbet, Lybius bidentatus
- Black-breasted barbet, Lybius rolleti

== Honeyguides ==
Order: Piciformes Family: Indicatoridae

Honeyguides are among the few birds that feed on wax. They are named for the greater honeyguide which leads traditional honey-hunters to bees' nests and, after the hunters have harvested the honey, feeds on the remaining contents of the hive.

- Cassin's honeyguide, Prodotiscus insignis
- Wahlberg's honeyguide, Prodotiscus regulus
- Zenker's honeyguide, Melignomon zenkeri
- Dwarf honeyguide, Indicator pumilio
- Willcock's honeyguide, Indicator willcocksi
- Pallid honeyguide, Indicator meliphilus
- Least honeyguide, Indicator exilis
- Lesser honeyguide, Indicator minor
- Spotted honeyguide, Indicator maculatus
- Scaly-throated honeyguide, Indicator variegatus
- Greater honeyguide, Indicator indicator
- Lyre-tailed honeyguide, Melichneutes robustus

== Woodpeckers ==
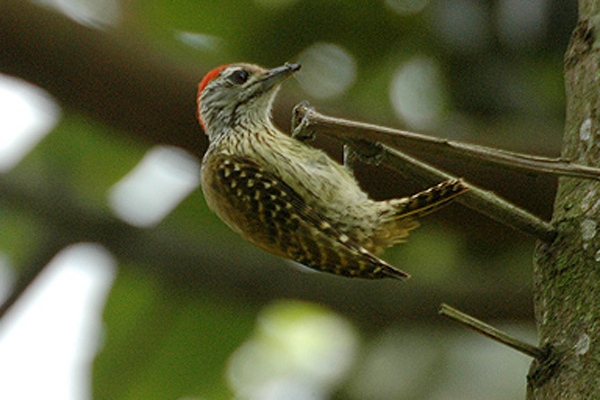
Cardinal woodpecker

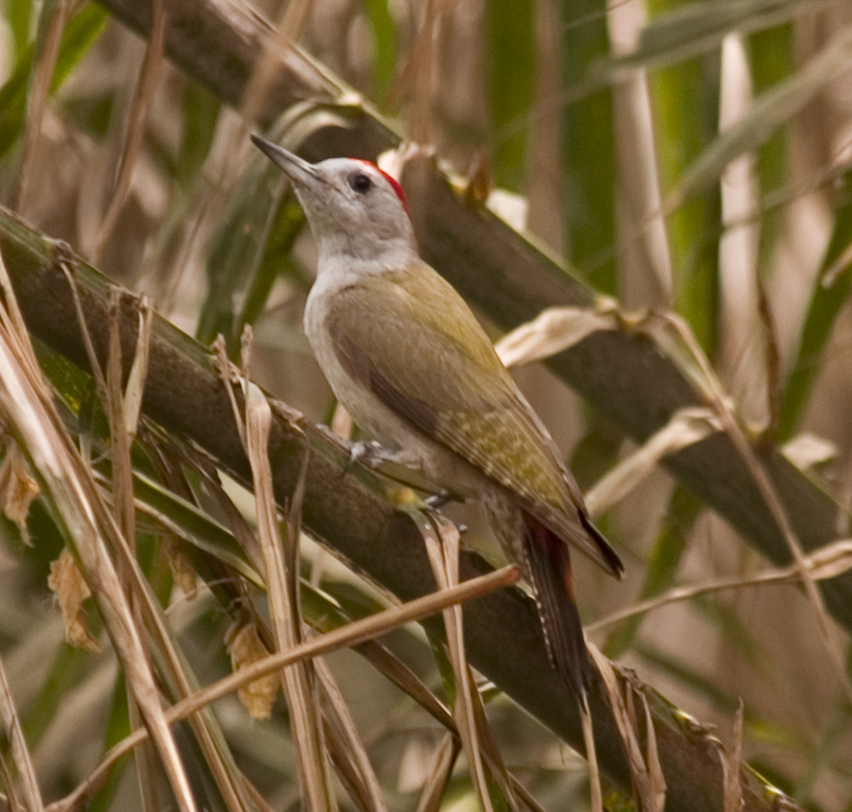
African gray woodpecker

Order: Piciformes Family: Picidae

Woodpeckers are small to medium-sized birds with chisel-like beaks, short legs, stiff tails, and long tongues used for capturing insects. Some species have feet with two toes pointing forward and two backward, while several species have only three toes. Many woodpeckers have the habit of tapping noisily on tree trunks with their beaks.

- Eurasian wryneck, Jynx torquilla
- Rufous-necked wryneck, Jynx ruficollis
- African piculet, Verreauxia africana
- Gabon woodpecker, Chloropicus gabonensis
- Elliot's woodpecker, Dendropicos elliotii
- Speckle-breasted woodpecker, Chloropicus poecilolaemus
- Cardinal woodpecker, Chloropicus fuscescens
- Bearded woodpecker, Chloropicus namaquus
- Golden-crowned woodpecker, Chloropicus xantholophus
- Brown-backed woodpecker, Chloropicus obsoletus
- African gray woodpecker, Chloropicus goertae
- Olive woodpecker, Chloropicus griseocephalus
- Brown-eared woodpecker, Campethera caroli
- Buff-spotted woodpecker, Campethera nivosa
- Tullberg's woodpecker, Campethera tullbergi
- Green-backed woodpecker, Campethera cailliautii
- Nubian woodpecker, Campethera nubica
- Golden-tailed woodpecker, Campethera abingoni

== Falcons and caracaras ==
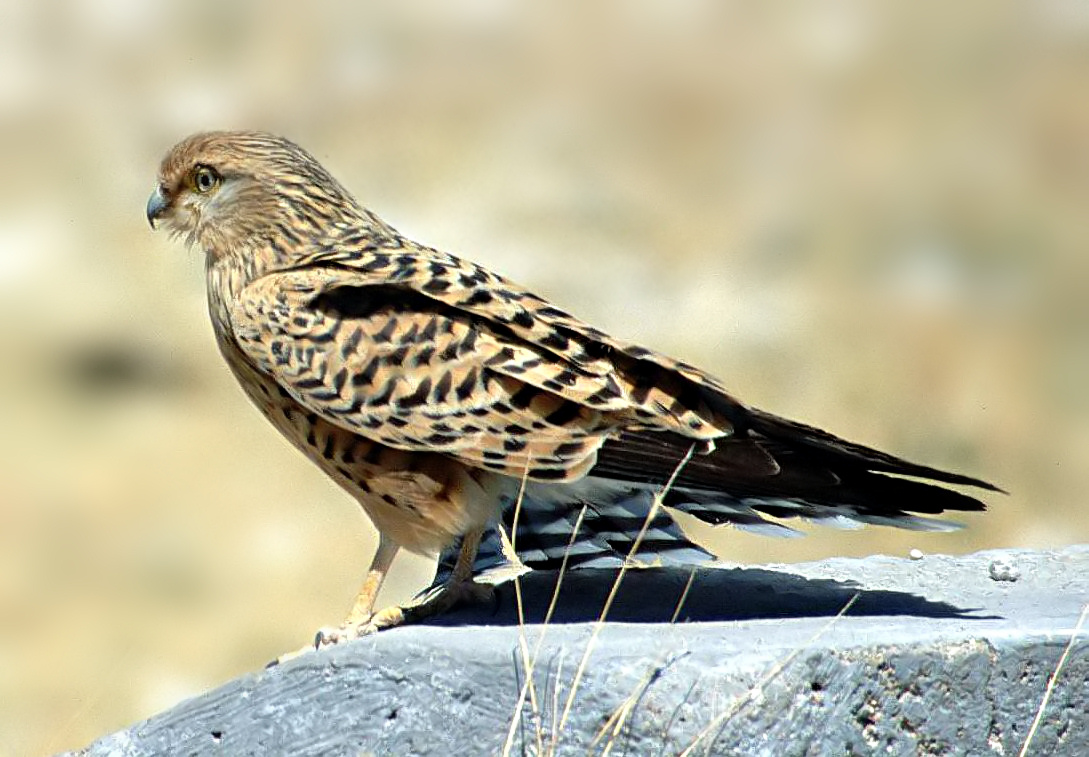
Greater kestrel

Order: Falconiformes Family: Falconidae

Falconidae is a family of diurnal birds of prey. They differ from hawks, eagles, and kites in that they kill with their beaks instead of their talons.

- Pygmy falcon, Polihierax semitorquatus
- Lesser kestrel, Falco naumanni
- Eurasian kestrel, Falco tinnunculus
- Greater kestrel, Falco rupicoloides (A)
- Fox kestrel, Falco alopex
- Gray kestrel, Falco ardosiaceus
- Dickinson's kestrel, Falco dickinsoni (A)
- Red-necked falcon, Falco chicquera
- Red-footed falcon, Falco vespertinus (A)
- Amur falcon, Falco amurensis
- Eleonora's falcon, Falco eleonorae
- Sooty falcon, Falco concolor (A)
- Eurasian hobby, Falco subbuteo
- African hobby, Falco cuvierii
- Lanner falcon, Falco biarmicus
- Saker falcon, Falco cherrug (A)
- Peregrine falcon, Falco peregrinus
- Taita falcon, Falco fasciinucha

== Old World parrots ==
Order: Psittaciformes Family: Psittaculidae

Characteristic features of parrots include a strong curved bill, an upright stance, strong legs, and clawed zygodactyl feet. Many parrots are vividly coloured, and some are multi-coloured. In size they range from 8 cm (3.1 in) to 1 m (3.3 ft) in length. Old World parrots are found from Africa east across south and southeast Asia and Oceania to Australia and New Zealand.

- Rose-ringed parakeet, Psittacula krameri
- Black-collared lovebird, Agapornis swinderniana
- Red-headed lovebird, Agapornis pullarius

== African and New World parrots ==
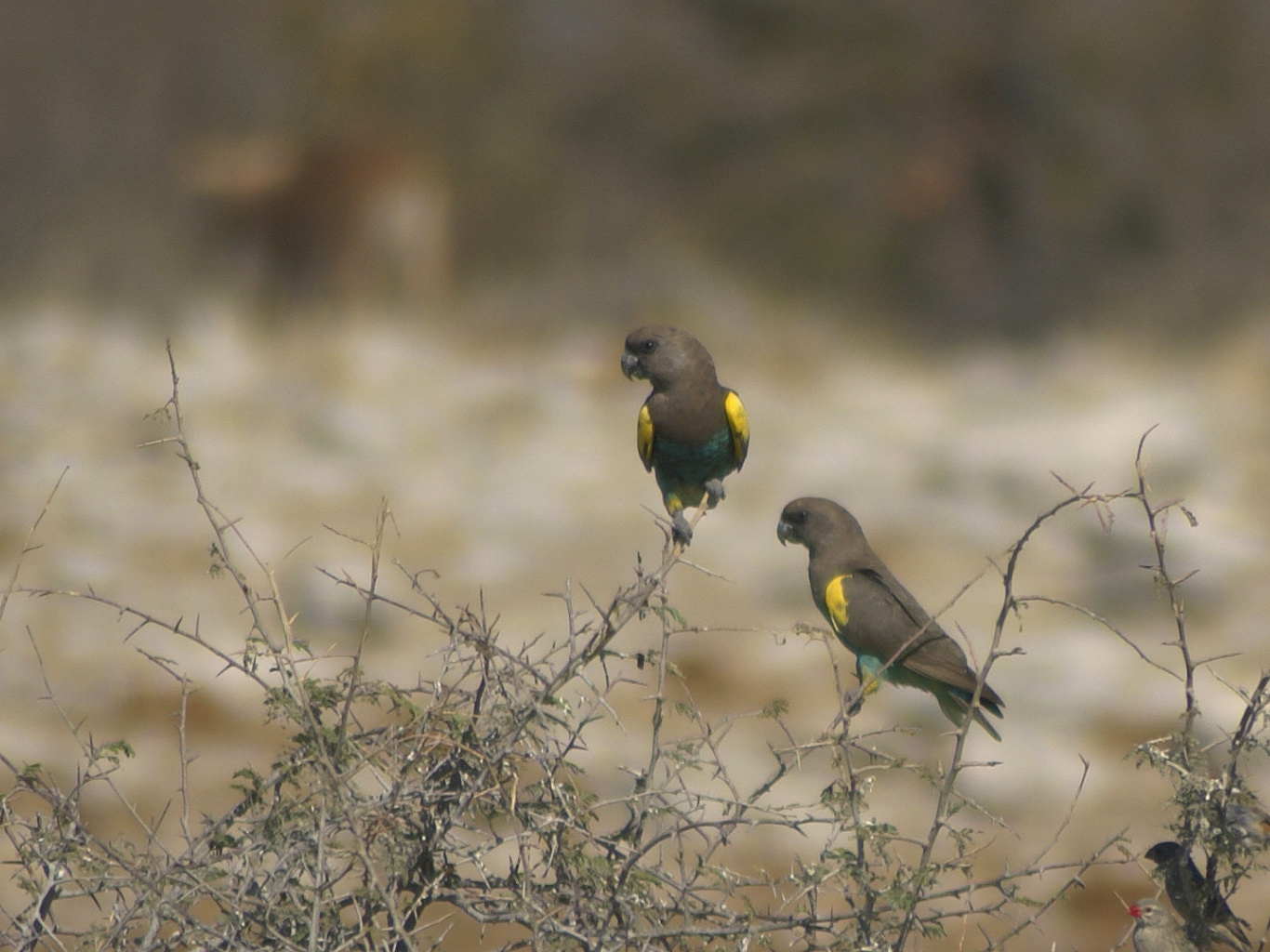
Meyer's parrot

Order: Psittaciformes Family: Psittacidae

Characteristic features of parrots include a strong curved bill, an upright stance, strong legs, and clawed zygodactyl feet. Many parrots are vividly coloured, and some are multi-coloured. In size they range from 8 cm (3.1 in) to 1 m (3.3 ft) in length. Most of the more than 150 species in this family are found in the New World.

- Gray parrot, Psittacus erithacus
- Brown-necked parrot, Poicephalus fuscicollis (A)
- Meyer's parrot, Poicephalus meyeri

== African and green broadbills ==
Order: Passeriformes Family: Calyptomenidae

The broadbills are small, brightly coloured birds which feed on fruit and also take insects in flycatcher fashion, snapping their broad bills. Their habitat is canopies of wet forests.

- African broadbill, Smithornis capensis
- Rufous-sided broadbill, Smithornis rufolateralis

== Asian and Grauer's broadbills ==
Order: Passeriformes Family: Eurylaimidae

Only one member of this small family is found in Africa, and its range is limited to Uganda and the Democratic Republic of Congo. It feeds mostly on fruits.

- Grauer's broadbill, Pseudocalyptomena graueri

== Pittas ==
Order: Passeriformes Family: Pittidae

Pittas are medium-sized by passerine standards and are stocky, with fairly long, strong legs, short tails, and stout bills. Many are brightly coloured. They spend the majority of their time on wet forest floors, eating snails, insects, and similar invertebrates.

- African pitta, Pitta angolensis
- Green-breasted pitta, Pitta reichenowi

== Cuckooshrikes ==
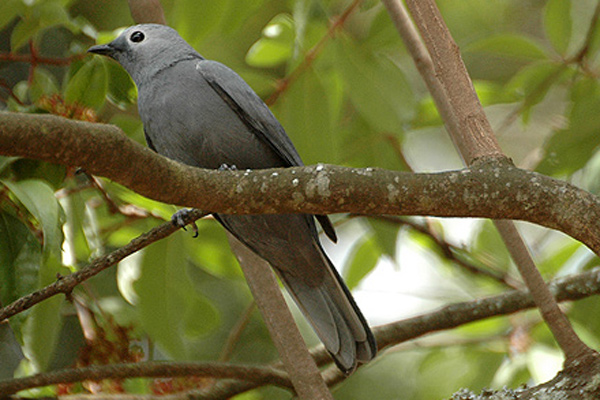
Gray cuckooshrike

Order: Passeriformes Family: Campephagidae

The cuckooshrikes are small to medium-sized passerine birds. They are predominantly greyish with white and black, although some species are brightly coloured.

- Gray cuckooshrike, Coracina caesia
- White-breasted cuckooshrike, Coracina pectoralis
- Black cuckooshrike, Campephaga flava
- Petit's cuckooshrike, Campephaga petiti
- Red-shouldered cuckooshrike, Campephaga phoenicea
- Purple-throated cuckooshrike, Campephaga quiscalina

== Old World orioles ==
Order: Passeriformes Family: Oriolidae

The Old World orioles are colourful passerine birds. They are not related to the New World orioles.

- Eurasian golden oriole, Oriolus oriolus
- African golden oriole, Oriolus auratus
- Western black-headed oriole, Oriolus brachyrynchus
- African black-headed oriole, Oriolus larvatus
- Black-tailed oriole, Oriolus percivali
- Black-winged oriole, Oriolus nigripennis

== Wattle-eyes and batises ==
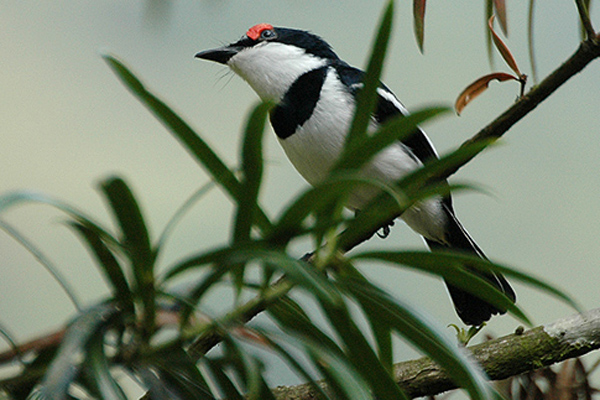
Male brown-throated wattle-eye at Bwindi, SW. Uganda

Order: Passeriformes Family: Platysteiridae

The wattle-eyes, or puffback flycatchers, are small stout passerine birds of the African tropics. They get their name from the brightly coloured fleshy eye decorations found in most species in this group.

- Brown-throated wattle-eye, Platysteira cyanea
- Black-throated wattle-eye, Platysteira peltata
- Chestnut wattle-eye, Platysteira castanea
- Jameson's wattle-eye, Platysteira jamesoni
- Yellow-bellied wattle-eye, Platysteira concreta
- Rwenzori batis, Batis diops
- Chinspot batis, Batis molitor
- Gray-headed batis, Batis orientalis
- Western black-headed batis, Batis erlangeri
- Pygmy batis, Batis perkeo
- Ituri batis, Batis ituriensis

== Vangas, helmetshrikes, and allies ==
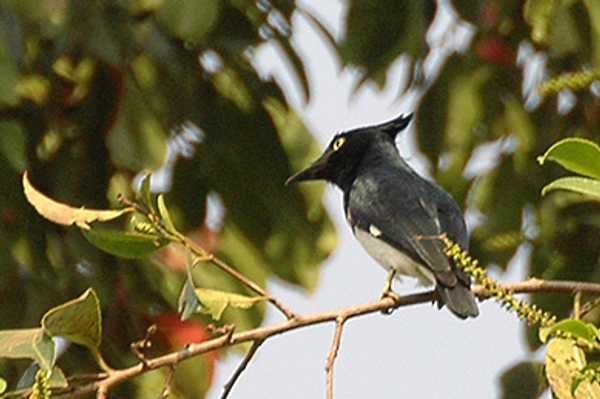
Black-and-white shrike-flycatcher

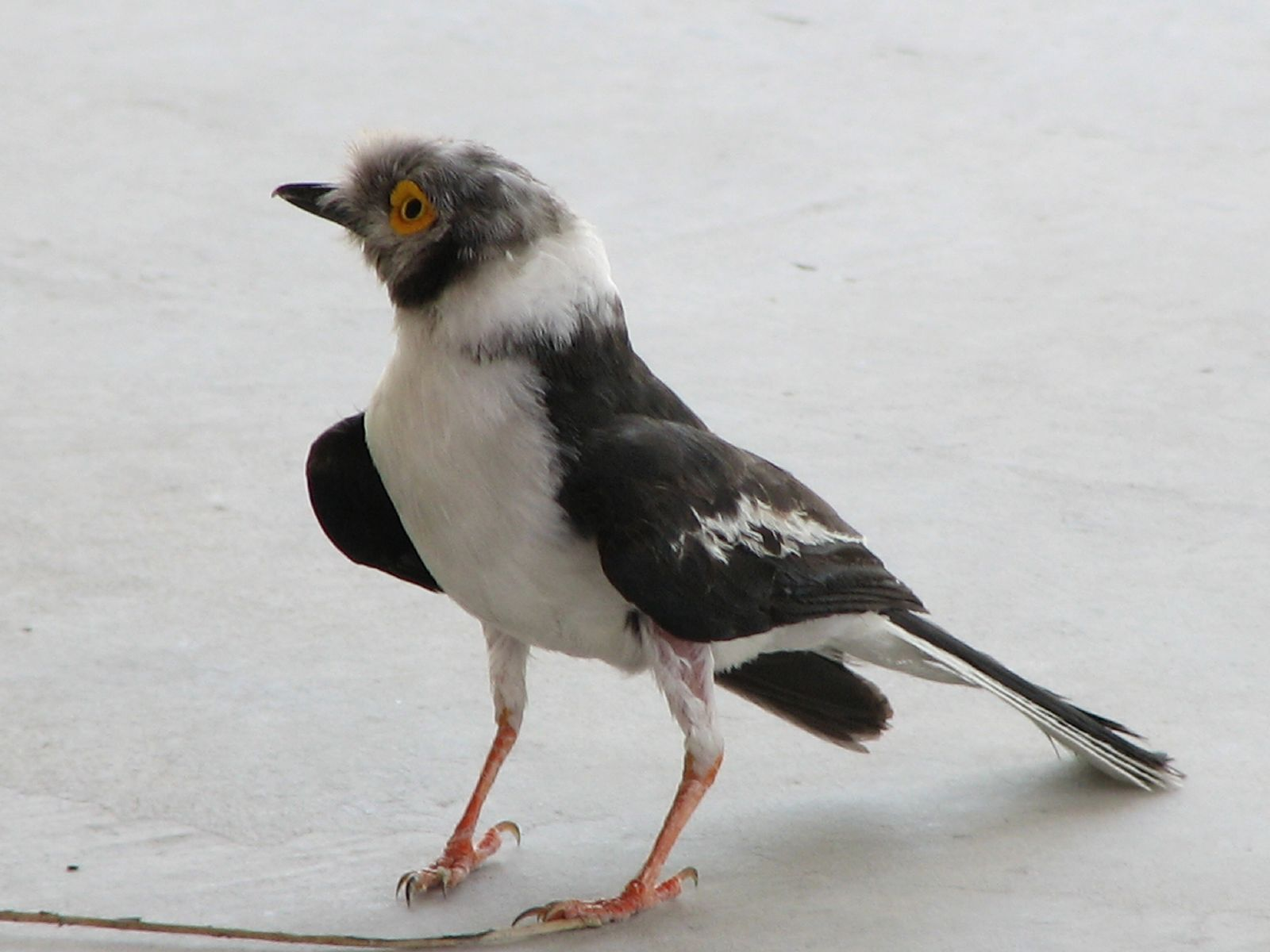
White helmetshrike

Order: Passeriformes Family: Vangidae

The helmetshrikes are similar in build to the shrikes, but tend to be colourful species with distinctive crests or other head ornaments, from which they get their name.

- White helmetshrike, Prionops plumatus
- Yellow-crested helmetshrike, Prionops alberti
- Red-billed helmetshrike, Prionops caniceps
- Rufous-bellied helmetshrike, Prionops rufiventris
- African shrike-flycatcher, Megabyas flammulatus
- Black-and-white shrike-flycatcher, Bias musicus

== Bushshrikes and allies ==
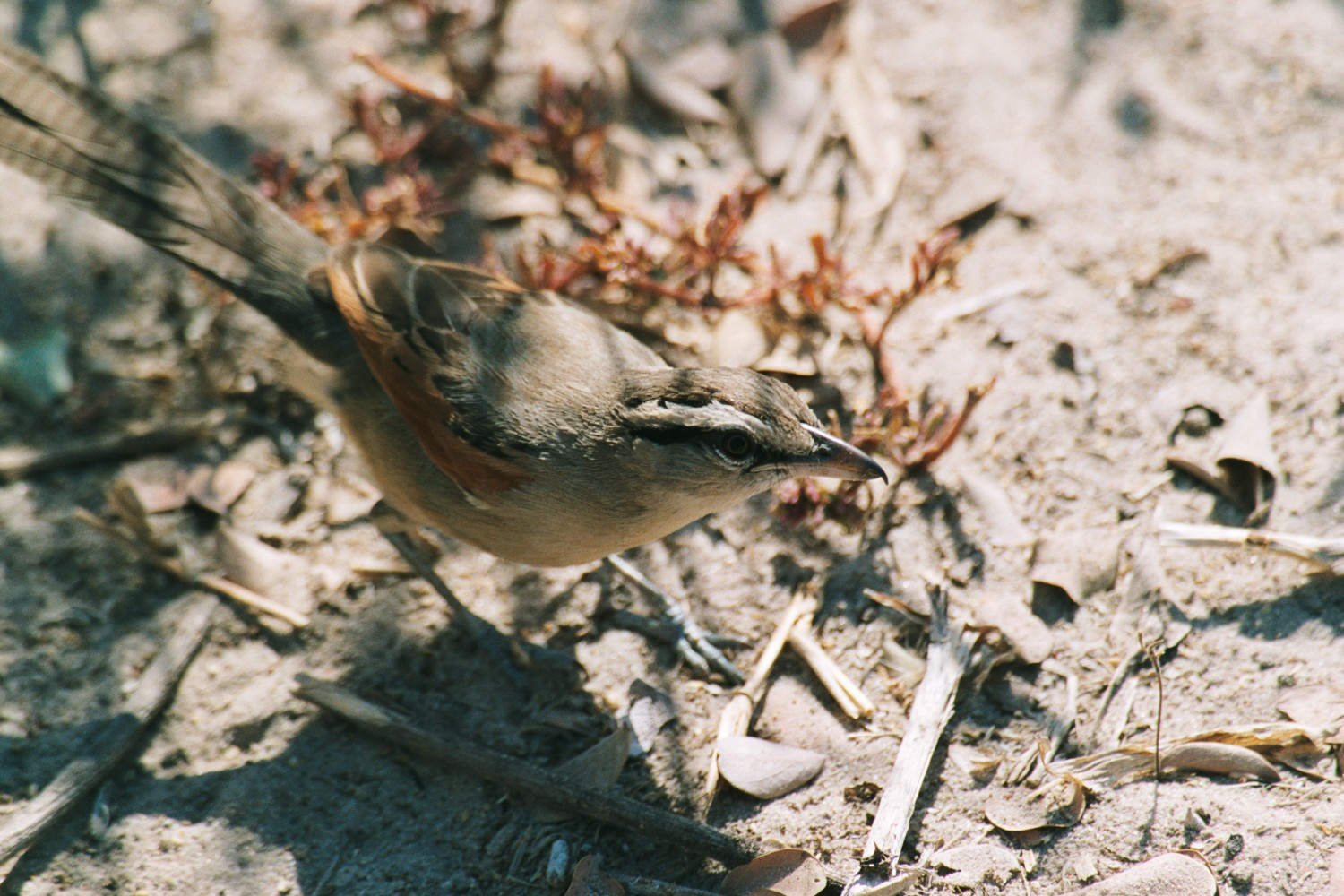
Brown-crowned tchagra

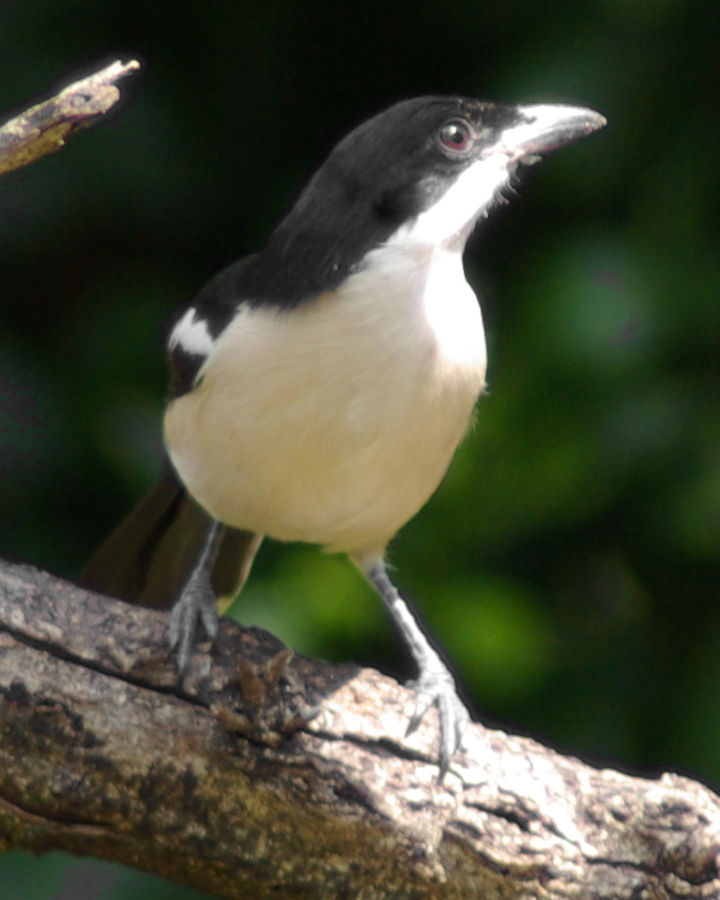
Tropical boubou

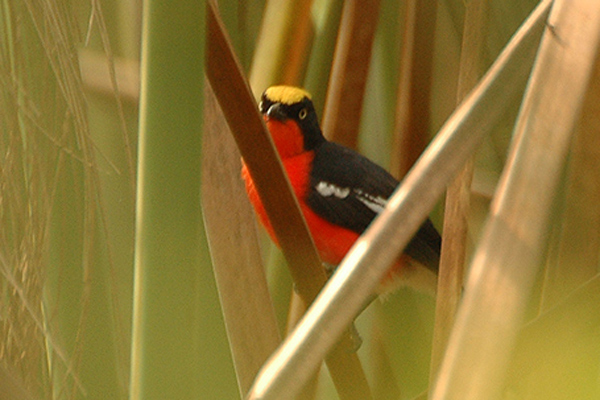
Papyrus gonolek

Order: Passeriformes Family: Malaconotidae

Bushshrikes are similar in habits to shrikes, hunting insects and other small prey from a perch on a bush. Although similar in build to the shrikes, these tend to be either colourful species or largely black; some species are quite secretive.

- Brubru, Nilaus afer
- Northern puffback, Dryoscopus gambensis
- Black-backed puffback, Dryoscopus cubla
- Red-eyed puffback, Dryoscopus senegalensis
- Pink-footed puffback, Dryoscopus angolensis
- Marsh tchagra, Tchagra minutus
- Black-crowned tchagra, Tchagra senegalus
- Brown-crowned tchagra, Tchagra australis
- Three-streaked tchagra, Tchagra jamesi
- Lühder's bushshrike, Laniarius luehderi
- Tropical boubou, Laniarius major
- Black-headed gonolek, Laniarius erythrogaster
- Papyrus gonolek, Laniarius mufumbiri
- Slate-coloured boubou, Laniarius funebris
- Lowland sooty boubou, Laniarius leucorhynchus
- Willard's sooty boubou, Laniarius willardi
- Albertine boubou, Laniarius holomelas
- Fülleborn's boubou, Laniarius fuelleborni
- Gray-green bushshrike, Telophorus bocagei
- Sulphur-breasted bushshrike, Telophorus sulfureopectus
- Many-colored bushshrike, Telophorus multicolor
- Doherty's bushshrike, Telophorus dohertyi
- Fiery-breasted bushshrike, Malaconotus cruentus
- Lagden's bushshrike, Malaconotus lagdeni
- Gray-headed bushshrike, Malaconotus blanchoti

== Drongos ==
Order: Passeriformes Family: Dicruridae

The drongos are mostly black or dark grey in colour, sometimes with metallic tints. They have long forked tails, and some Asian species have elaborate tail decorations. They have short legs and sit very upright when perched, like a shrike. They flycatch or take prey from the ground.

- Sharpe's drongo, Dicrurus sharpei
- Fork-tailed drongo, Dicrurus adsimilis
- Glossy-backed drongo, Dicrurus divaricatus
- Velvet-mantled drongo, Dicrurus modestus

== Monarch flycatchers ==
Order: Passeriformes Family: Monarchidae

The monarch flycatchers are small to medium-sized insectivorous passerines which hunt by flycatching.

- Blue-headed crested-flycatcher, Trochocercus nitens
- African crested-flycatcher, Trochocercus cyanomelas
- Black-headed paradise-flycatcher, Terpsiphone rufiventer
- African paradise-flycatcher, Terpsiphone viridis

== Shrikes ==
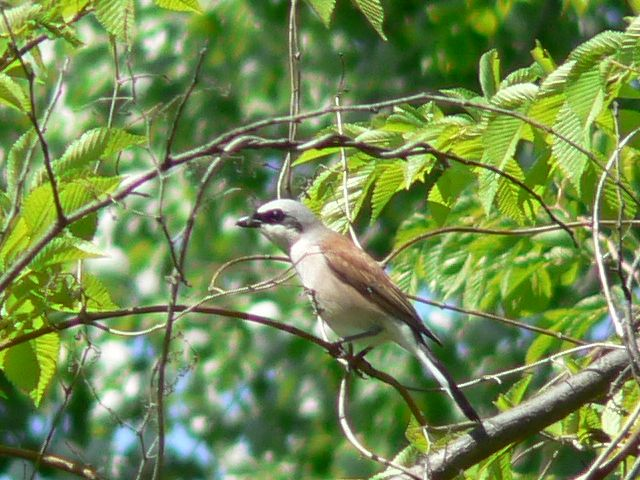
Red-backed shrike

Order: Passeriformes Family: Laniidae

Shrikes are passerine birds known for their habit of catching other birds and small animals and impaling the uneaten portions of their bodies on thorns. A shrike's beak is hooked, like that of a typical bird of prey.

- Red-backed shrike, Lanius collurio
- Red-tailed shrike, Lanius phoenicuroides
- Isabelline shrike, Lanius isabellinus
- Emin's shrike, Lanius gubernator
- Lesser gray shrike, Lanius minor
- Gray-backed fiscal, Lanius excubitoroides
- Yellow-billed shrike, Lanius corvinus
- Taita fiscal, Lanius dorsalis
- Mackinnon's shrike, Lanius mackinnoni
- Northern fiscal, Lanius humeralis
- Souza's shrike, Lanius souzae
- Masked shrike, Lanius nubicus (A)
- Woodchat shrike, Lanius senator
- White-rumped shrike, Eurocephalus ruppelli

== Crows, jays, and magpies ==
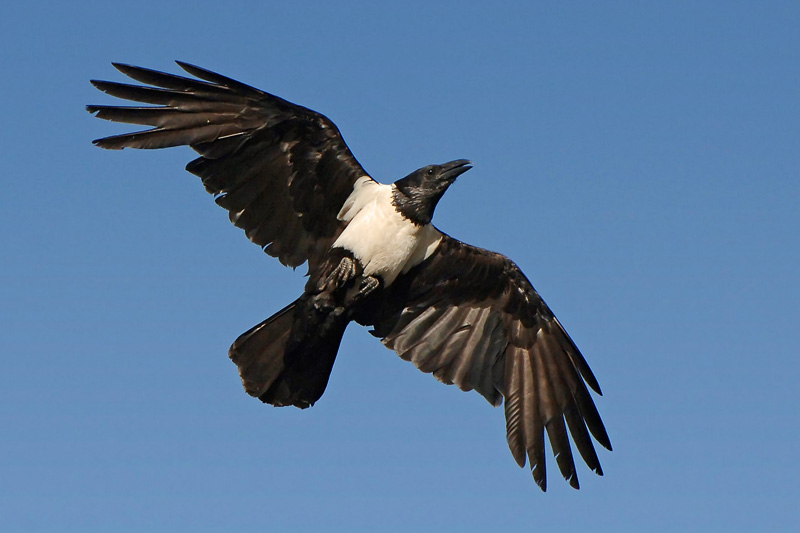
Pied crow

Order: Passeriformes Family: Corvidae

The family Corvidae includes crows, ravens, jays, choughs, magpies, treepies, nutcrackers, and ground jays. Corvids are above average in size among the Passeriformes, and some of the larger species show high levels of intelligence.

- Piapiac, Ptilostomus afer
- Pied crow, Corvus albus
- Somali crow, Corvus edithae
- Fan-tailed raven, Corvus rhipidurus
- White-necked raven, Corvus albicollis

== Hyliotas ==
Order: Passeriformes Family: Hyliotidae

The members of this small family, all of genus Hyliota, are birds of the forest canopy. They tend to feed in mixed-species flocks.

- Yellow-bellied hyliota, Hyliota flavigaster
- Southern hyliota, Hyliota australis

== Fairy flycatchers ==
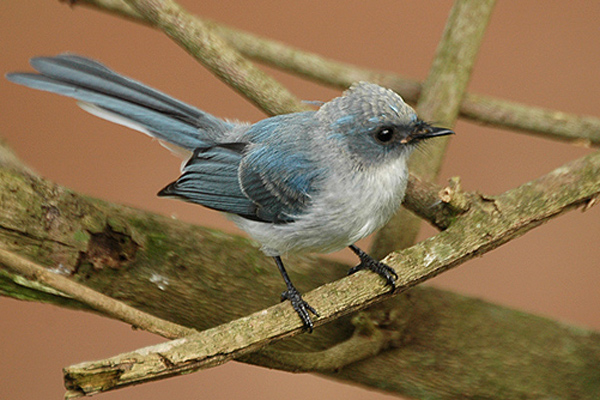
White-tailed blue flycatcher at Bwindi, SW Uganda

Order: Passeriformes Family: Stenostiridae

Most of the species of this small family are found in Africa, though a few inhabit tropical Asia. They are not closely related to other birds called "flycatchers".

- African blue flycatcher, Elminia longicauda
- White-tailed blue flycatcher, Elminia albicauda
- Dusky crested-flycatcher, Elminia nigromitrata
- White-bellied crested-flycatcher, Elminia albiventris
- White-tailed crested-flycatcher, Elminia albonotata

== Tits, chickadees, and titmice ==
Order: Passeriformes Family: Paridae

The Paridae are mainly small stocky woodland species with short stout bills. Some have crests. They are adaptable birds, with a mixed diet including seeds and insects.

- White-shouldered black-tit, Melaniparus guineensis
- White-winged black-tit, Parus leucomelas
- White-bellied tit, Melaniparus albiventris
- Dusky tit, Melaniparus funereus
- Stripe-breasted tit, Melaniparus fasciiventer
- Somali tit, Melaniparus thruppi

== Penduline-tits ==
Order: Passeriformes Family: Remizidae

The penduline-tits are a group of small passerine birds related to the true tits. They are insectivores.

- Mouse-colored penduline-tit, Anthoscopus musculus
- Yellow penduline-tit, Anthoscopus parvulus
- African penduline-tit, Anthoscopus caroli

== Larks ==
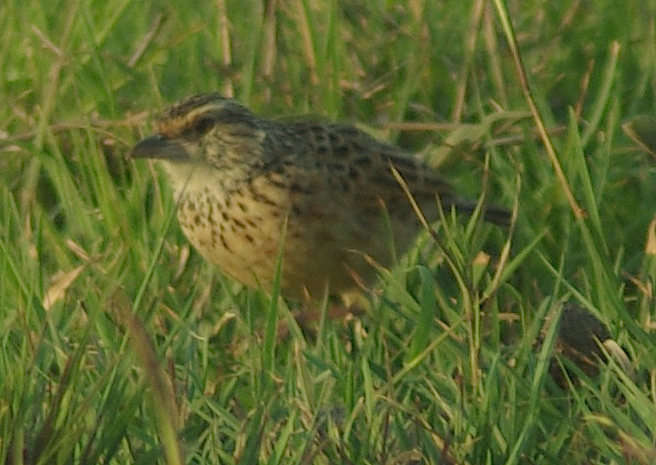
Rufous-naped lark

Order: Passeriformes Family: Alaudidae

Larks are small terrestrial birds with often extravagant songs and display flights. Most larks are fairly dull in appearance. Their food is insects and seeds.

- Rufous-rumped lark, Pinarocorys erythropygia
- Dusky lark, Pinarocorys nigricans (A)
- Chestnut-backed sparrow-lark, Eremopterix leucotis
- Fischer's sparrow-lark, Eremopterix leucopareia
- Pink-breasted lark, Calendulauda poecilosterna
- Fawn-colored lark, Calendulauda africanoides
- Red-winged lark, Mirafra hypermetra
- Rufous-naped lark, Mirafra africana
- Flappet lark, Mirafra rufocinnamomea
- White-tailed lark, Mirafra albicauda
- Singing bush lark, Mirafra javanica
- Red-capped lark, Calandrella cinerea
- Sun lark, Galerida modesta

== Nicators ==
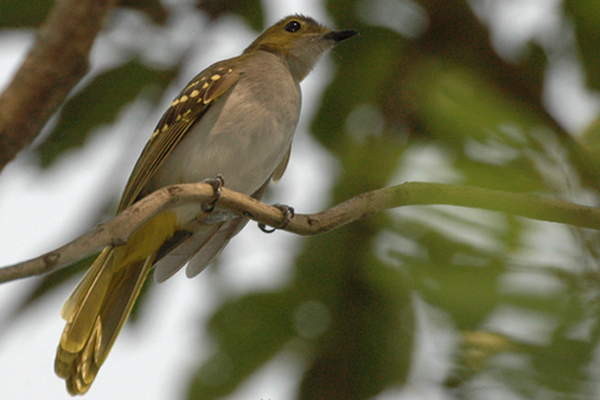
Western nicator

Order: Passeriformes Family: Nicatoridae

The nicators are shrike-like, with hooked bills. They are endemic to sub-Saharan Africa.

- Western nicator, Nicator chloris
- Yellow-throated nicator, Nicator vireo

== African warblers ==
Order: Passeriformes Family: Macrosphenidae

African warblers are small to medium-sized insectivores which are found in a wide variety of habitats south of the Sahara.

- Green crombec, Sylvietta virens
- Lemon-bellied crombec, Sylvietta denti
- White-browed crombec, Sylvietta leucophrys
- Northern crombec, Sylvietta brachyura
- Red-faced crombec, Sylvietta whytii
- Moustached grass-warbler, Melocichla mentalis
- Yellow longbill, Macrosphenus flavicans
- Gray longbill, Macrosphenus concolor
- Grauer's warbler, Graueria vittata
- Green hylia, Hylia prasina
- Tit-hylia, Pholidornis rushiae

== Cisticolas and allies ==
Order: Passeriformes Family: Cisticolidae

The Cisticolidae are warblers found mainly in warmer southern regions of the Old World. They are generally very small birds of drab brown or grey appearance found in open country such as grassland or scrub.

- Yellow-vented eremomela, Eremomela flavicrissalis
- Yellow-bellied eremomela, Eremomela icteropygialis
- Green-backed eremomela, Eremomela canescens
- Greencap eremomela, Eremomela scotops
- Rufous-crowned eremomela, Eremomela badiceps
- Turner's eremomela, Eremomela turneri
- Red-winged gray warbler, Drymocichla incana
- White-chinned prinia, Schistolais leucopogon
- Black-collared apalis, Oreolais pulcher
- Rwenzori apalis, Oreolais ruwenzorii
- Miombo wren-warbler, Calamonastes undosus (A)
- Gray wren-warbler, Calamonastes simplex
- Green-backed camaroptera, Camaroptera brachyura
- Yellow-browed camaroptera, Camaroptera superciliaris
- Olive-green camaroptera, Camaroptera chloronota
- Cricket longtail, Spiloptila clamans
- Buff-bellied warbler, Phyllolais pulchella
- Black-capped apalis, Apalis nigriceps
- Black-throated apalis, Apalis jacksoni
- Masked apalis, Apalis binotata
- Black-faced apalis, Apalis personata
- Yellow-breasted apalis, Apalis flavida
- Buff-throated apalis, Apalis rufogularis
- Chestnut-throated apalis, Apalis porphyrolaema
- Gray apalis, Apalis cinerea
- Karamoja apalis, Apalis karamojae
- Tawny-flanked prinia, Prinia subflava
- Pale prinia, Prinia somalica
- Banded prinia, Prinia bairdii
- Red-winged prinia, Prinia erythroptera
- Red-fronted prinia, Prinia rufifrons
- Black-faced rufous-warbler, Bathmocercus rufus
- Gray-capped warbler, Eminia lepida
- Red-faced cisticola, Cisticola erythrops
- Singing cisticola, Cisticola cantans
- Whistling cisticola, Cisticola lateralis
- Trilling cisticola, Cisticola woosnami
- Chubb's cisticola, Cisticola chubbi
- Hunter's cisticola, Cisticola hunteri
- Rock-loving cisticola, Cisticola aberrans
- Boran cisticola, Cisticola bodessa (A)
- Rattling cisticola, Cisticola chiniana
- Red-pate cisticola, Cisticola ruficeps
- Wailing cisticola, Cisticola lais
- Winding cisticola, Cisticola galactotes
- Carruthers's cisticola, Cisticola carruthersi
- Stout cisticola, Cisticola robustus
- Croaking cisticola, Cisticola natalensis
- Tabora cisticola, Cisticola angusticauda
- Siffling cisticola, Cisticola brachypterus
- Foxy cisticola, Cisticola troglodytes
- Tiny cisticola, Cisticola nana (A)
- Zitting cisticola, Cisticola juncidis
- Desert cisticola, Cisticola aridulus (A)
- Black-backed cisticola, Cisticola eximius
- Wing-snapping cisticola, Cisticola ayresii

== Reed warblers and allies ==
Order: Passeriformes Family: Acrocephalidae

The members of this family are usually rather large for "warblers". Most are rather plain olivaceous brown above with much yellow to beige below. They are usually found in open woodland, reedbeds, or tall grass. The family occurs mostly in southern to western Eurasia and surroundings, but it also ranges far into the Pacific, with some species in Africa.

- Papyrus yellow-warbler, Calamonastides gracilirostris
- Eastern olivaceous warbler, Iduna pallida
- African yellow-warbler, Iduna natalensis
- Mountain yellow-warbler, Iduna similis
- Upcher's warbler, Hippolais languida
- Icterine warbler, Hippolais icterina
- Sedge warbler, Acrocephalus schoenobaenus
- Marsh warbler, Acrocephalus palustris
- Common reed warbler, Acrocephalus scirpaceus
- Basra reed warbler, Acrocephalus griseldis (A)
- Lesser swamp warbler, Acrocephalus gracilirostris
- Greater swamp warbler, Acrocephalus rufescens
- Great reed warbler, Acrocephalus arundinaceus

== Grassbirds and allies ==
Order: Passeriformes Family: Locustellidae

Locustellidae are a family of small insectivorous songbirds found mainly in Eurasia, Africa, and the Australian region. They are smallish birds with tails that are usually long and pointed, and tend to be drab brownish or buffy all over.

- Bamboo warbler, Locustella alfredi
- River warbler, Locustella fluviatilis (A)
- Fan-tailed grassbird, Catriscus brevirostris
- Evergreen-forest warbler, Bradypterus lopezi
- Cinnamon bracken-warbler, Bradypterus cinnamomeus
- White-winged swamp warbler, Bradypterus carpalis
- Grauer's swamp warbler, Bradypterus graueri
- Highland rush warbler, Bradypterus centralis

== Swallows ==
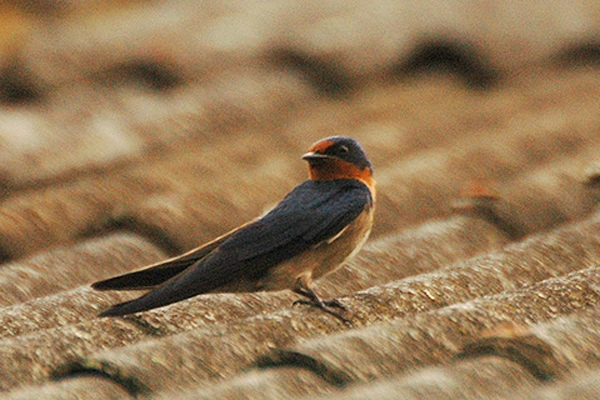
Angola swallow at Queen Elizabeth NP, Uganda

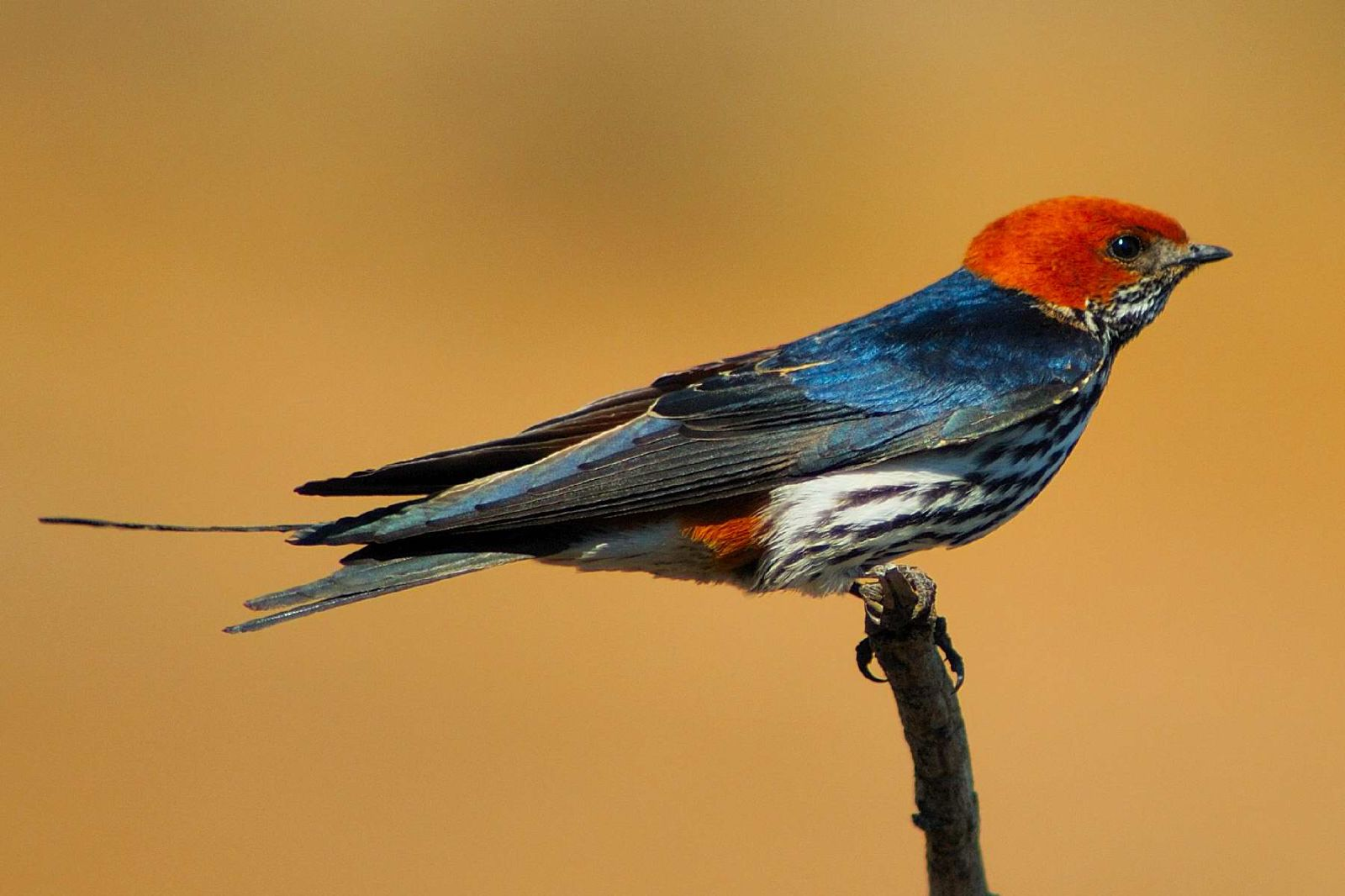
Lesser striped-swallow

Order: Passeriformes Family: Hirundinidae

The family Hirundinidae is adapted to aerial feeding. They have a slender streamlined body, long pointed wings, and a short bill with a wide gape. The feet are adapted to perching rather than walking, and the front toes are partially joined at the base.

- Plain martin, Riparia paludicola
- Bank swallow, Riparia riparia
- Banded martin, Neophedina cincta
- Rock martin, Ptyonoprogne fuligula
- Barn swallow, Hirundo rustica
- Ethiopian swallow, Hirundo aethiopica
- Angola swallow, Hirundo angolensis
- White-throated blue swallow, Hirundo nigrita
- Wire-tailed swallow, Hirundo smithii
- Montane blue swallow, Hirundo atrocaerulea
- Red-rumped swallow, Cecropis daurica
- Lesser striped swallow, Cecropis abyssinica
- Rufous-chested swallow, Cecropis semirufa
- Mosque swallow, Cecropis senegalensis
- Common house-martin, Delichon urbicum
- White-headed sawwing, Psalidoprocne albiceps
- Black sawwing, Psalidoprocne pristoptera
- Gray-rumped swallow, Pseudhirundo griseopyga

== Bulbuls ==
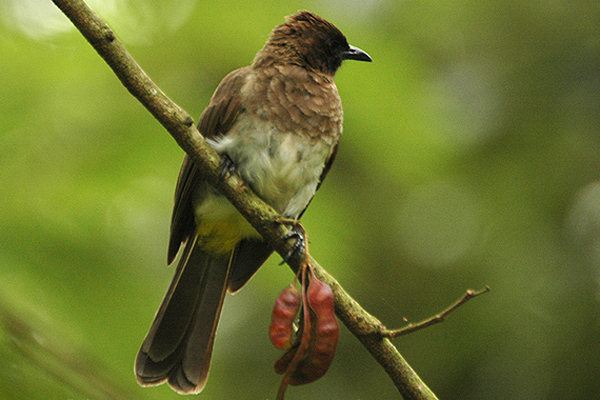
Common bulbul at Bwindi NP, Uganda

Order: Passeriformes Family: Pycnonotidae

Bulbuls are medium-sized songbirds. Some are colourful with yellow, red, or orange vents, cheeks, throats or supercilia, but most are drab, with uniform olive-brown to black plumage. Some species have distinct crests.

- Slender-billed greenbul, Stelgidillas gracilirostris
- Red-tailed bristlebill, Bleda syndactylus
- Lesser bristlebill, Bleda notatus
- Shelley's greenbul, Arizelocichla masukuensis
- Eastern mountain greenbul, Arizelocichla nigriceps
- Simple greenbul, Chlorocichla simplex
- Joyful greenbul, Chlorocichla laetissima
- Honeyguide greenbul, Baeopogon indicator
- Yellow-throated greenbul, Atimastillas flavicollis
- Spotted greenbul, Ixonotus guttatus
- Swamp greenbul, Thescelocichla leucopleura
- Red-tailed greenbul, Criniger calurus
- Eastern bearded-greenbul, Criniger chloronotus
- Gray greenbul, Eurillas gracilis
- Ansorge's greenbul, Eurillas ansorgei (A)
- Plain greenbul, Eurillas curvirostris
- Yellow-whiskered bulbul, Eurillas latirostris
- Little greenbul, Eurillas virens
- Leaf-love, Phyllastrephus scandens
- Northern brownbul, Phyllastrephus strepitans
- Toro olive-greenbul, Phyllastrephus hypochloris
- Cabanis's greenbul, Phyllastrephus cabanisi
- Icterine greenbul, Phyllastrephus icterinus
- Sassi's greenbul, Phyllastrephus lorenzi (A)
- Xavier's greenbul, Phyllastrephus xavieri
- White-throated greenbul, Phyllastrephus albigularis
- Yellow-streaked greenbul, Phyllastrephus flavostriatus
- Common bulbul, Pycnonotus barbatus

== Leaf warblers ==
Order: Passeriformes Family: Phylloscopidae

Leaf warblers are a family of small insectivorous birds found mostly in Eurasia and ranging into Wallacea and Africa. The species are of various sizes, often green-plumaged above and yellow below, or more subdued with greyish-green to greyish-brown colours.

- Wood warbler, Phylloscopus sibilatrix
- Willow warbler, Phylloscopus trochilus
- Common chiffchaff, Phylloscopus collybita
- Brown woodland-warbler, Phylloscopus umbrovirens
- Red-faced woodland-warbler, Phylloscopus laetus
- Uganda woodland-warbler, Phylloscopus budongoensis

== Bush warblers and allies ==
Order: Passeriformes Family: Scotocercidae

The members of this family are found throughout Africa, Asia, and Polynesia. Their taxonomy is in flux, and some authorities place genus Erythrocerus in another family.

- Chestnut-capped flycatcher, Erythrocercus mccallii
- Neumann's warbler, Urosphena neumanni

== Sylviid warblers, parrotbills, and allies ==
Order: Passeriformes Family: Sylviidae

The family Sylviidae is a group of small insectivorous passerine birds. They mainly occur as breeding species, as the common name implies, in Europe, Asia and, to a lesser extent, Africa. Most are of generally undistinguished appearance, but many have distinctive songs.

- Eurasian blackcap, Sylvia atricapilla
- Garden warbler, Sylvia borin
- African hill babbler, Sylvia abyssinica
- Rwenzori hill babbler, Sylvia atriceps
- Barred warbler, Curruca nisoria
- Brown parisoma, Curruca lugens
- Greater whitethroat, Curruca communis

== White-eyes, yuhinas, and allies ==
Order: Passeriformes Family: Zosteropidae

The white-eyes are small and mostly undistinguished, their plumage above being generally some dull colour like greenish-olive, but some species have a white or bright yellow throat, breast, or lower parts, and several have buff flanks. As their name suggests, many species have a white ring around each eye.

- Green white-eye, Zosterops stuhlmanni
- Northern yellow white-eye, Zosterops senegalensis
- Southern yellow white-eye, Zosterops anderssoni

== Ground babblers and allies ==
Order: Passeriformes Family: Pellorneidae

These small to medium-sized songbirds have soft fluffy plumage but are otherwise rather diverse. Members of the genus Illadopsis are found in forests, but some other genera are birds of scrublands.

- Brown illadopsis, Illadopsis fulvescens
- Pale-breasted illadopsis, Illadopsis rufipennis
- Mountain illadopsis, Illadopsis pyrrhoptera
- Scaly-breasted illadopsis, Illadopsis albipectus
- Puvel's illadopsis, Illadopsis puveli

== Laughingthrushes and allies ==
Order: Passeriformes Family: Leiothrichidae

The members of this family are diverse in size and colouration, though those of genus Turdoides tend to be brown or greyish. The family is found in Africa, India, and southeast Asia.

- Rufous chatterer, Argya rubiginosa
- Capuchin babbler, Turdoides atripennis
- Red-collared mountain-babbler, Turdoides rufocinctus
- Brown babbler, Turdoides plebejus
- Arrow-marked babbler, Turdoides jardineii
- Dusky babbler, Turdoides tenebrosa
- Black-lored babbler, Turdoides sharpei

== Treecreepers ==
Order: Passeriformes Family: Certhiidae

Treecreepers are small woodland birds, brown above and white below. They have thin pointed down-curved bills, which they use to extricate insects from bark. They have stiff tail feathers, like woodpeckers, which they use to support themselves on vertical trees.

- African spotted creeper, Salpornis salvadori

== Oxpeckers ==
Order: Passeriformes Family: Buphagidae

As both the English and scientific names of these birds imply, they feed on ectoparasites, primarily ticks, found on large mammals.

- Red-billed oxpecker, Buphagus erythrorynchus
- Yellow-billed oxpecker, Buphagus africanus

== Starlings ==
Order: Passeriformes Family: Sturnidae

Starlings are small to medium-sized passerine birds. Their flight is strong and direct and they are very gregarious. Their preferred habitat is fairly open country. They eat insects and fruit. Plumage is typically dark with a metallic sheen.

- Wattled starling, Creatophora cinerea
- Violet-backed starling, Cinnyricinclus leucogaster
- Slender-billed starling, Onychognathus tenuirostris
- Neumann's starling, Onychognathus neumanni
- Red-winged starling, Onychognathus morio
- Chestnut-winged starling, Onychognathus fulgidus
- Waller's starling, Onychognathus walleri
- Bristle-crowned starling, Onychognathus salvadorii
- Magpie starling, Speculipastor bicolor (A)
- Sharpe's starling, Poeoptera sharpii
- Narrow-tailed starling, Poeoptera lugubris
- Stuhlmann's starling, Poeoptera stuhlmanni
- Purple-headed starling, Hylopsar purpureiceps
- Rüppell's starling, Lamprotornis purpuropterus
- Splendid starling, Lamprotornis splendidus
- Superb starling, Lamprotornis superbus
- Lesser blue-eared starling, Lamprotornis chloropterus
- Greater blue-eared starling, Lamprotornis chalybaeus
- Purple starling, Lamprotornis purpureus
- Bronze-tailed starling, Lamprotornis chalcurus

== Thrushes and allies ==
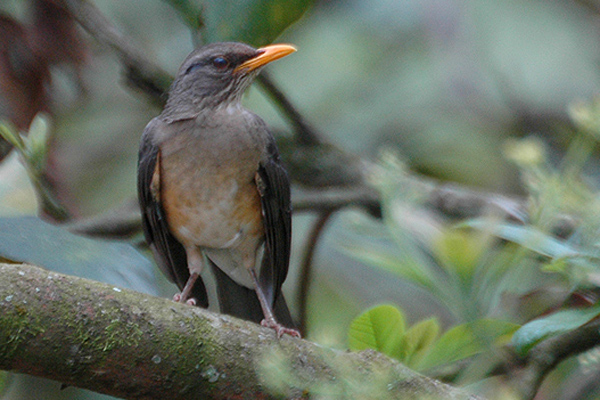
African thrush

Order: Passeriformes Family: Turdidae

The thrushes are a group of passerine birds that occur mainly in the Old World. They are plump, soft plumaged, small to medium-sized insectivores or sometimes omnivores, often feeding on the ground. Many have attractive songs.

- Rufous flycatcher-thrush, Neocossyphus fraseri
- Red-tailed ant-thrush, Neocossyphus rufus
- White-tailed ant-thrush, Neocossyphus poensis
- Black-eared ground-thrush, Geokichla camaronensis
- Gray ground-thrush, Geokichla princei
- Oberländer's ground-thrush, Geokichla oberlaenderi
- Abyssinian ground-thrush, Geokichla piaggiae
- Abyssinian thrush, Turdus abyssinicus
- African thrush, Turdus pelios

== Old World flycatchers ==
Order: Passeriformes Family: Muscicapidae

Old World flycatchers are a large group of small passerine birds native to the Old World. They are mainly small arboreal insectivores. The appearance of these birds is highly varied, but they mostly have weak songs and harsh calls.

- African dusky flycatcher, Muscicapa adusta
- Yellow-footed flycatcher, Muscicapa sethsmithi
- Spotted flycatcher, Muscicapa striata
- Gambaga flycatcher, Muscicapa gambagae (A)
- Swamp flycatcher, Muscicapa aquatica
- Cassin's flycatcher, Muscicapa cassini
- Sooty flycatcher, Bradornis infuscata
- Dusky-blue flycatcher, Bradornis comitatus
- African gray flycatcher, Bradornis microrhynchus
- Pale flycatcher, Agricola pallidus
- African forest-flycatcher, Fraseria ocreata
- Gray-throated tit-flycatcher, Fraseria griseigularis
- Gray tit-flycatcher, Fraseria plumbea
- Chapin's flycatcher, Fraseria lendu
- Ashy flycatcher, Fraseria caerulescens
- Silverbird, Empidornis semipartitus
- Yellow-eyed black-flycatcher, Melaenornis ardesiacus
- Northern black-flycatcher, Melaenornis edolioides
- Southern black-flycatcher, Melaenornis pammelaina
- White-eyed slaty-flycatcher, Melaenornis fischeri
- Fire-crested alethe, Alethe diademata
- Forest scrub-robin, Cercotrichas leucosticta
- Rufous-tailed scrub-robin, Cercotrichas galactotes (A)
- Brown-backed scrub-robin, Cercotrichas hartlaubi
- Red-backed scrub-robin, Cercotrichas leucophrys
- White-bellied robin-chat, Cossyphicula roberti
- Archer's robin-chat, Cossypha archeri
- Cape robin-chat, Cossypha caffra
- Blue-shouldered robin-chat, Cossypha cyanocampter
- Gray-winged robin-chat, Cossypha polioptera
- White-browed robin-chat, Cossypha heuglini
- Red-capped robin-chat, Cossypha natalensis
- Snowy-crowned robin-chat, Cossypha niveicapilla
- Collared palm-thrush, Cichladusa arquata
- Spotted morning-thrush, Cichladusa guttata
- White-starred robin, Pogonocichla stellata
- Brown-chested alethe, Chamaetylas poliocephala
- Red-throated alethe, Chamaetylas poliophrys
- Yellow-breasted forest robin, Stiphrornis mabirae
- Lowland akalat, Sheppardia cyornithopsis
- Equatorial akalat, Sheppardia aequatorialis
- White-throated robin, Irania gutturalis (A)
- Thrush nightingale, Luscinia luscinia (A)
- Common nightingale, Luscinia megarhynchos
- Semicollared flycatcher, Ficedula semitorquata
- European pied flycatcher, Ficedula hypoleuca
- Collared flycatcher, Ficedula albicollis
- Common redstart, Phoenicurus phoenicurus
- Little rock-thrush, Monticola rufocinereus
- Rufous-tailed rock-thrush, Monticola saxatilis
- Miombo rock-thrush, Monticola angolensis
- Whinchat, Saxicola rubetra
- African stonechat, Saxicola torquatus
- Moorland chat, Pinarochroa sordida
- Mocking cliff-chat, Thamnolaea cinnamomeiventris
- Sooty chat, Myrmecocichla nigra
- Arnot's chat, Myrmecocichla arnotti
- Northern wheatear, Oenanthe oenanthe
- Capped wheatear, Oenanthe pileata (A)
- Isabelline wheatear, Oenanthe isabellina
- Heuglin's wheatear, Oenanthe heuglini
- Desert wheatear, Oenanthe deserti
- Pied wheatear, Oenanthe pleschanka
- White-fronted black-chat, Oenanthe albifrons
- Familiar chat, Oenanthe familiaris
- Brown-tailed chat, Oenanthe scotocerca (A)

== Dapple-throat and allies ==
Order: Passeriformes Family: Modulatricidae

This species and two others, all of different genera, were formerly placed in family Promeropidae, the sugarbirds, but were accorded their own family in 2017.

- Gray-chested babbler, Kakamega poliothorax

== Sunbirds and spiderhunters ==
Order: Passeriformes Family: Nectariniidae

The sunbirds and spiderhunters are very small passerine birds which feed largely on nectar, although they will also take insects, especially when feeding young. Flight is fast and direct on their short wings. Most species can take nectar by hovering like a hummingbird, but usually perch to feed.

- Fraser's sunbird, Deleornis fraseri
- Gray-headed sunbird, Deleornis axillaris
- Western violet-backed sunbird, Anthreptes longuemarei
- Eastern violet-backed sunbird, Anthreptes orientalis
- Little green sunbird, Anthreptes seimundi
- Green sunbird, Anthreptes rectirostris
- Collared sunbird, Hedydipna collaris
- Pygmy sunbird, Hedydipna platura
- Green-headed sunbird, Cyanomitra verticalis
- Blue-throated brown sunbird, Cyanomitra cyanolaema
- Blue-headed sunbird, Cyanomitra alinae
- Olive sunbird, Cyanomitra olivacea
- Green-throated sunbird, Chalcomitra rubescens
- Amethyst sunbird, Chalcomitra amethystina
- Scarlet-chested sunbird, Chalcomitra senegalensis
- Purple-breasted sunbird, Nectarinia purpureiventris
- Tacazze sunbird, Nectarinia tacazze
- Bronze sunbird, Nectarinia kilimensis
- Malachite sunbird, Nectarinia famosa
- Red-tufted sunbird, Nectarinia johnstoni
- Golden-winged sunbird, Drepanorhynchus reichenowi
- Olive-bellied sunbird, Cinnyris chloropygius
- Tiny sunbird, Cinnyris minullus
- Stuhlmann's sunbird, Cinnyris stuhlmanni
- Prigogine's sunbird, Cinnyris prigoginei
- Northern double-collared sunbird, Cinnyris reichenowi
- Greater double-collared sunbird, Cinnyris afer
- Regal sunbird, Cinnyris regius
- Beautiful sunbird, Cinnyris pulchellus
- Mariqua sunbird, Cinnyris mariquensis
- Red-chested sunbird, Cinnyris erythrocercus
- Purple-banded sunbird, Cinnyris bifasciatus
- Orange-tufted sunbird, Cinnyris bouvieri
- Palestine sunbird, Cinnyris osea
- Shining sunbird, Cinnyris habessinicus
- Superb sunbird, Cinnyris superbus
- Variable sunbird, Cinnyris venustus
- Copper sunbird, Cinnyris cupreus

== Weavers and allies ==
Order: Passeriformes Family: Ploceidae

The weavers are small passerine birds related to the finches. They are seed-eating birds with rounded conical bills. The males of many species are brightly coloured, usually in red or yellow and black. Some species show variation in colour only in the breeding season.

- White-billed buffalo-weaver, Bubalornis albirostris
- Red-billed buffalo-weaver, Bubalornis niger
- White-headed buffalo-weaver, Dinemellia dinemelli
- Speckle-fronted weaver, Sporopipes frontalis
- White-browed sparrow-weaver, Plocepasser mahali
- Chestnut-crowned sparrow-weaver, Plocepasser superciliosus
- Gray-headed social-weaver, Pseudonigrita arnaudi
- Red-bellied malimbe, Malimbus erythrogaster
- Blue-billed malimbe, Malimbus nitens
- Crested malimbe, Malimbus malimbicus
- Red-headed malimbe, Malimbus rubricollis
- Red-headed weaver, Anaplectes rubriceps
- Baglafecht weaver, Ploceus baglafecht
- Little weaver, Ploceus luteolus
- Slender-billed weaver, Ploceus pelzelni
- Black-necked weaver, Ploceus nigricollis
- Spectacled weaver, Ploceus ocularis
- Black-billed weaver, Ploceus melanogaster
- Strange weaver, Ploceus alienus
- Holub's golden-weaver, Ploceus xanthops
- Orange weaver, Ploceus aurantius
- Northern brown-throated weaver, Ploceus castanops
- Northern masked-weaver, Ploceus taeniopterus (A)
- Lesser masked-weaver, Ploceus intermedius
- Vitelline masked-weaver, Ploceus vitellinus
- Heuglin's masked-weaver, Ploceus heuglini
- Fox's weaver, Ploceus spekeoides (E)
- Vieillot's black weaver, Ploceus nigerrimus
- Village weaver, Ploceus cucullatus
- Weyns's weaver, Ploceus weynsi
- Black-headed weaver, Ploceus melanocephalus
- Golden-backed weaver, Ploceus jacksoni
- Chestnut weaver, Ploceus rubiginosus
- Cinnamon weaver, Ploceus badius
- Golden-naped weaver, Ploceus aureonucha (A)
- Yellow-mantled weaver, Ploceus tricolor
- Maxwell's black weaver, Ploceus albinucha
- Forest weaver, Ploceus bicolor
- Brown-capped weaver, Ploceus insignis
- Compact weaver, Pachyphantes superciliosus
- Cardinal quelea, Quelea cardinalis
- Red-headed quelea, Quelea erythrops
- Red-billed quelea, Quelea quelea
- Northern red bishop, Euplectes franciscanus
- Southern red bishop, Euplectes orix
- Black-winged bishop, Euplectes hordeaceus
- Black bishop, Euplectes gierowii
- Yellow-crowned bishop, Euplectes afer
- Yellow bishop, Euplectes capensis
- White-winged widowbird, Euplectes albonotatus
- Yellow-mantled widowbird, Euplectes macroura
- Red-collared widowbird, Euplectes ardens
- Red-cowled widowbird, Euplectes laticauda
- Fan-tailed widowbird, Euplectes axillaris
- Marsh widowbird, Euplectes hartlaubi
- Grosbeak weaver, Amblyospiza albifrons

== Waxbills and allies ==
Order: Passeriformes Family: Estrildidae

The estrildid finches are small passerine birds of the Old World tropics and Australasia. They are gregarious and often colonial seed eaters with short thick but pointed bills. They are all similar in structure and habits, but have wide variation in plumage colours and patterns.

- Gray-headed silverbill, Spermestes griseicapilla (A)
- Bronze mannikin, Spermestes cucullatus
- Magpie mannikin, Spermestes fringilloides
- Black-and-white mannikin, Spermestes bicolor
- African silverbill, Euodice cantans
- White-collared oliveback, Nesocharis ansorgei
- Yellow-bellied waxbill, Coccopygia quartinia
- Green-backed twinspot, Mandingoa nitidula
- Shelley's crimsonwing, Cryptospiza shelleyi
- Dusky crimsonwing, Cryptospiza jacksoni
- Abyssinian crimsonwing, Cryptospiza salvadorii
- Red-faced crimsonwing, Cryptospiza reichenovii
- Jameson's antpecker, Parmoptila jamesoni
- White-breasted nigrita, Nigrita fusconota
- Chestnut-breasted nigrita, Nigrita bicolor
- Gray-headed nigrita, Nigrita canicapilla
- Pale-fronted nigrita, Nigrita luteifrons
- Gray-headed oliveback, Delacourella capistrata
- Black-faced waxbill, Brunhilda erythronotos
- Black-cheeked waxbill, Brunhilda charmosyna
- Black-crowned waxbill, Estrilda nonnula
- Kandt's waxbill, Estrilda kandti
- Orange-cheeked waxbill, Estrilda melpoda (A)
- Fawn-breasted waxbill, Estrilda paludicola
- Common waxbill, Estrilda astrild
- Black-rumped waxbill, Estrilda troglodytes
- Crimson-rumped waxbill, Estrilda rhodopyga
- Quailfinch, Ortygospiza atricollis
- Cut-throat, Amadina fasciata
- Zebra waxbill, Amandava subflava
- Purple grenadier, Uraeginthus ianthinogaster
- Red-cheeked cordonbleu, Uraeginthus bengalus
- Grant's bluebill, Spermophaga poliogenys
- Red-headed bluebill, Spermophaga ruficapilla
- Black-bellied seedcracker, Pyrenestes ostrinus
- Green-winged pytilia, Pytilia melba
- Orange-winged pytilia, Pytilia afra
- Red-winged pytilia, Pytilia phoenicoptera
- Dybowski's twinspot, Euschistospiza dybowskii
- Dusky twinspot, Euschistospiza cinereovinacea
- Brown twinspot, Clytospiza monteiri
- Red-billed firefinch, Lagonosticta senegala
- African firefinch, Lagonosticta rubricata
- Jameson's firefinch, Lagonosticta rhodopareia
- Black-bellied firefinch, Lagonosticta rara
- Bar-breasted firefinch, Lagonosticta rufopicta
- Black-faced firefinch, Lagonosticta larvata

== Indigobirds ==
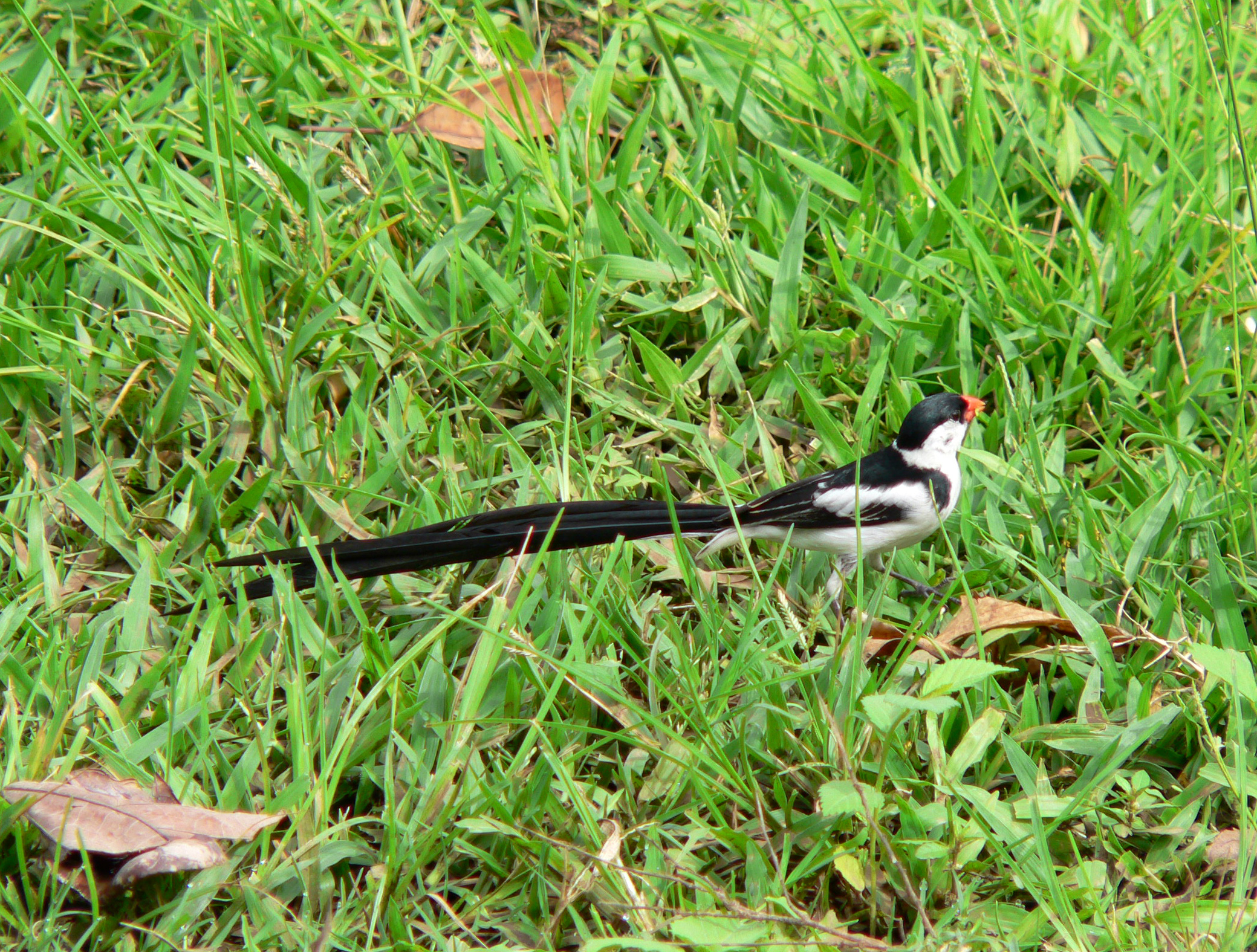
Pin-tailed whydah

Order: Passeriformes Family: Viduidae

The indigobirds are finch-like species which usually have black or indigo predominating in their plumage. All are brood parasites which lay their eggs in the nests of estrildid finches.

- Pin-tailed whydah, Vidua macroura
- Broad-tailed paradise-whydah, Vidua obtusa (A)
- Eastern paradise-whydah, Vidua paradisaea
- Steel-blue whydah, Vidua hypocherina
- Straw-tailed whydah, Vidua fischeri
- Village indigobird, Vidua chalybeata
- Wilson's indigobird, Vidua wilsoni
- Parasitic weaver, Anomalospiza imberbis

== Old World sparrows ==
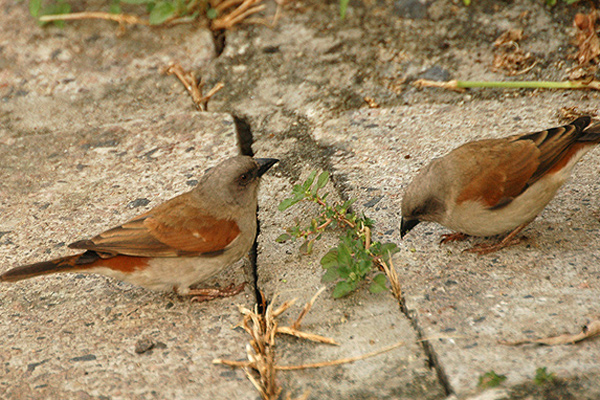
Gray-headed sparrow

Order: Passeriformes Family: Passeridae

Sparrows are small passerine birds. In general, sparrows tend to be small, plump, brown or grey birds with short tails and short powerful beaks. Sparrows are seed eaters, but they also consume small insects.

- House sparrow, Passer domesticus (I)
- Shelley's rufous sparrow, Passer shelleyi
- Northern gray-headed sparrow, Passer griseus
- Parrot-billed sparrow, Passer gongonensis
- Chestnut sparrow, Passer eminibey
- Yellow-spotted bush sparrow, Gymnoris pyrgita
- Sahel bush sparrow, Gymnoris dentata

== Wagtails and pipits ==
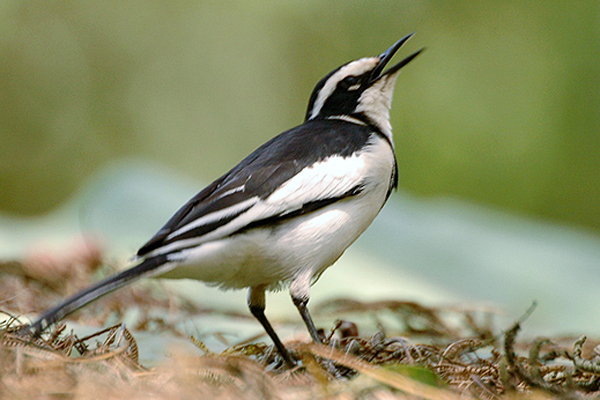
African pied wagtail

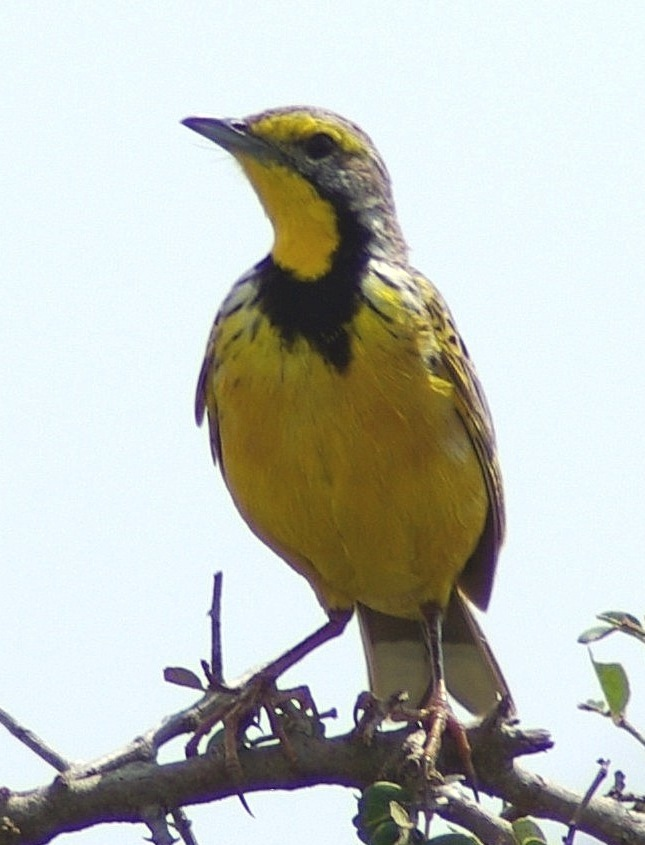
Yellow-throated longclaw

Order: Passeriformes Family: Motacillidae

Motacillidae is a family of small passerine birds with medium to long tails. They include the wagtails, longclaws, and pipits. They are slender ground-feeding insectivores of open country.

- Cape wagtail, Motacilla capensis
- Mountain wagtail, Motacilla clara
- Gray wagtail, Motacilla cinerea
- Western yellow wagtail, Motacilla flava
- African pied wagtail, Motacilla aguimp
- White wagtail, Motacilla alba
- African pipit, Anthus cinnamomeus
- Long-billed pipit, Anthus similis
- Tawny pipit, Anthus campestris (A)
- Plain-backed pipit, Anthus leucophrys
- Striped pipit, Anthus lineiventris (A)
- Tree pipit, Anthus trivialis
- Red-throated pipit, Anthus cervinus
- Short-tailed pipit, Anthus brachyurus
- Golden pipit, Tmetothylacus tenellus (A)
- Yellow-throated longclaw, Macronyx croceus

== Finches, euphonias, and allies ==
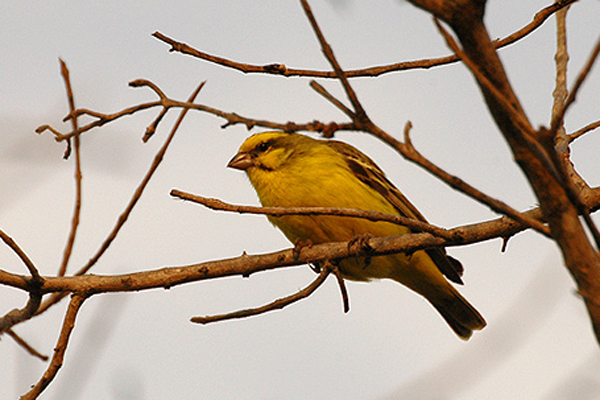
Yellow-fronted canary at Queen Elizabeth NP, Uganda

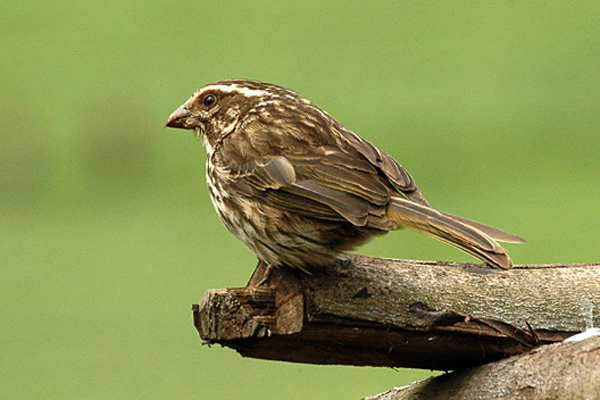
Streaky seedeater

Order: Passeriformes Family: Fringillidae

Finches are seed-eating passerine birds, that are small to moderately large and have a strong beak, usually conical and in some species very large. All have twelve tail feathers and nine primaries. These birds have a bouncing flight with alternating bouts of flapping and gliding on closed wings, and most sing well.

- Oriole finch, Linurgus olivaceus
- White-rumped seedeater, Crithagra leucopygia
- Yellow-fronted canary, Crithagra mozambicus
- African citril, Crithagra citrinelloides (A)
- Western citril, Crithagra frontalis
- Southern citril, Crithagra hyposticta (A)
- Papyrus canary, Crithagra koliensis
- Black-throated canary, Crithagra atrogularis
- Reichenow's seedeater, Crithagra reichenowi
- White-bellied canary, Crithagra dorsostriata
- Brimstone canary, Crithagra sulphuratus
- Streaky seedeater, Crithagra striolatus
- Thick-billed seedeater, Crithagra burtoni
- West African seedeater, Crithagra canicapilla
- Reichard's seedeater, Crithagra reichardi
- Yellow-crowned canary, Serinus flavivertes

== Old World buntings ==
Order: Passeriformes Family: Emberizidae

The emberizids are a large family of passerine birds. They are seed-eating birds with distinctively shaped bills. Many emberizid species have distinctive head patterns.

- Brown-rumped bunting, Emberiza affinis
- Ortolan bunting, Emberiza hortulana (A)
- Cabanis's bunting, Emberiza cabanisi
- Golden-breasted bunting, Emberiza flaviventris
- Somali bunting, Emberiza poliopleura (A)
- Cinnamon-breasted bunting, Emberiza tahapisi

== See also ==
- List of birds
- Lists of birds by region
- List of birds of Jinja
