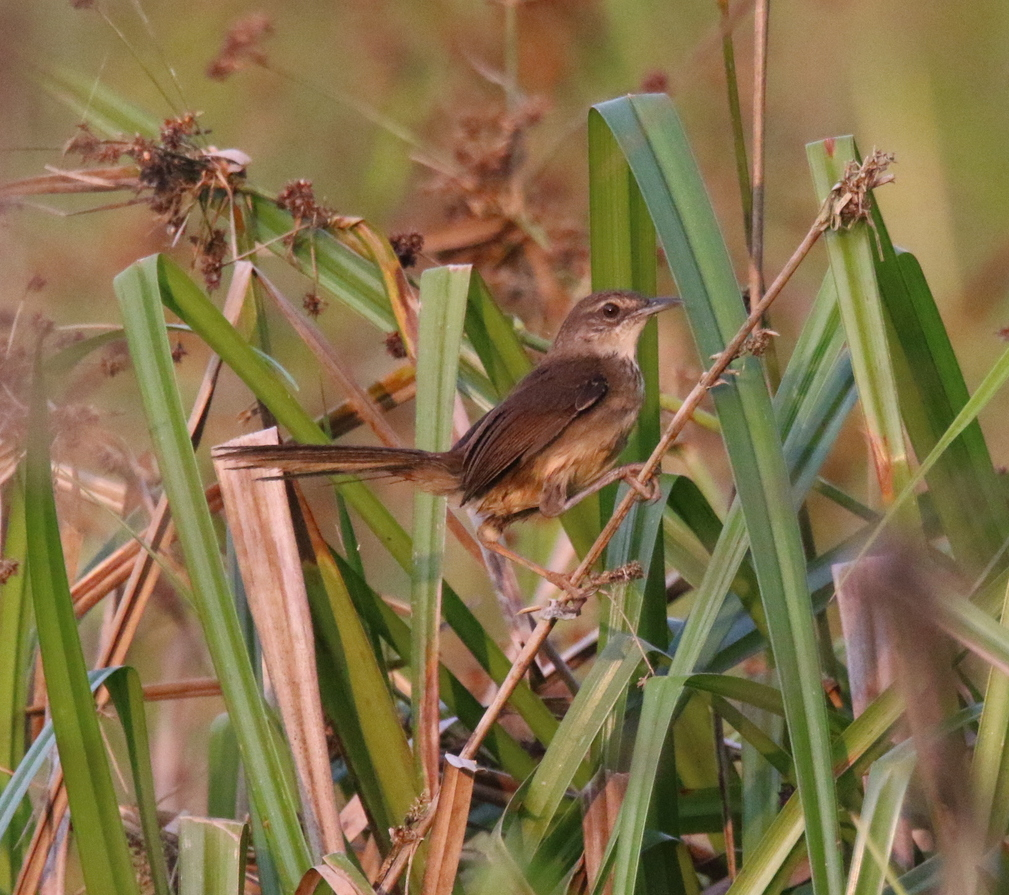

Conservation status
- Near Threatened (IUCN 3.1)

Scientific classification
- Kingdom: Animalia
- Phylum: Chordata
- Class: Aves
- Order: Passeriformes
- Family: Locustellidae
- Genus: Bradypterus
- Species: B. grandis

Binomial name
- Bradypterus grandis Ogilvie-Grant, 1917
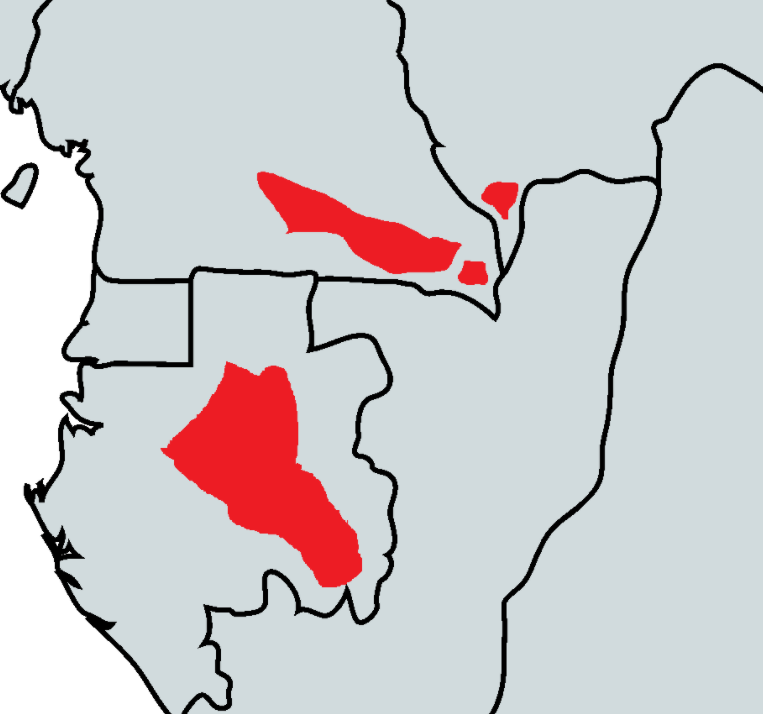

= Dja River scrub warbler =

Species of bird

The Dja River scrub warbler (Bradypterus grandis) is a species of Old World warbler in the family Locustellidae. It is found in Cameroon, Central African Republic, and Gabon. Its natural habitat is swamps. It is threatened by habitat loss.

== Description ==
The bird is mainly olive-brown and has a greyish and narrow supercilium. The chin and throat are white, and the tail is tawny brown. The breast has broad, black streaks. The upper manidble is black while the lower mandible is grey, and both the iris and the toes are brown in color.

The juvenile is white below with no breast band and the upper breast is spotted.

This species is similar to the little rush warbler, but the little rush warbler is smaller, has a finer bill, a more rounded tail and less prominent throat streaking.

== Voice ==
The song is similar to the Grauer's swamp warbler. It is a loud, descending trill psuit-psuit-psuit-its-struuuuuu or a higher pitched tsweet-tsweet-tsweet-its-struuuuuu.
