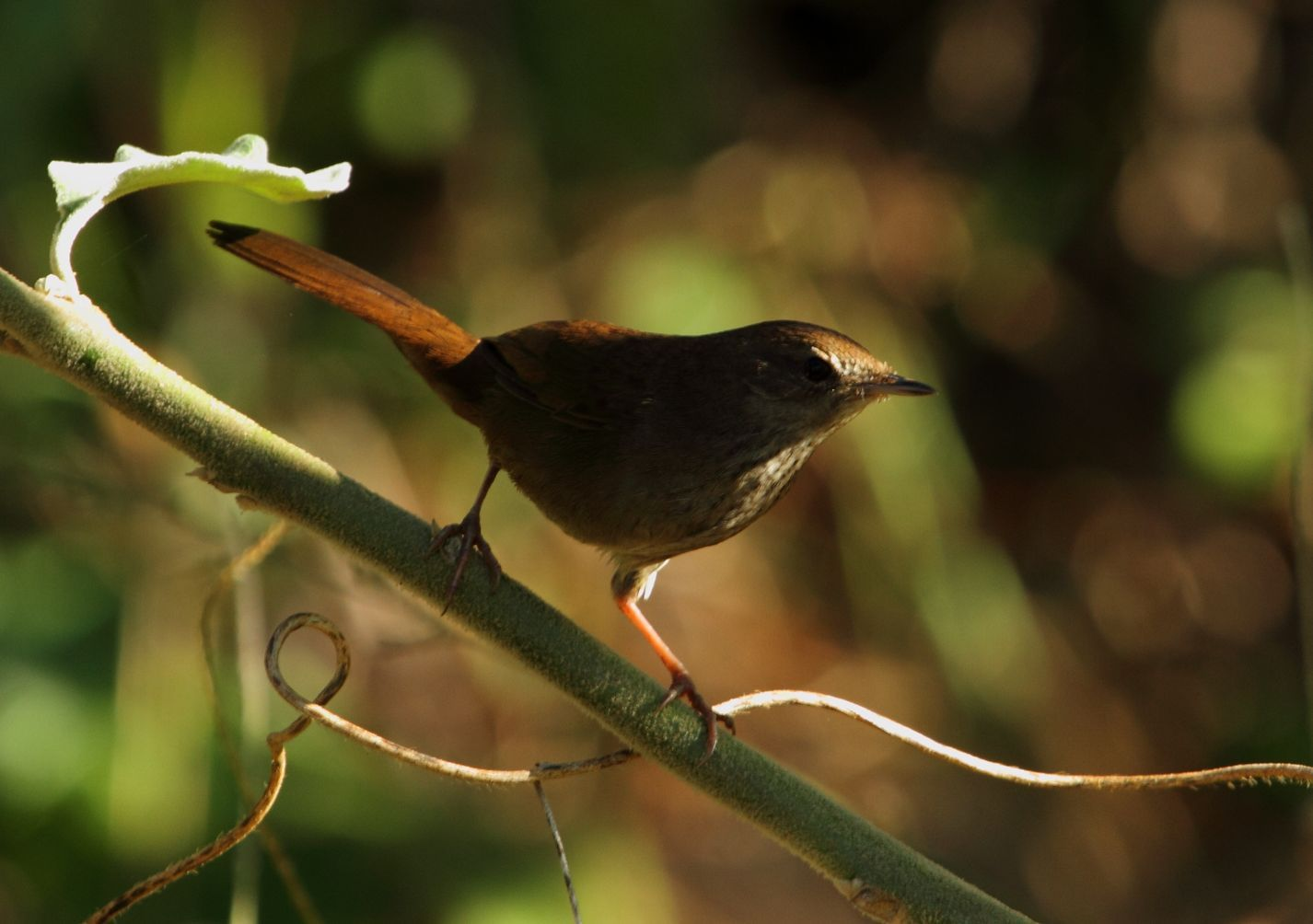
- B. b. godfreyi in Pietermaritzburg

Conservation status
- Least Concern (IUCN 3.1)

Scientific classification
- Kingdom: Animalia
- Phylum: Chordata
- Class: Aves
- Order: Passeriformes
- Family: Locustellidae
- Genus: Bradypterus
- Species: B. barratti

Binomial name
- Bradypterus barratti Sharpe, 1876

= Barratt's warbler =

Species of bird

Barratt's warbler (Bradypterus barratti), or the African scrub warbler, is a species of Old World warbler in the family Locustellidae. It is found in eastern South Africa, Lesotho, eastern Zimbabwe, and adjacent western Mozambique. Its natural habitat is subtropical or tropical moist montane forests.

== Taxonomy and systematics ==
Bradypterus barratti was described by Sharpe in 1876 from the Mac Mac goldfields, Mashishing, Mpumalanga. Barratt's Warbler has been regarded as conspecific with the Evergreen Forest Warbler (Bradypterus lopezi); however, they differ in voice and morphology. Currently, the Barratt's Warbler is considered polytypic, with four races being recognized: B. b. barratti, B. b. godfreyi, B. b. priesti and B. b. cathkinensis.

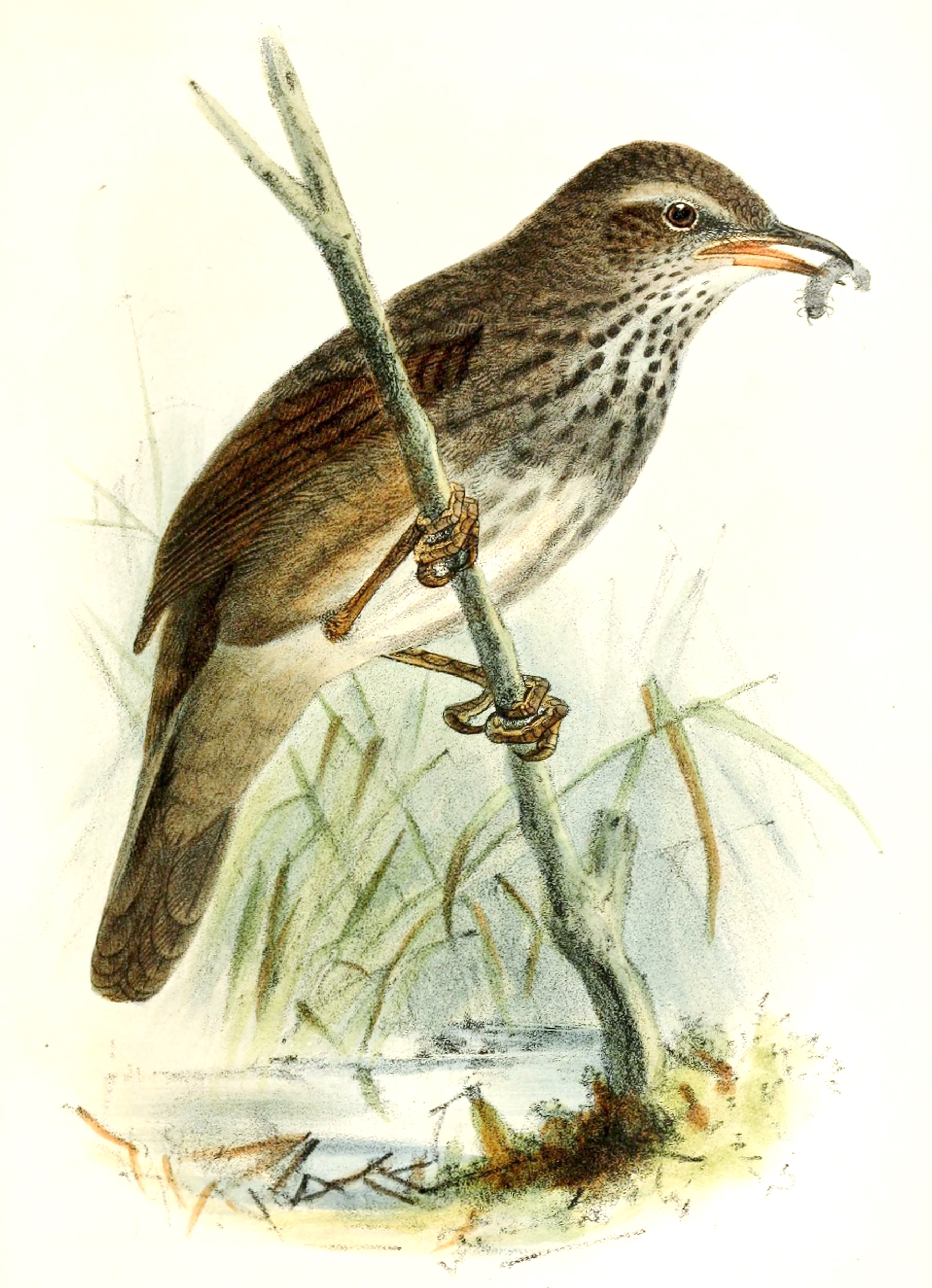
Barratt's warbler

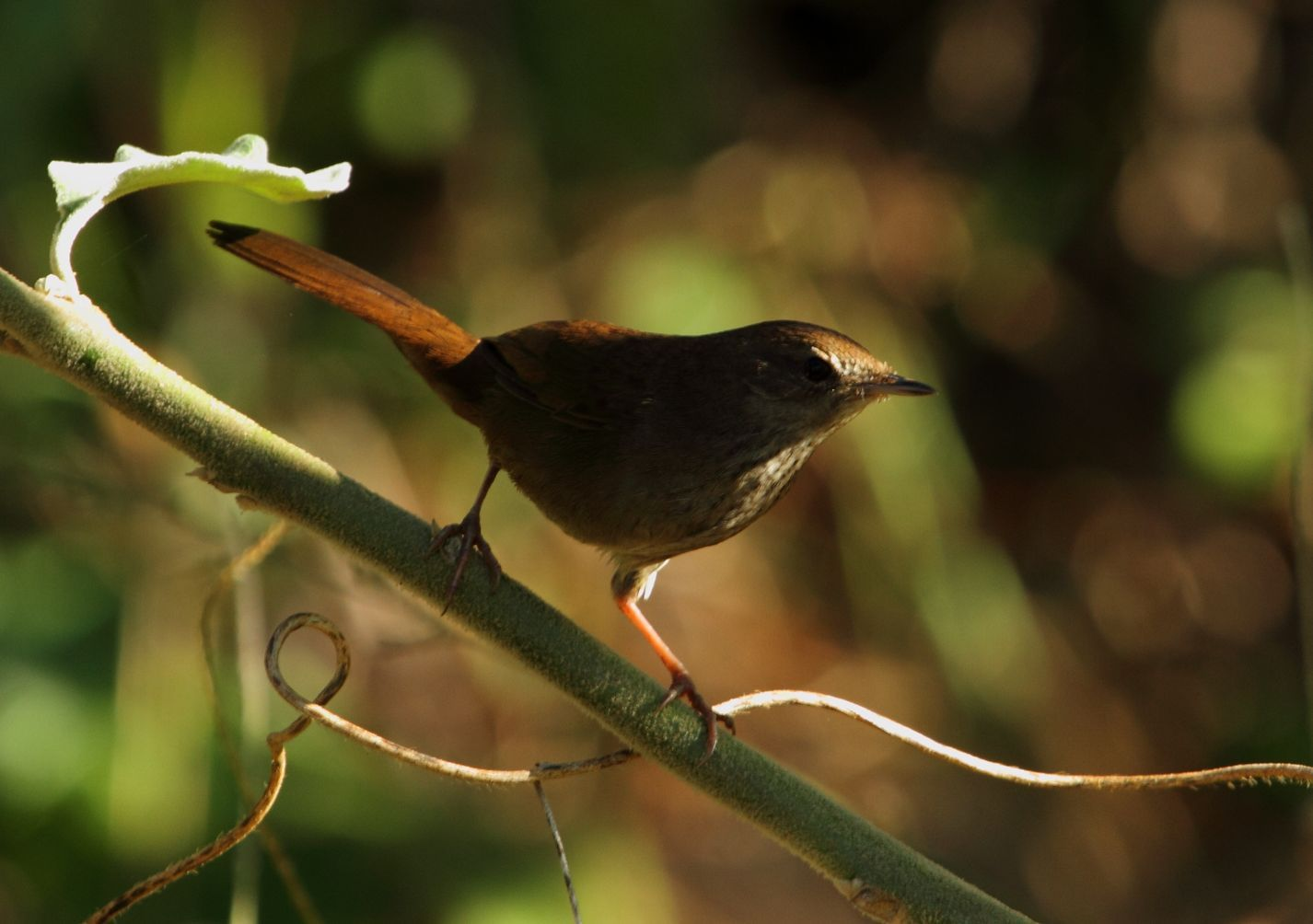
Barratt's warbler

== Identification ==
The bird is 15 cm in size, and its average weight is 15 g. Males and females are alike.

In adults, the underparts of these birds are chocolate-brown; their crown-to-tail, rump, and tail are washed rufous. They have dark brown lores, cheeks, and ears coverts, and their supercilium is greyish buff. Their upper wings coverts are rufous-brown and, and the marginal part of the upper wing is buffy. Their primaries are rufous-brown with cinnamon-brown outer webs. Secondaries are rufous-brown with cinnamon brown. Their axillaries and underwings are ashy brown. Their throats and chins are buffy white, with their throats streaked dark brown. At the center of their breast and belly is white, streaked with grey. They have brownish olive undertail, thighs, and flanks. Their eyes are hazel-brown or pale to dark brown. They have black bills, and their legs and feet are dark brown.

B. b. barratti wings measure 60–68 cm; tails are 60–69 cm; tarsus 18–21 cm; culmen 11–13 cm.

There is a lack of knowledge about juvenile characteristics. Juveniles have shorter tails; upper parts are more olive than adults and their supercilium and underparts are yellow.

Barratt's warbler is very similar to and confused with the Knysna warbler since their distributions overlap, but they have shorter tails and are less streaked below. Their songs are also similar, but the opening of the Knysna Warbler is longer, louder, and discrete.

== Geographic variation and distribution ==
Barratt's Warbler is endemic to southern Africa. Its distribution is patchy in eastern highlands of Zimbabwe. It is historically reported from adjacent Mozambique and also from Zoutpansberg, Limpopo Province, KwaZulu-Natal, and Lesotho and to about Grahamstown in the Eastern Cape. The variation involves differences in plumage and the extent of throat streaking and size:

- B. b. priesti (E Zimbabwe) Much paler than other races. The throat and upper breast has short grey-brown streaks.
- B. b. barratti (NE South Africa) Throat and belly are greyer (less white). There, streaking extends from throat to chin into the breast.
- B. b. godfreyi (Lowland SE South Africa) Looks similar to barratti, but it is slightly darker. Their underparts are grey-buff, and their streaking is less distinct and prominent on the throat. The subspecies was named after Robert Godfrey (1872–1948).
- B. b. cathkinensis (Highlands of Drakensberg and Lesotho) More olive-brown than the nominate. It has streaking on the throat and upper breast, larger than other races.

== Habitat ==
Barratt's Warbler inhabits dense tangled scrub, bracken (Pteridium sp), brambles (Smilax spp and alien Rubus spp), and heath (Erica spp) along streams, in clearings, and in edges of forest and plantations.

== Movement and migrations ==
Birds may leave their breeding sites during the colder winter months. The birds from Zimbabwe move east to Mozambique lowlands. Birds from Drakensberg and the KwaZulu-Natal interior may move to the coast. It migrates in winter to lower altitudes, as far as the coast in the Eastern Cape.

== Voice ==
The song starts with high pitched notes tik, tik, tik..., followed by lower notes speeding up to a trill. The alarm call is a quiet chrr-chrr.

== Foraging and food ==
Little is known. It forages in or close to the ground, running mouse-like. It eats insects, including crickets.

== Behavior ==
The males sing near the nest during the breeding period. It is usually solitary or in pairs. It remains on or near the ground, climbing agilely among vegetation.

== Breeding habits ==
They are monogamous, solitary nesting and territorial animals. Nests are made up of plant debris, twigs, grass, and leaves placed on the ground or low down, between branches. Nest diameter is 129 mm; cup diameter is 52 mm, and depth is 55 mm. In Zimbabwe, eggs are laid in October (2), November (3), and December (2); in KwaZulu-Natal, September and November; in Eastern Cape, November (1). The clutch is two eggs. They are oval and pinkish-white, with dashes of brown and greys. The incubation period is unknown. Nestlings fed by both adults.
