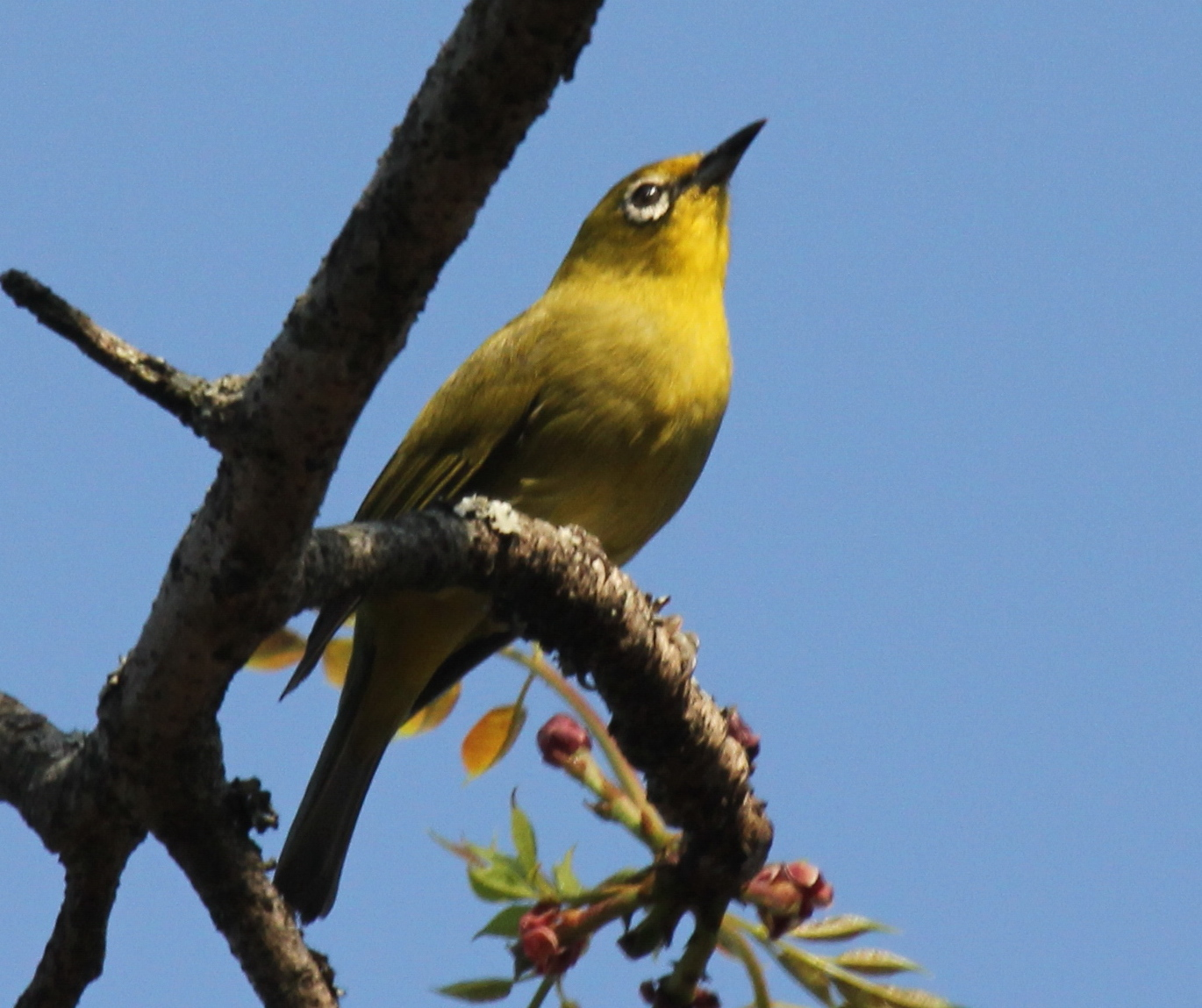
- In Kruger National Park, South Africa

Scientific classification
- Kingdom: Animalia
- Phylum: Chordata
- Class: Aves
- Order: Passeriformes
- Family: Zosteropidae
- Genus: Zosterops
- Species: Z. anderssoni

Binomial name
- Zosterops anderssoni Shelley, 1892

= Southern yellow white-eye =

Species of bird

The southern yellow white-eye (Zosterops anderssoni) is a bird species in the family Zosteropidae. It is found in parts of southern Africa. It was formerly considered conspecific with the African yellow white-eye.

The southern yellow white-eye was formerly treated as a subspecies of the African yellow white-eye (Zosterops senegalensis; renamed the northern yellow white-eye), but it is now considered as a separate species based on the phylogenetic relationships determined in a molecular study in 2013.

Three subspecies are recognised:

- Z. a. anderssoni Shelley, 1892 – east and south Angola and north Namibia to southwest Tanzania, west Mozambique and north South Africa
- Z. a. tongensis Roberts, 1931 – southeast Zimbabwe, south Mozambique and northeast South Africa
- Z. a. stierlingi Reichenow, 1899 – east and south Tanzania, east Zambia, Malawi and north Mozambique

Its diet consists of insects, fruits, seeds, and grains.
