= Emutail =

Genus of birds

The emutails are a pair of birds formerly assigned to the genus Dromaeocercus. They are both placed in the family Locustellidae.

- Brown emutail, Bradypterus brunneus
- Grey emutail, Bradypterus seebohmi
