= Brown emutail =

Conservation status
- Least Concern (IUCN 3.1)

Scientific classification
- Kingdom: Animalia
- Phylum: Chordata
- Class: Aves
- Order: Passeriformes
- Family: Locustellidae
- Genus: Bradypterus
- Species: B. brunneus

Binomial name
- Bradypterus brunneus (Sharpe, 1877)

Synonyms
- Dromaeocercus brunneus

Species of bird

The brown emutail (Bradypterus brunneus) is an emutail in the family Locustellidae. It is found only in Madagascar. Its natural habitat is subtropical or tropical moist montane forests. It is threatened by habitat loss.
