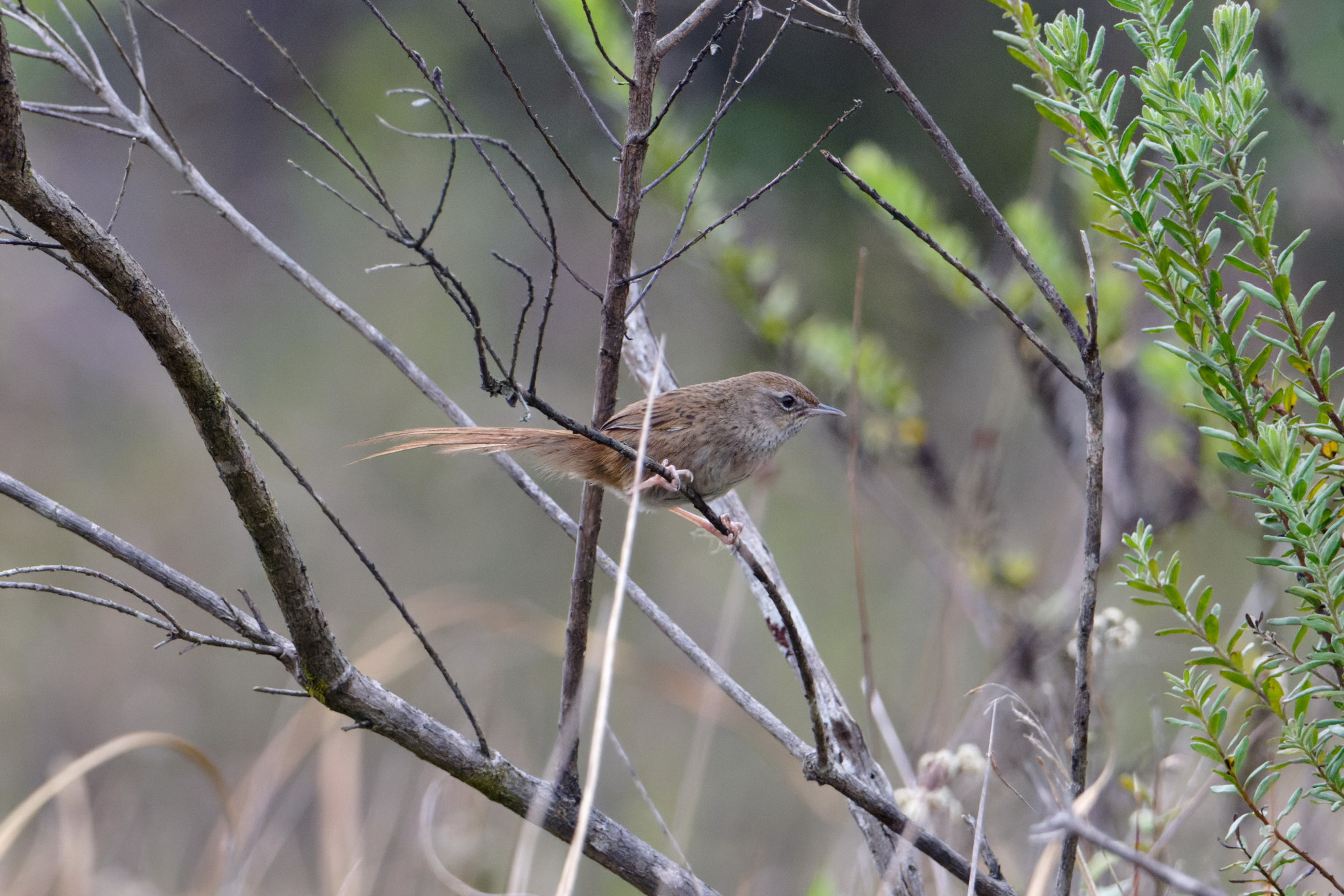

Conservation status
- Least Concern (IUCN 3.1)

Scientific classification
- Kingdom: Animalia
- Phylum: Chordata
- Class: Aves
- Order: Passeriformes
- Family: Locustellidae
- Genus: Bradypterus
- Species: B. seebohmi

Binomial name
- Bradypterus seebohmi (Sharpe, 1879)

Synonyms
- Dromaeocercus seebohmi Amphilais seebohmi

= Grey emutail =

Species of bird

The grey emutail (Bradypterus seebohmi), also known as the Madagascan grassbird or feather-tailed warbler, is an emutail in the family Locustellidae. It is found only in Madagascar. Its natural habitats are subtropical or tropical moist shrubland and shrub-dominated wetland.

The specific name seebohmi refers to Henry Seebohm.
