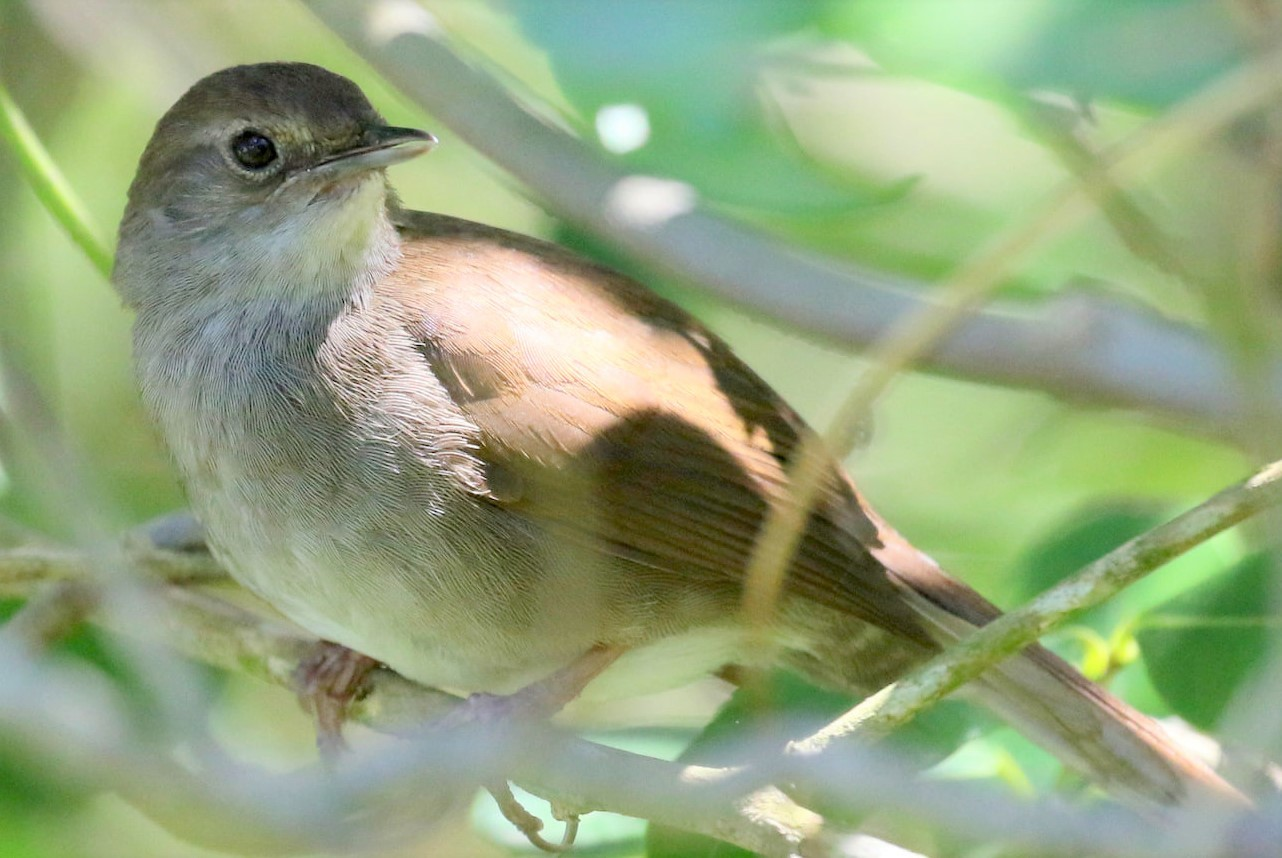

Conservation status
- Near Threatened (IUCN 3.1)

Scientific classification
- Kingdom: Animalia
- Phylum: Chordata
- Class: Aves
- Order: Passeriformes
- Family: Locustellidae
- Genus: Bradypterus
- Species: B. sylvaticus

Binomial name
- Bradypterus sylvaticus Sundevall, 1860

= Knysna warbler =

Species of bird

The Knysna warbler or Knysna scrub warbler (Bradypterus sylvaticus) is a very shy and cryptic warbler, endemic to the coastal regions of South Africa. Its population is small and probably declining, due to natural and artificial fragmentation of its habitat, and limited dispersal and reproductive ability.

== Description ==
Brown with an olivaceous tinge on the upperpart plumage, including the wings and tail. Below it is paler olivaceous brown, and whitish on the centre of the belly. The chin and throat are olivaceous brown, but mottled whitish and finely streaked. The tail is relatively short and square. The eye, bill, legs and feet are brown, though the lower mandible is paler and horn-coloured.

== Habitat and range ==
The habitat of the Knysna warbler is dense tangled scrub of forest edges, on or relatively near the coast. It has adapted to non-native bramble thickets and colonised suburban riparian woodland, though without any marked range expansion.

It occurs along the coastlines of the southern Western Cape and Eastern Cape, and marginally in KwaZulu-Natal, but is extinct from the vicinity of Durban, due to habitat loss. A small population of less than 40 pairs exists on the eastern slopes of Table Mountain, Cape Town, and it is present in forested valleys of the Langeberg. It has been recorded from some 24 nature reserves, including the Addo Elephant National Park.

== Behaviour ==
It stays near the ground at the base of vegetation, and is hard to observe. It may frequently forage on the ground. It has a distinctive tabirr call and a fine, accelerating trilled song, which can be used sparingly to call it into sight.

Most breeding territories are established in dense vegetation along streams, and nests are placed very close to the ground. They may be highly philopatric - one of three colour-ringed nestlings was seen a year later occupying its parent territory. It may undertake local migration.

== Similar species ==
It is replaced northwards by the similar Barratt's warbler, which has a somewhat longer tail, mottled throat, and distinguishable call and song.
