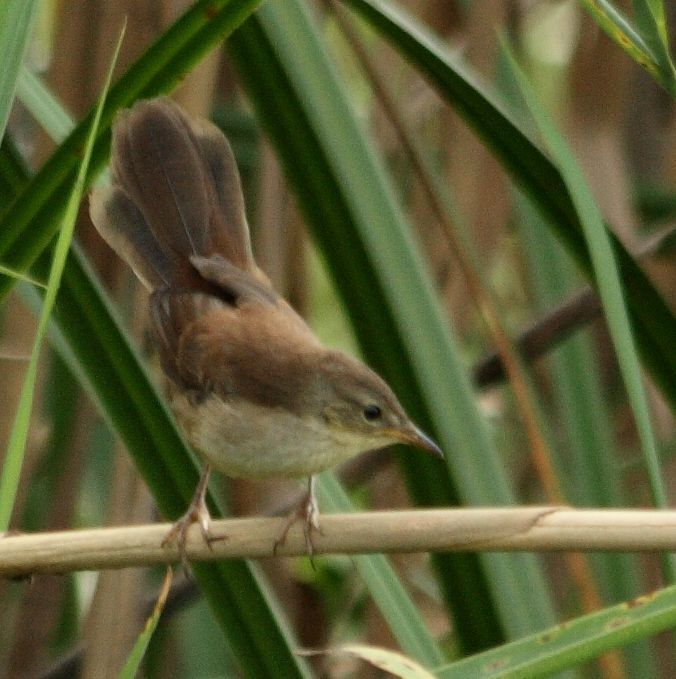
- Little rush warbler (Bradypterus baboecala)

Scientific classification
- Kingdom: Animalia
- Phylum: Chordata
- Class: Aves
- Order: Passeriformes
- Family: Locustellidae
- Genus: Bradypterus; Swainson, 1837

Type species
- Bradypterus platyurus Swainson, 1837

Species
- 12, but see text

= Bradypterus =

Genus of birds

Bradypterus is a genus of small insectivorous songbirds ("warblers") in the newly recognized grass warbler family (Locustellidae). They were formerly placed in the Sylviidae, which at that time was a wastebin taxon for the warbler-like Sylvioidea. The range of this genus extends through the warm regions from Africa around the Indian Ocean and far into Asia.

== Taxonomy ==
The genus Bradypterus (misspelled as Bradyptetus) introduced in 1837 by the English zoologist William Swainson to accommodate a single species, Bradypterus platyurus Swainson. This, the type species, is a junior synonym of Sylvia baboecala Vieillot, the little rush warbler. The genus name combines the Ancient Greek βραδυς/bradus meaning "slow" or "sluggish" with -πτερος/-pteros meaning "-winged".

The locustellid bush warblers are related to the grass warblers of Locustella and Megalurus, but share lifestyle and related adaptations and apomorphies with bush warblers in the family Cettiidae. These belong to an older lineage of Sylvioidea. Both "bush warbler" genera are smallish birds well adapted to climbing among shrubbery. They are markedly long-tailed birds, at first glance somewhat reminiscent of wrens.

These are quite terrestrial birds, which live in densely vegetated habitats like thick forest and reedbeds. They will walk away from disturbance rather than flush. The plumage similarities and skulking lifestyle make these birds hard to see and identify.

Locustellid bush warblers tend towards greyish browns above and buffish or light grey tones below. They have little patterning apart from the ubiquitous supercilium. Altogether, they appear much like the plainer species among Acrocephalus marsh-warblers in coloration. Cettiid bush warblers tend to be somewhat more compact, with less pointed tails, but are otherwise very similar.

== Species ==
This genus has been recently revised. The Sri Lanka bush warbler is sometimes placed in this genus but is now placed in its own monotypic genus (Elaphrornis). Several other former members of this genus (e.g. the Chinese bush warbler) are now placed in Locustella. Victorin's warbler is no longer a member of this genus or even the family Locustellidae, but is now placed in its own monotypic genus Cryptillas in the African warbler family Macrosphenidae.

The genus contains the following twelve species:

Image	Common name	Scientific name	Distribution
	Knysna warbler	Bradypterus sylvaticus	South, east South Africa.
	Bangwa forest warbler	Bradypterus bangwaensis	Southeast Nigeria, west Cameroon.
	Barratt's warbler	Bradypterus barratti	Southeast Africa.
	Evergreen forest warbler	Bradypterus lopezi	Central, east Africa.
	Cinnamon bracken warbler	Bradypterus cinnamomeus	Central, east, southeast Africa.
	Grey emutail	Bradypterus seebohmi	Montane northwest, northeast to central east Madagascar.
	Brown emutail	Bradypterus brunneus	Montane northwest, east Madagascar.
	Dja River scrub warbler	Bradypterus grandis	Southeast Cameroon, southwest Central African Republic and south Gabon.
	Little rush warbler	Bradypterus baboecala	Widespread in Africa.
	White-winged swamp warbler	Bradypterus carpalis	East DR Congo, Uganda, west Kenya, Rwanda and Burundi.
	Grauer's swamp warbler	Bradypterus graueri	East DR Congo, south Uganda, Rwanda and Burundi.
	Highland rush warbler	Bradypterus centralis	Central African highlands.
