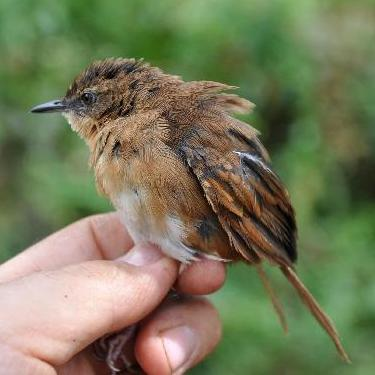

Conservation status
- Least Concern (IUCN 3.1)

Scientific classification
- Kingdom: Animalia
- Phylum: Chordata
- Class: Aves
- Order: Passeriformes
- Family: Locustellidae
- Genus: Bradypterus
- Species: B. bangwaensis

Binomial name
- Bradypterus bangwaensis Delacour, 1943

= Bangwa forest warbler =

Species of bird

The Bangwa forest warbler or Bangwa scrub warbler (Bradypterus bangwaensis) is a species of Old World warbler in the family Locustellidae. It is native to the Cameroonian Highlands forests.

It is threatened by habitat loss.

It does not migrate. It is territorial.

== Description ==
It does not exhibit physical sexual dimorphism.

== Breeding ==
It breeds in October and November.

== Vocalization ==
The males' characteristic song consists of repeating the same pitch at increasing volume. Females sometimes duet with them by singing at decreasing pitches. Females are not known to sing solo.

Bangwa forest warblers sing more frequently in wet than dry season; this difference is especially pronounced in males. The actual amount of precipitation has no effect on amount of singing.

Their peak of vocal activity is during the first hour after sunrise. Males have a second peak of vocal activity 11 hours after sunrise, but females do not.

The function of their vocalizations is unknown.
