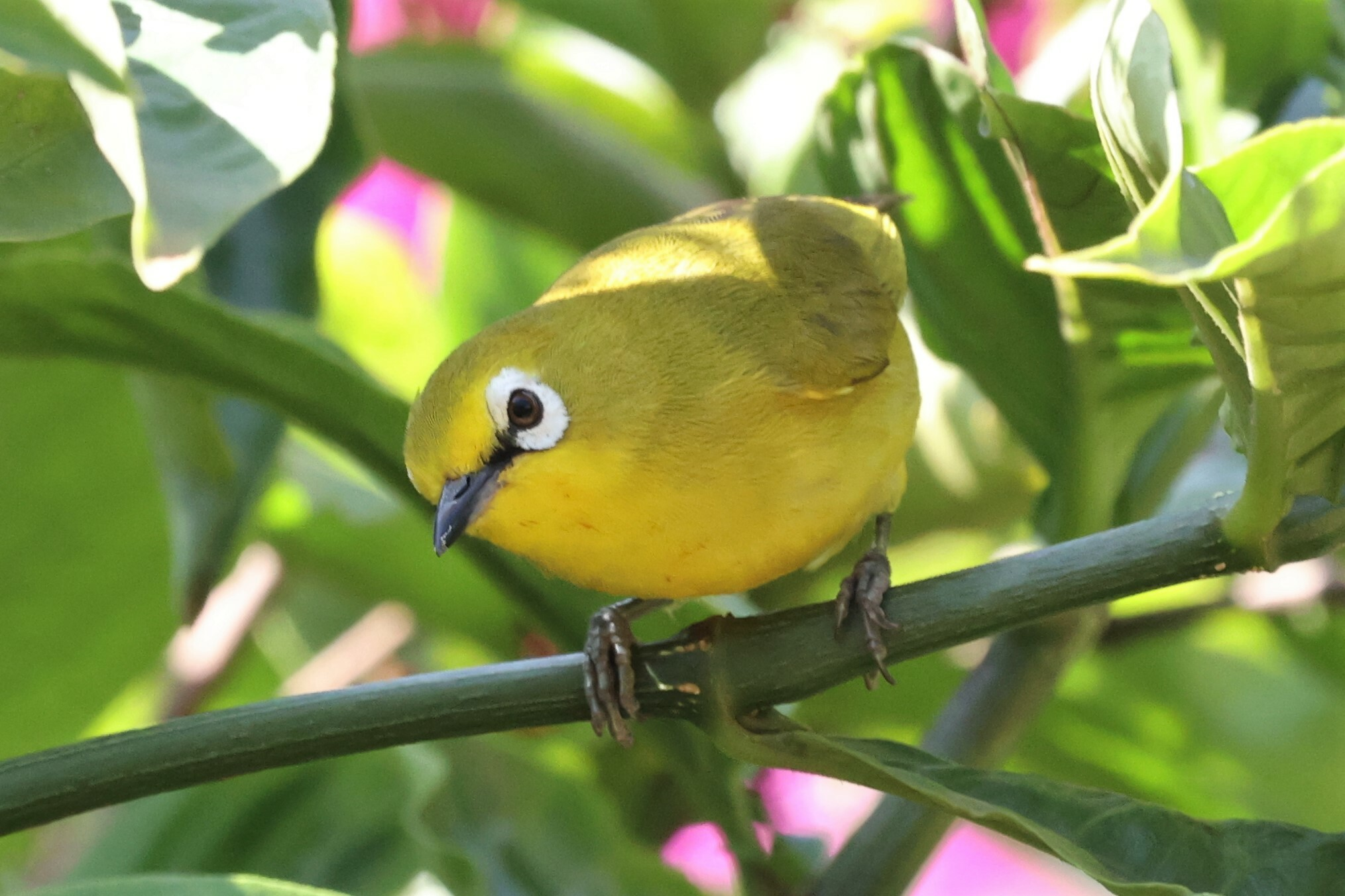

Scientific classification
- Kingdom: Animalia
- Phylum: Chordata
- Class: Aves
- Order: Passeriformes
- Family: Zosteropidae
- Genus: Zosterops
- Species: Z. stuhlmanni

Binomial name
- Zosterops stuhlmanni Reichenow, 1892

= Green white-eye =

Species of bird

The green white-eye (Zosterops stuhlmanni) is a bird species in the family Zosteropidae. It is found in Tanzania, Uganda and the Democratic Republic of the Congo.

The green white-eye was formerly treated as a subspecies of the African yellow white-eye (since renamed the northern yellow white-eye) (Zosterops senegalensis). It is now considered as a separate species based in part on the phylogenetic relationships determined in a 2013 molecular study.

Four subspecies are recognised:

- Z. s. stuhlmanni Reichenow, 1892 – northwest Tanzania, south and central Uganda
- Z. s. reichenowi Dubois, AJC, 1911 – east D.R. Congo
- Z. s. toroensis Reichenow, 1904 – northeast D.R. Congo and west Uganda
- Z. s. scotti Neumann, 1899 – southwest Uganda: Bwindi Impenetrable National Park and above 3,000 m (9,800 ft) in the Virunga Mountains
