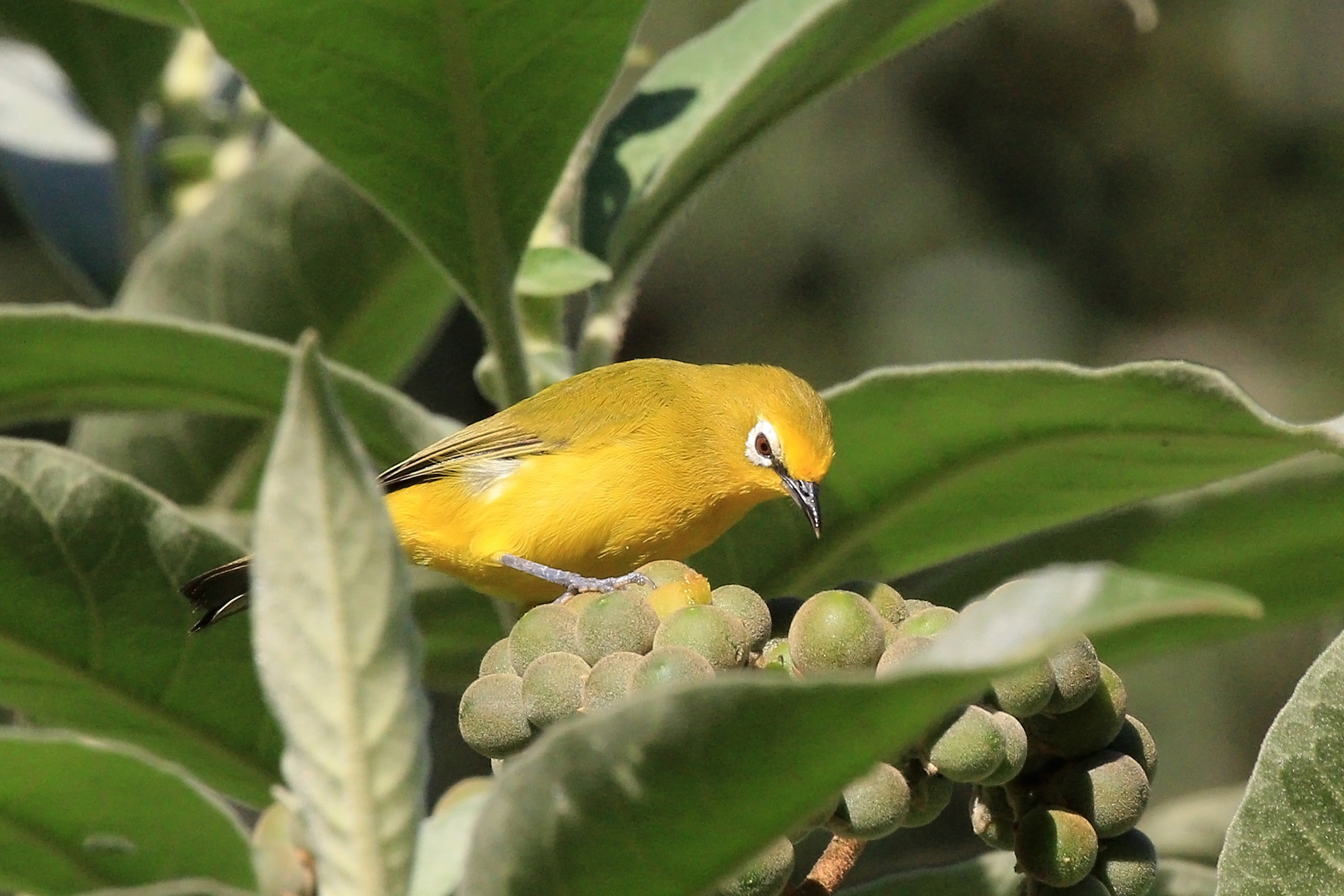
- Kakamega Forest, Kenya

Conservation status
- Least Concern (IUCN 3.1)

Scientific classification
- Kingdom: Animalia
- Phylum: Chordata
- Class: Aves
- Order: Passeriformes
- Family: Zosteropidae
- Genus: Zosterops
- Species: Z. senegalensis

Binomial name
- Zosterops senegalensis Bonaparte, 1850

= Northern yellow white-eye =

Species of bird

The northern yellow white-eye (Zosterops senegalensis), formerly the African yellow white-eye, is a species of bird in the family Zosteropidae. It is found across sub-Saharan Africa, from Senegal in the west across to southern Sudan in the east and south to northern Angola. It was formerly considered to be conspecific with the Angola white-eye.

== Taxonomy ==
The northern yellow white-eye formerly included additional subspecies. These were split to create the southern yellow white-eye and the green white-eye based partly on the results of a molecular phylogenic study in 2013.

Four subspecies are recognised:

- Z. s. senegalensis Bonaparte, 1850 – Mauritania and Senegal to northwest Ethiopia
- Z. s. jacksoni Neumann, 1899 – west Kenya and north Tanzania
- Z. s. demeryi Büttikofer, 1890 – Sierra Leone, Liberia and Ivory Coast
- Z. s. gerhardi Elzen & König, C, 1983 – south Sudan and northeast Uganda

== Description ==
A small yellow bird with a prominent white eye ring surrounding a dark eye. The underparts and head are yellow, with a black loral stripe, black bill, the flight and tail feathers are brown edged with yellowish olive. Some subspecies are greener, especially those occurring in forest. Juveniles are darker. This bird measures 11·5 cm in length and the weight varies from 6.8 to 14.1g.

== Distribution ==
The northern yellow white-eye is widely distributed in sub-Saharan Africa from Senegal, Gambia and Mauritania in the west east to Ethiopia and Eritrea then south to northern Angola.

== Behavior ==
The northern yellow white-eye has been recorded as a host of the brood parasite green-backed honeybird.

The northern yellow white-eye has a diet that mainly consists of insects; caterpillars, aphids and termite alates have all been recorded, supplemented with some fruit including those of figs and the cabbage tree Cussonia spp. It forages among the canopy of trees, gleaning prey from foliage and bark. It is frequently recorded as a member of mixed-species foraging flocks. Also takes nectar from flowers.

The nest is a small cup made out of dried grass and small twigs, placed among the foliage in a small tree about 3.5m above the ground and secured with spider web. The clutch of 2-4 eggs is laid from August–January, with most being laid in September–October. Incubation takes about 11–12 days and both sexes share this duty as well as the feeding of the nestling young which fledge after around two weeks. If disturbed in the nest the young will often panic and jump out of the nest.
