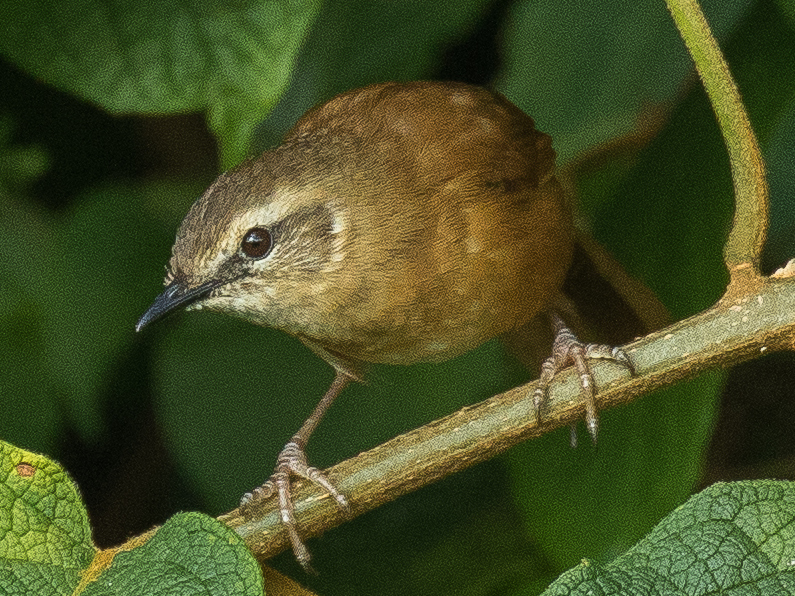
- On Mt Kenya

Conservation status
- Least Concern (IUCN 3.1)

Scientific classification
- Kingdom: Animalia
- Phylum: Chordata
- Class: Aves
- Order: Passeriformes
- Family: Locustellidae
- Genus: Bradypterus
- Species: B. cinnamomeus

Binomial name
- Bradypterus cinnamomeus (Rüppell, 1840)

= Cinnamon bracken warbler =

Species of bird

The cinnamon bracken warbler (Bradypterus cinnamomeus) is a species of Old World warbler in the family Locustellidae. It is native to mountainous regions of East Africa. Its natural habitats are subtropical or tropical moist montane forests and subtropical or tropical moist shrubland.
