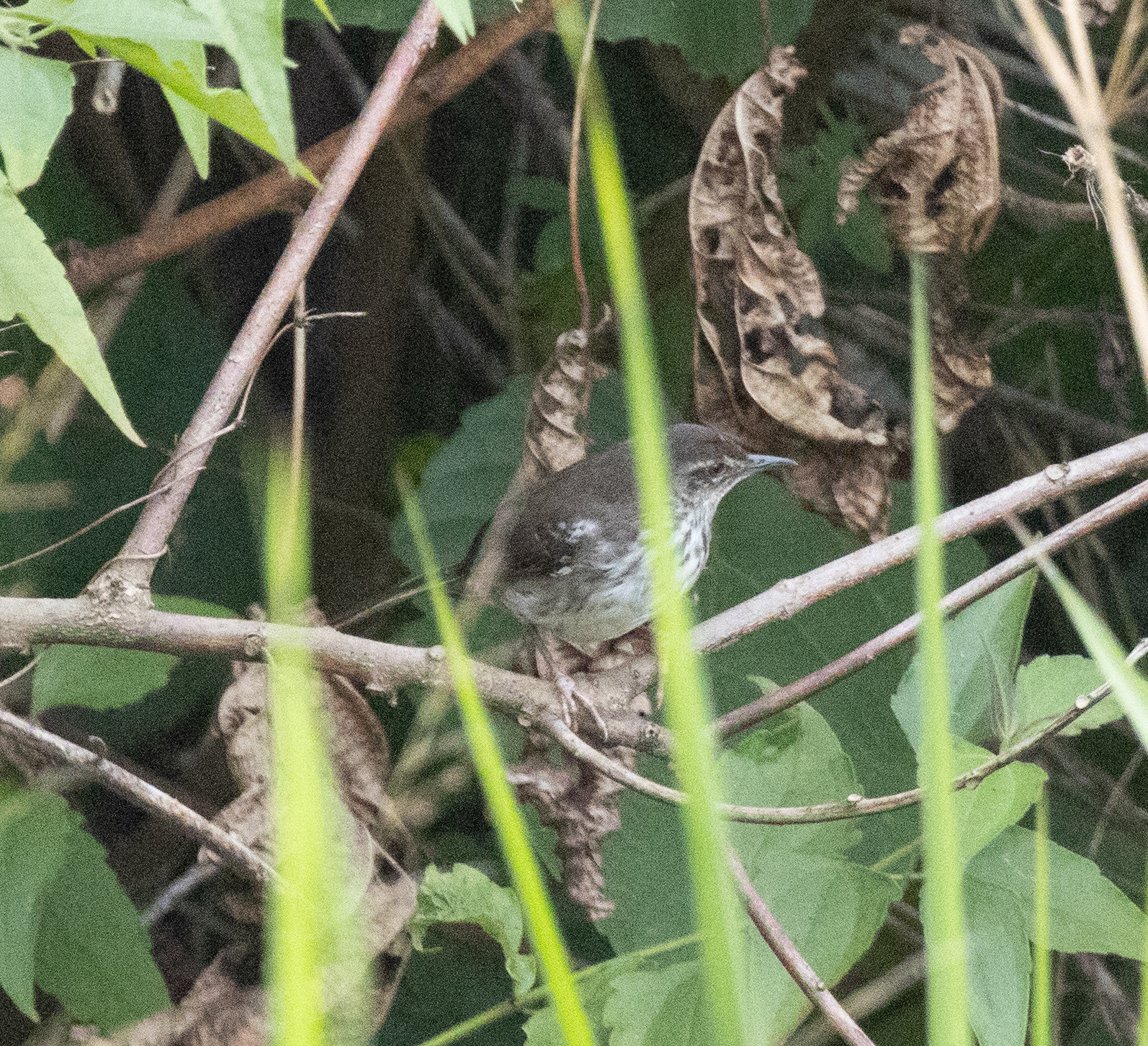

Conservation status
- Least Concern (IUCN 3.1)

Scientific classification
- Kingdom: Animalia
- Phylum: Chordata
- Class: Aves
- Order: Passeriformes
- Family: Locustellidae
- Genus: Bradypterus
- Species: B. carpalis

Binomial name
- Bradypterus carpalis Chapin, 1916
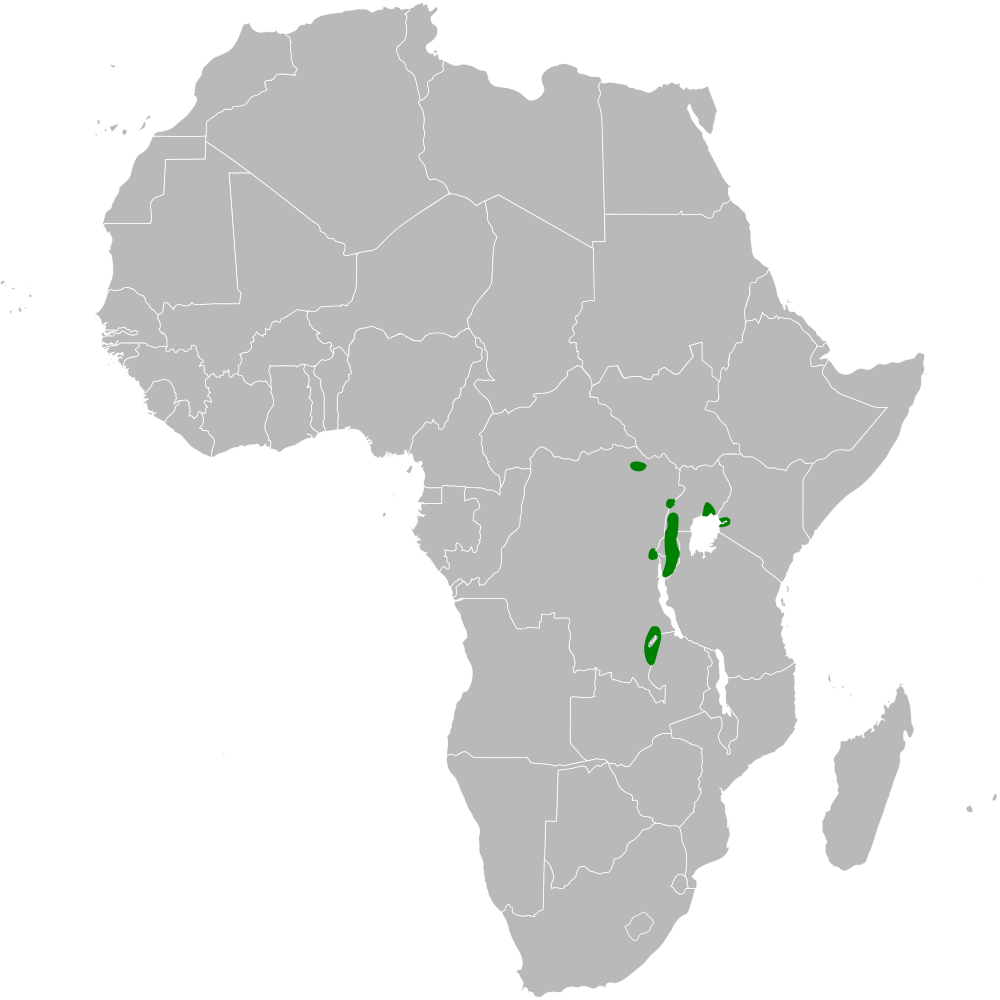

= White-winged swamp warbler =

Species of bird

The white-winged swamp warbler (Bradypterus carpalis), also known as the white-winged scrub-warbler, is a species of Old World warbler in the family Locustellidae. It is found in Burundi, Democratic Republic of the Congo, Kenya, Rwanda, Tanzania, Uganda, and Zambia. Its natural habitat is swamps.
