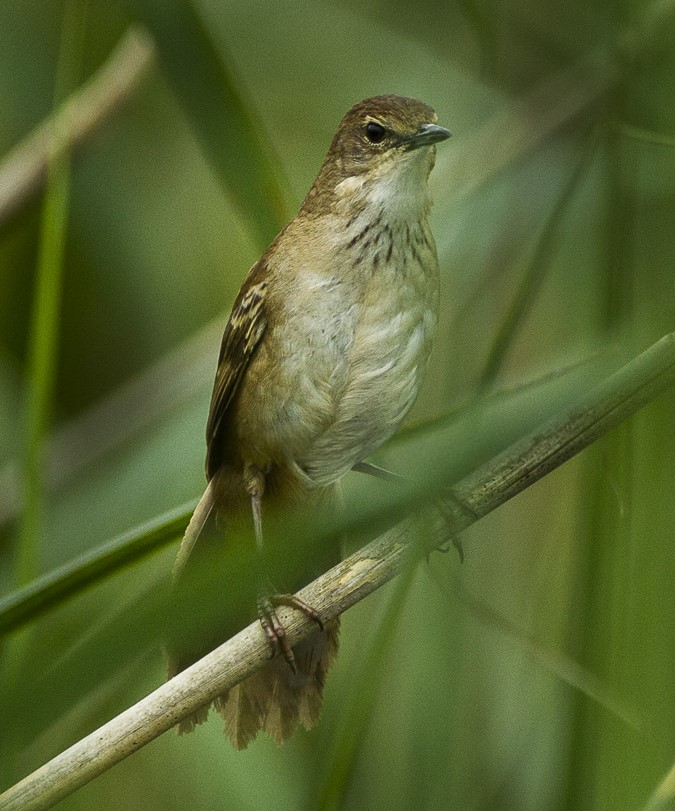
- In KwaZulu-Natal, South Africa

Conservation status
- Least Concern (IUCN 3.1)

Scientific classification
- Kingdom: Animalia
- Phylum: Chordata
- Class: Aves
- Order: Passeriformes
- Family: Locustellidae
- Genus: Bradypterus
- Species: B. baboecala

Binomial name
- Bradypterus baboecala (Vieillot, 1817)
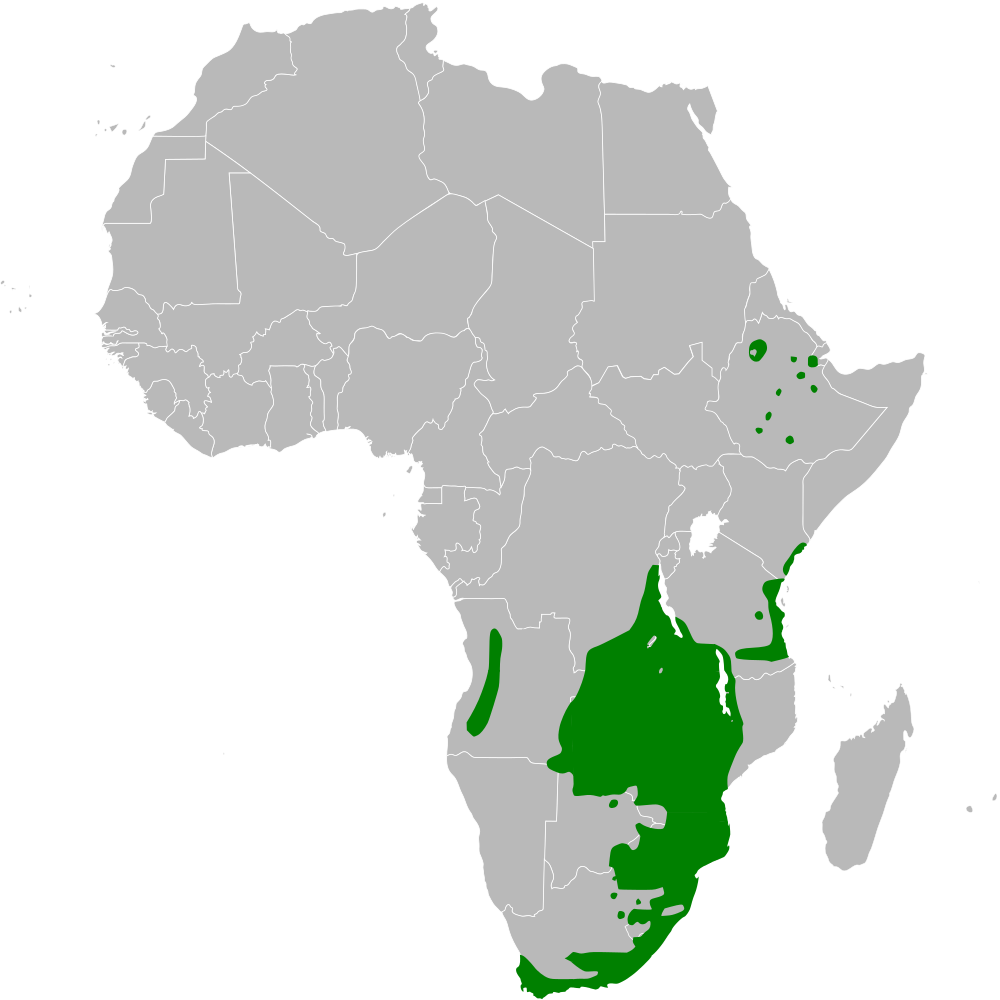
- resident range

= Little rush warbler =

Species of bird

The little rush warbler or African bush warbler (Bradypterus baboecala) is a species of Old World warbler in the family Locustellidae.

== Range and habitat ==
It is found in Angola, Botswana, Burundi, Cameroon, Chad, Republic of the Congo, DRC, Ethiopia, Kenya, Malawi, Mozambique, Namibia, Nigeria, Rwanda, South Africa, South Sudan, Eswatini, Tanzania, Togo, Uganda, Zambia, and Zimbabwe. Its natural habitat is swamps.

== Vocalization ==
Its characteristic vocalization starts slow and increases in speed; it has been described as "distinctive and loud." It occurs most often during breeding season, while raining.
