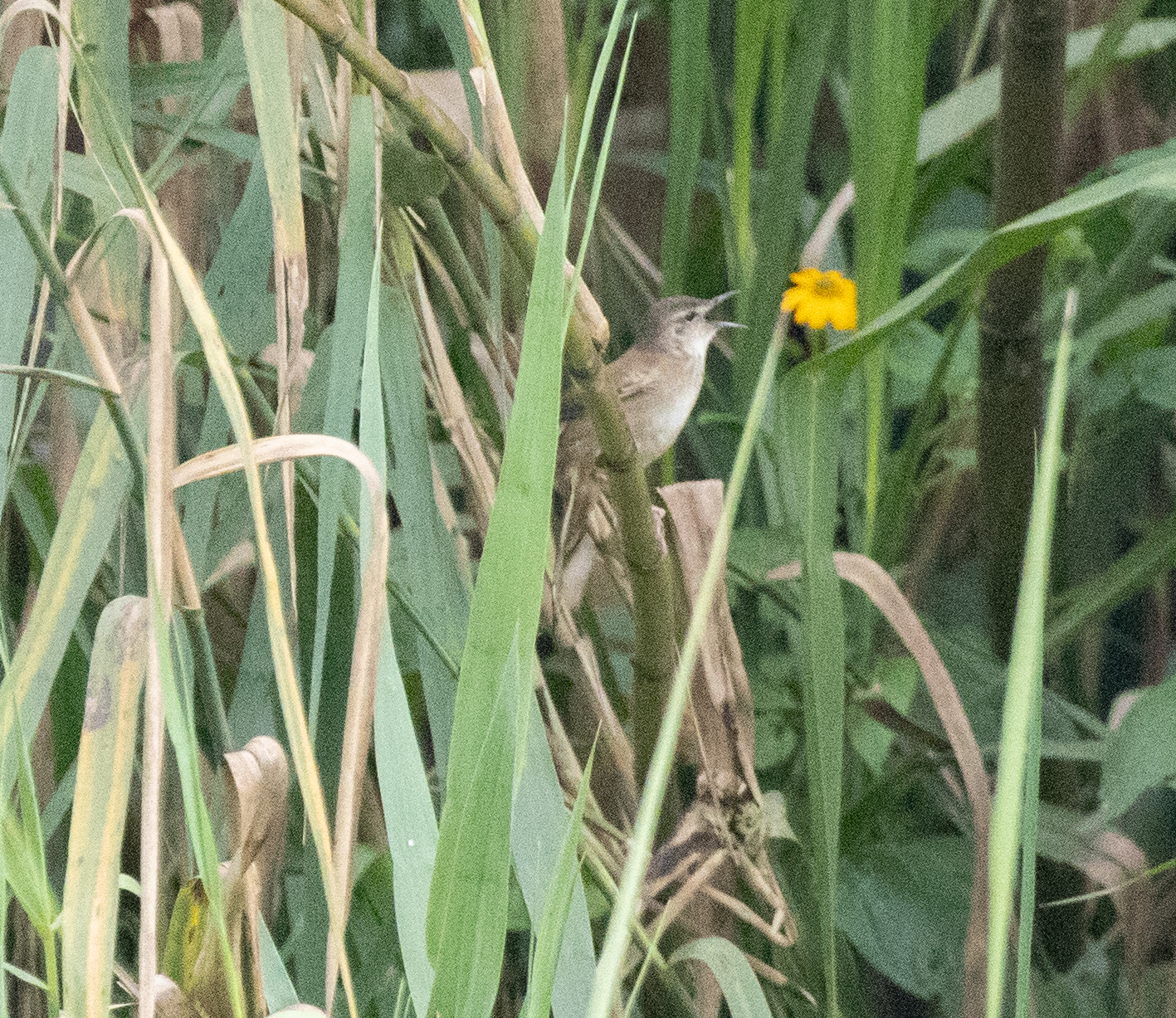

Conservation status
- Least Concern (IUCN 3.1)

Scientific classification
- Kingdom: Animalia
- Phylum: Chordata
- Class: Aves
- Order: Passeriformes
- Family: Locustellidae
- Genus: Bradypterus
- Species: B. centralis

Binomial name
- Bradypterus centralis Neumann, 1908

= Highland rush warbler =

Species of bird

The highland rush warbler (Bradypterus centralis) is a species of Old World warbler in the family Locustellidae. Although mainly present in the Albertine rift montane forests and the East African montane forests, it is sparsely distributed from Ghana to Ethiopia and Tanzania.
