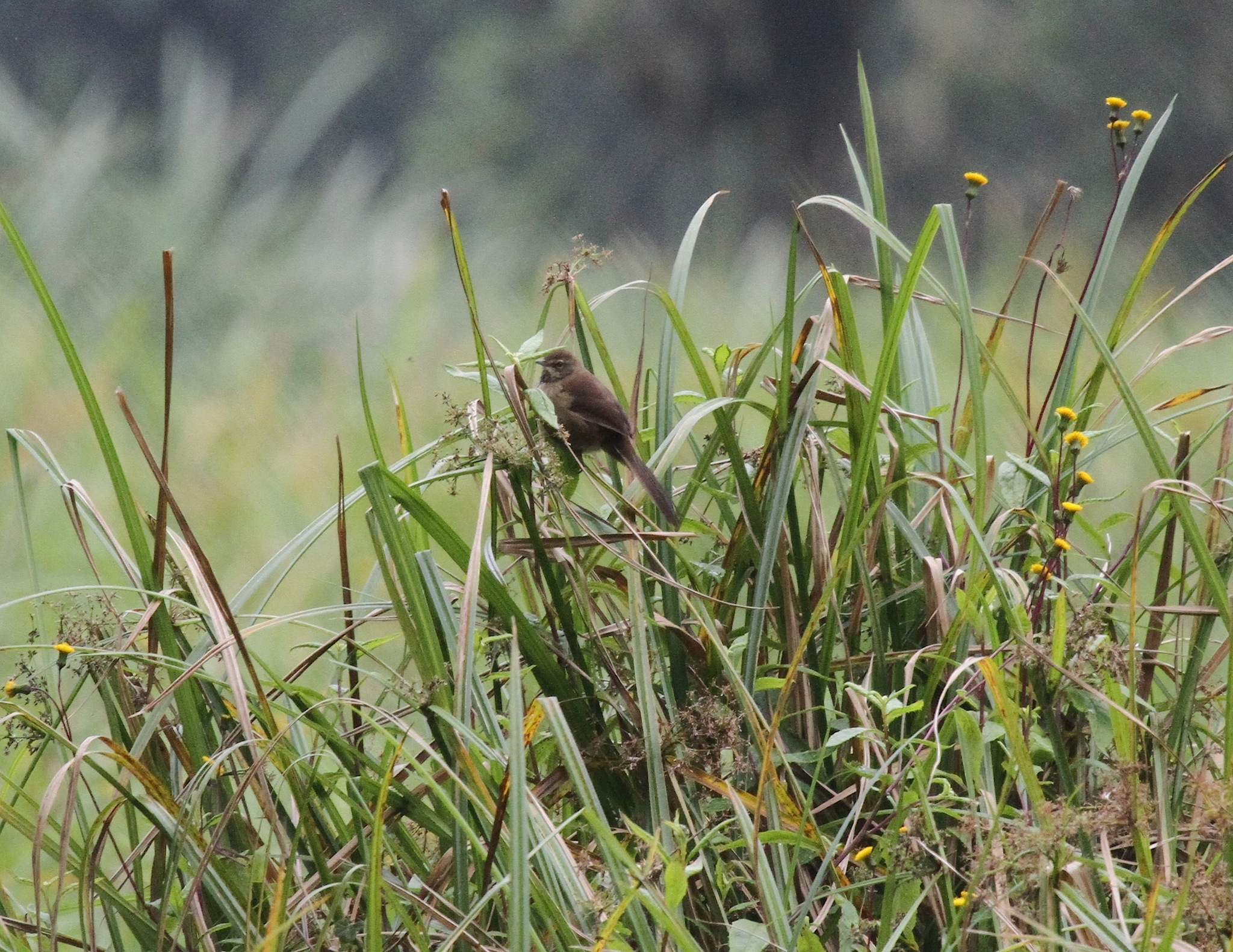

Conservation status
- Vulnerable (IUCN 3.1)

Scientific classification
- Kingdom: Animalia
- Phylum: Chordata
- Class: Aves
- Order: Passeriformes
- Family: Locustellidae
- Genus: Bradypterus
- Species: B. graueri

Binomial name
- Bradypterus graueri Neumann, 1908

= Grauer's swamp warbler =

Species of bird

Grauer's swamp warbler (Bradypterus graueri) is a species of Old World warbler in the family Locustellidae. It is native to the Albertine Rift montane forests. Its natural habitats are freshwater lakes and freshwater marshes. It is threatened by habitat loss.

Grauer's swamp warbler is endemic to the Albertine Rift and is found in montane papyrus swamps above 1900m. An investigation of the species population genetic structure revealed three clades across this region: clade 1, Virunga Volcanoes and Kigezi Highlands; clade 2, Rugege Highlands; and clade 3, Kahuzi-Biega Highlands (with clades 2 and 3 being sister groups). The divergence between these clades is thought to be a result of landscape dynamics and a historic period of aridity.

The name commemorates the German zoologist Rudolf Grauer who collected natural history specimens in the Belgian Congo.
