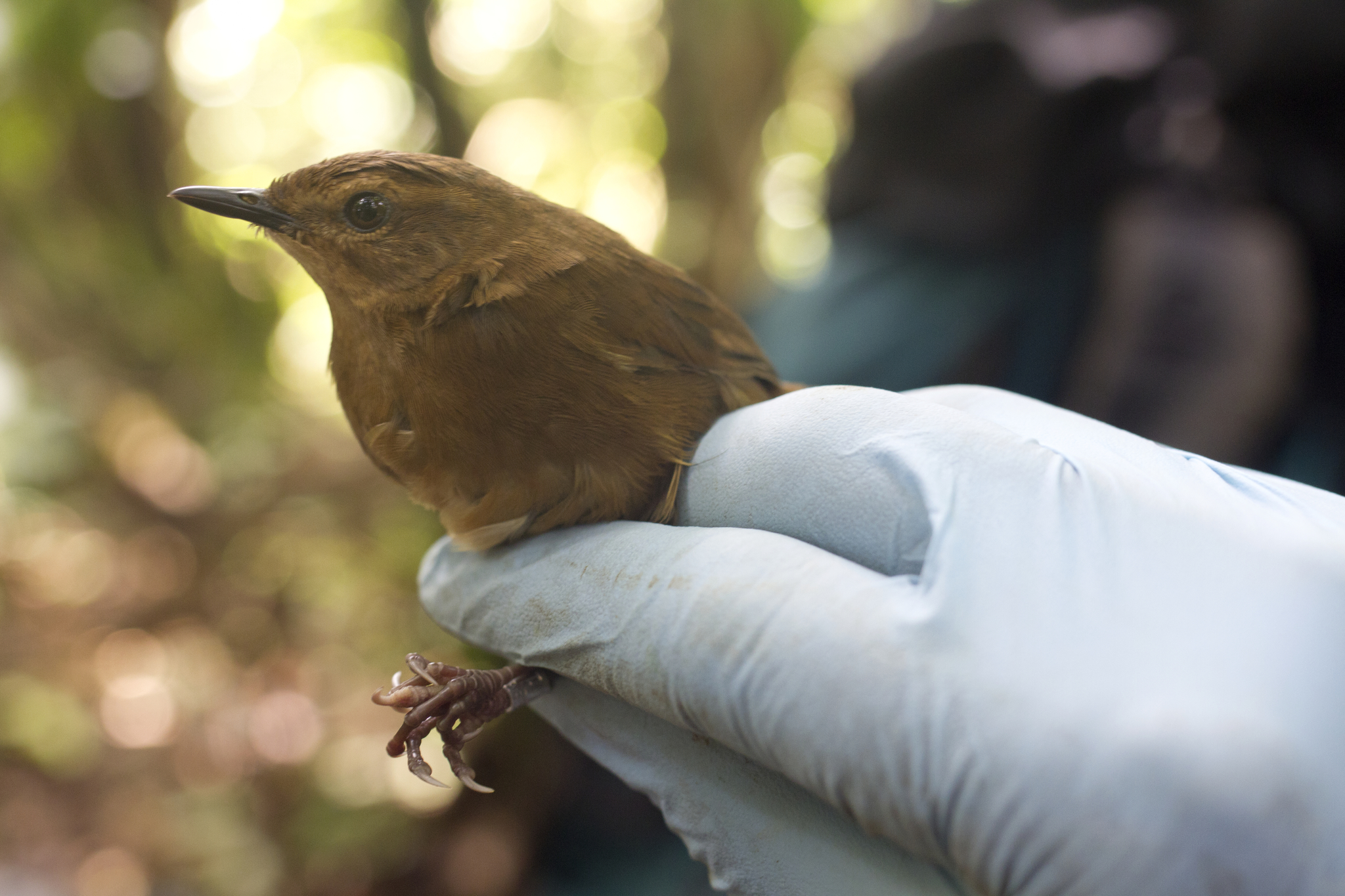

Conservation status
- Least Concern (IUCN 3.1)

Scientific classification
- Kingdom: Animalia
- Phylum: Chordata
- Class: Aves
- Order: Passeriformes
- Family: Locustellidae
- Genus: Bradypterus
- Species: B. lopezi

Binomial name
- Bradypterus lopezi (Alexander, 1903)
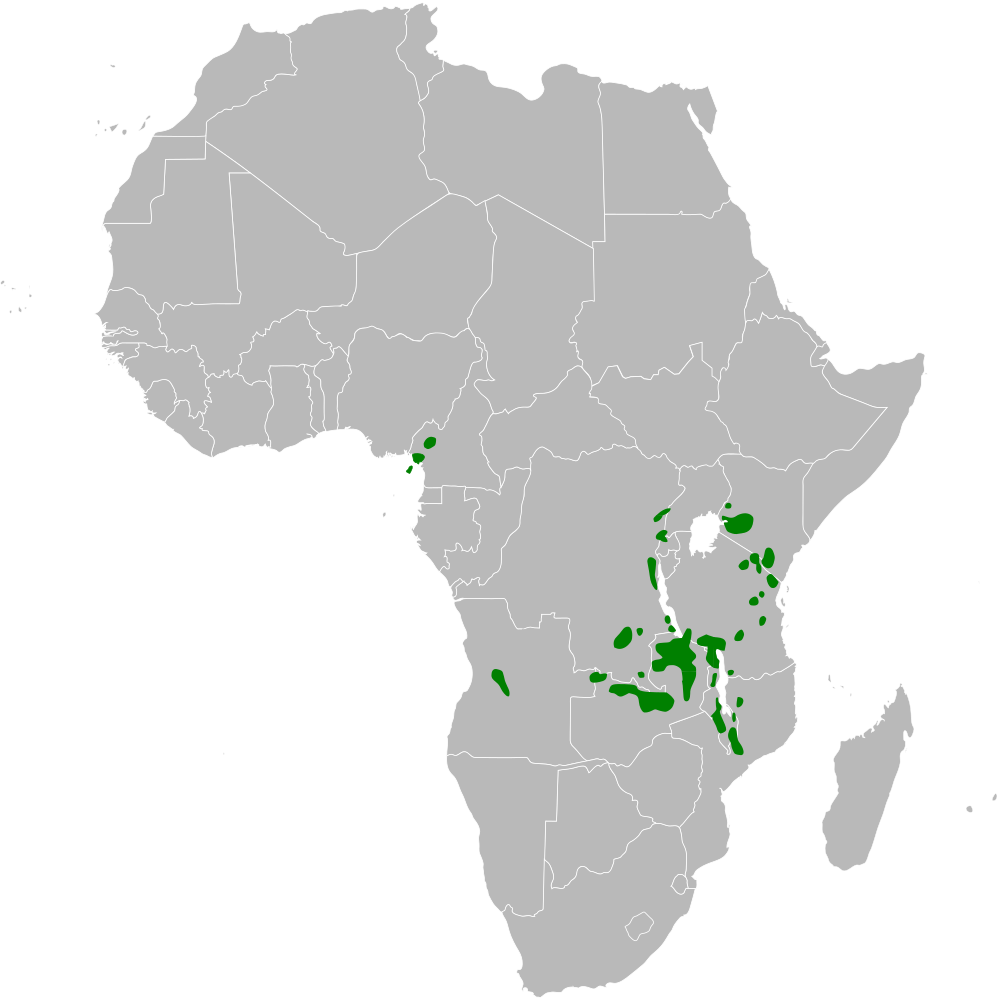

Synonyms
- Bradypterus lopesi

= Evergreen forest warbler =

Species of bird

The evergreen forest warbler or Cameroon scrub-warbler (Bradypterus lopezi) is a grass warbler species in the family Locustellidae. It was formerly included in the "Old World warbler" assemblage.

It is found in Angola, Cameroon, Democratic Republic of the Congo, Equatorial Guinea, Kenya, Malawi, Mozambique, Rwanda, Tanzania, Uganda, and Zambia. Its natural habitats are subtropical or tropical moist montane forests and subtropical or tropical moist shrubland.

It has a subspecies, Bradypterus lopezi mariae, found in central and western Kenya to northern Tanzania.
