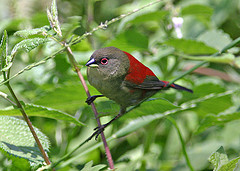
- A male Abyssinian crimsonwing (Cryptospiza salvadorii)

Scientific classification
- Kingdom: Animalia
- Phylum: Chordata
- Class: Aves
- Order: Passeriformes
- Family: Estrildidae
- Genus: Cryptospiza; Salvadori, 1884

Type species
- Pytelia reichenovii Hartlaub, 1874

Species
- C. reichenovii; C. salvadorii; C. jacksoni; C. shelleyi

= Crimsonwing =

Crimsonwings

Genus of birds

The crimsonwings (Cryptospiza) are a genus of small passerine birds belonging to the estrildid finch family, Estrildidae. There are four species. They are found in parts of Sub-Saharan Africa, particularly the Albertine Rift; all four species occur there and two, Shelley's and dusky crimsonwings, are found nowhere else. They are secretive birds which mainly inhabit mountain forests with dense undergrowth. They usually forage on or near the ground, feeding mainly on seeds such as those of grasses and balsam.

They are 11–13 cm long with short wings and a short, rounded tail. The bill is thick and conical and either black or red. They all have a reddish back and rump and olive or grey underparts. Juvenile birds are duller than the adults.

Destruction and degradation of their forest habitat is a potential threat to the crimsonwings and Shelley's crimsonwing is classified as vulnerable by the IUCN.

== Taxonomy ==
The genus Cryptospiza was introduced in 1884 by the Italian zoologist Tommaso Salvadori with Pytelia reichenovii Hartlaub, the red-faced crimsonwing, as the type species. The genus name combines the Ancient Greek κρυπτος/kruptos meaning "hidden" or "obscure" with σπιζα/spiza meaning "finch".

== Species list ==
The genus contains the following four species.

Image	Common name	Scientific name	Distribution
	Red-faced crimsonwing	Cryptospiza reichenovii	Bioko and the Western High Plateau, the Albertine Rift montane forests and east Africa.
	Abyssinian crimsonwing	Cryptospiza salvadorii	highlands of East Africa
	Dusky crimsonwing	Cryptospiza jacksoni	Albertine Rift montane forests
	Shelley's crimsonwing	Cryptospiza shelleyi	Albertine Rift montane forests
