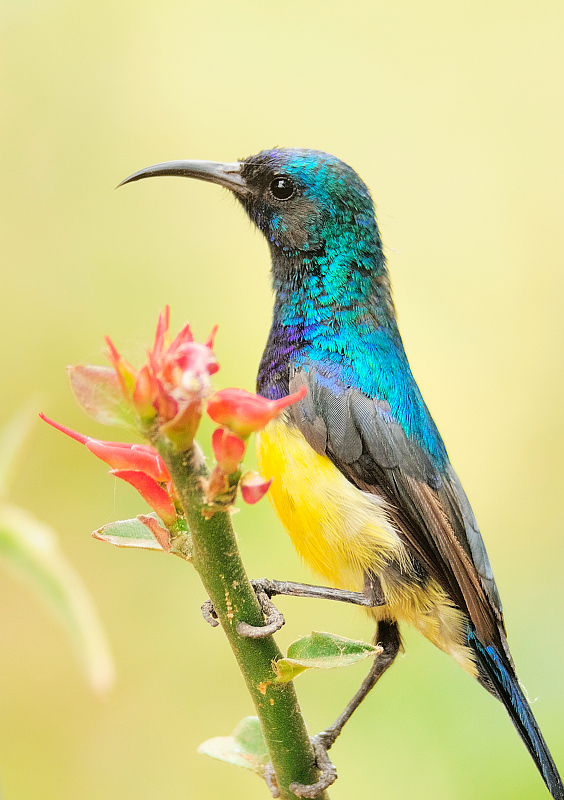
- Male in the Serengeti, Tanzania

Conservation status
- Least Concern (IUCN 3.1)

Scientific classification
- Kingdom: Animalia
- Phylum: Chordata
- Class: Aves
- Order: Passeriformes
- Family: Nectariniidae
- Genus: Cinnyris
- Species: C. venustus

Binomial name
- Cinnyris venustus (Shaw, 1799)

= Variable sunbird =

Species of bird

The variable sunbird or yellow-bellied sunbird (Cinnyris venustus), formerly Nectarinia venusta, is a sunbird. The sunbirds are a group of small Old World passerine birds which feed largely on nectar, although they will also take insects, especially when feeding young. Flight is fast and direct on their short wings. Most species can take nectar by hovering like a hummingbird, but usually perch to feed most of the time.

The variable sunbird is a fairly common resident breeder in equatorial Africa. Two eggs are laid in a suspended nest in a tree. This species is found in open woodland and cultivation.

Variable sunbirds are small, only 10 cm long. They have medium-length thin down-curved bills and brush-tipped tubular tongues, both adaptations to their nectar feeding.

The adult male has a glossy green head, throat and nape, and a maroon breast band. In most subspecies, the belly of the male is yellow, but in a few it is orange or white. The female has grey-brown upperparts and yellowish underparts, and an obvious pale supercilium. The eclipse male is like the female, but shows some green, especially on the throat. The call is a clear tew-tew-tew-tew-tew.

== Gallery ==
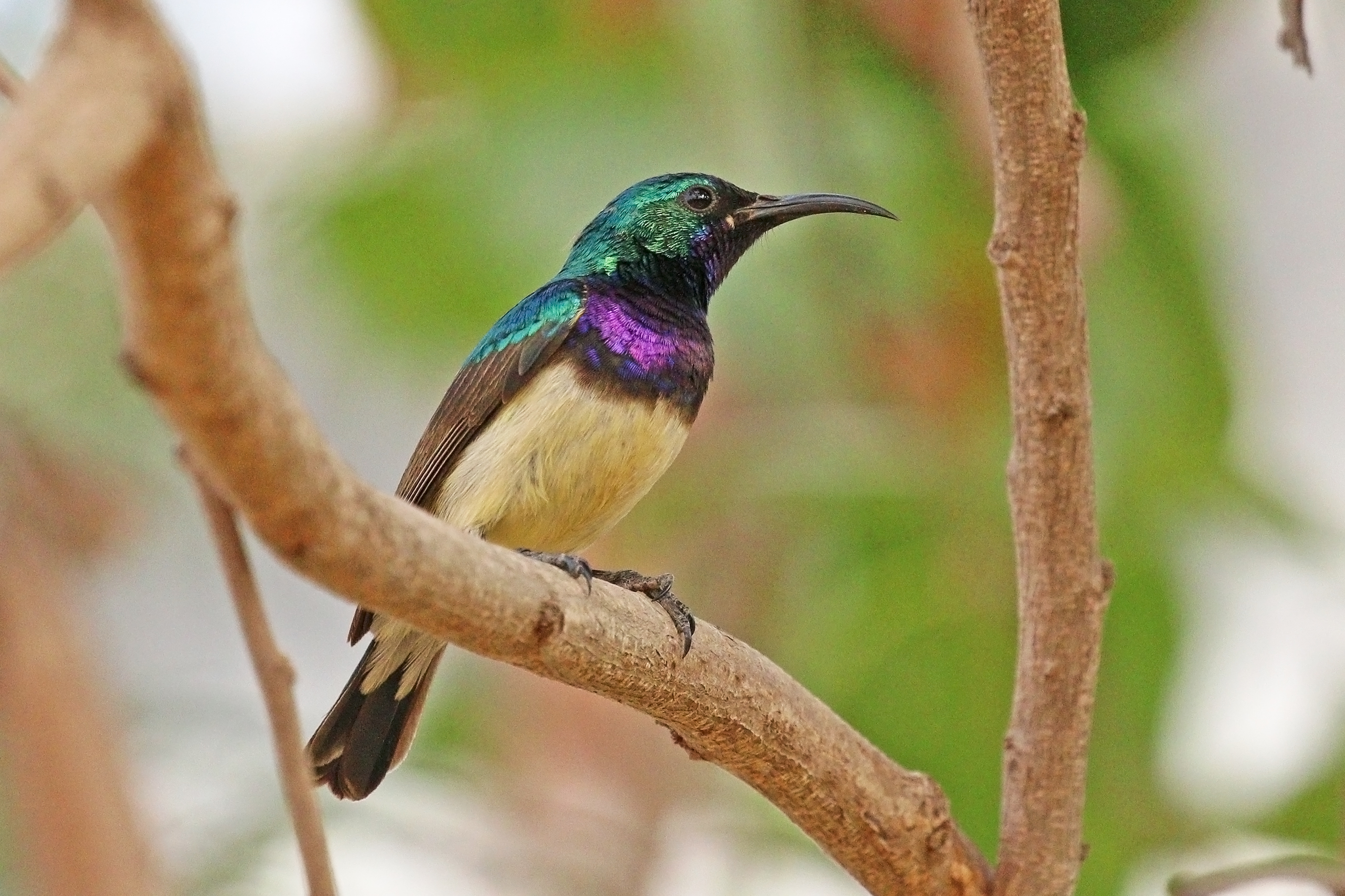
male C. v. venustus, Gambia

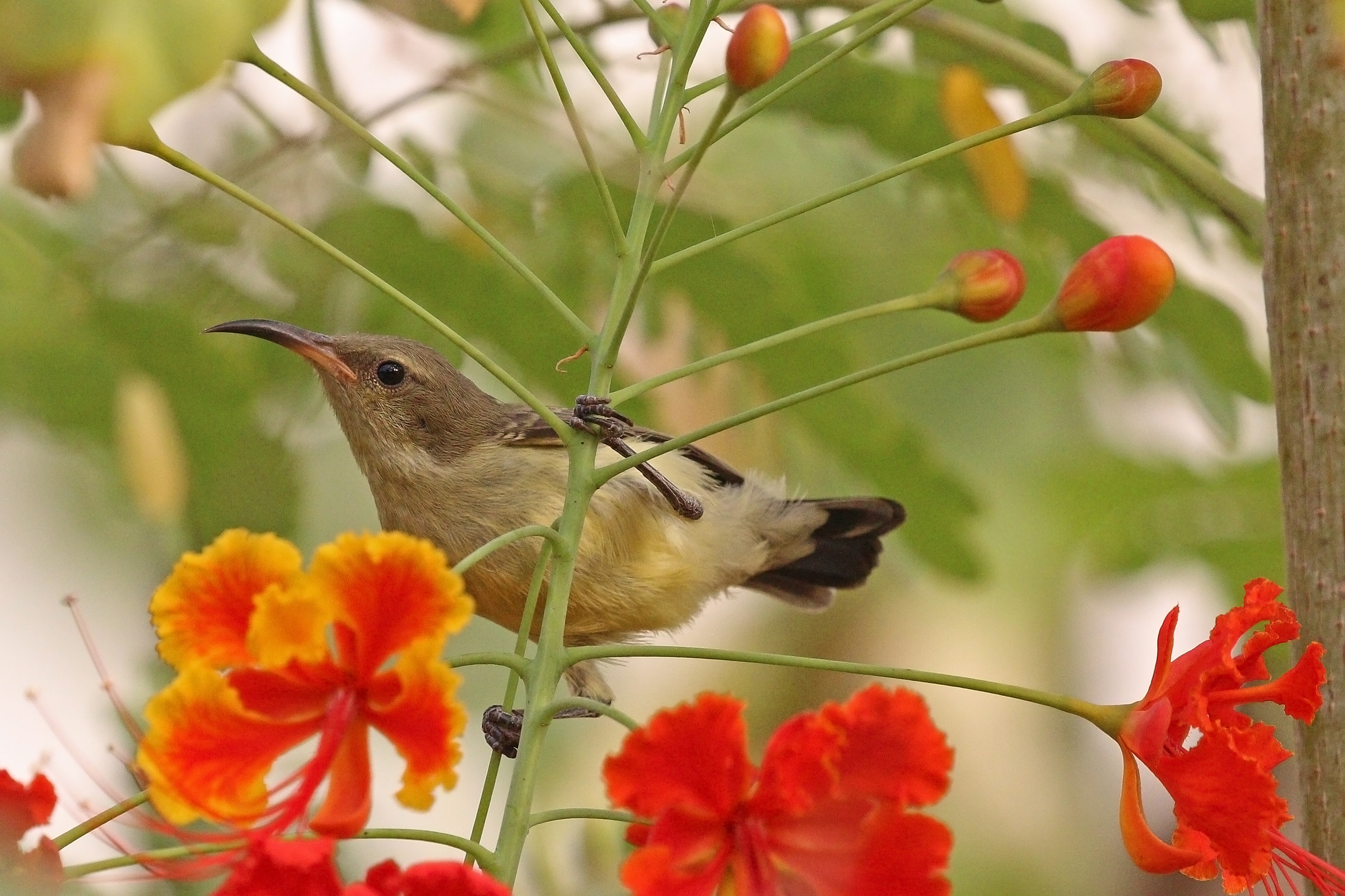
juvenile C. v. venustus, Gambia

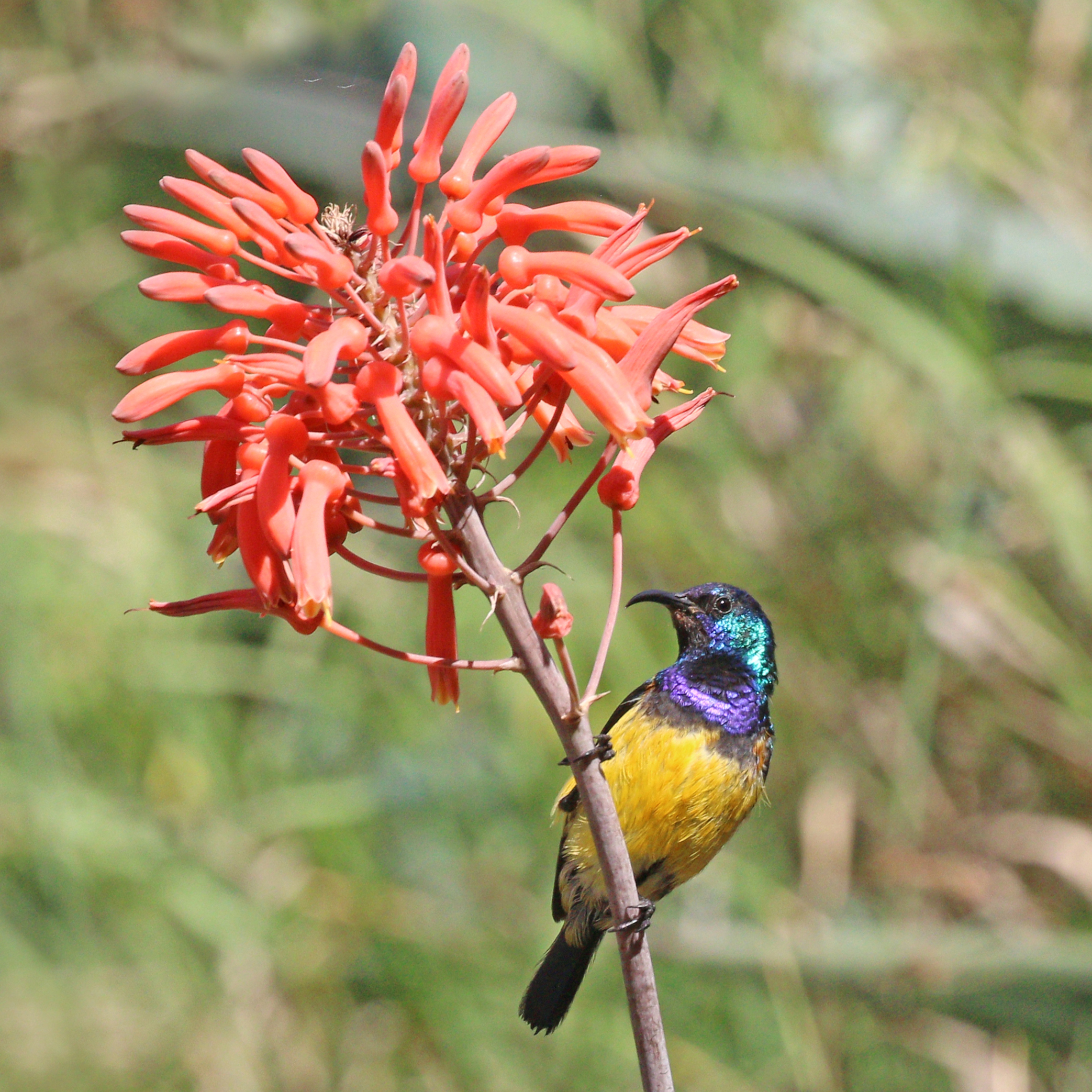
male C. v. falkensteini, Kenya

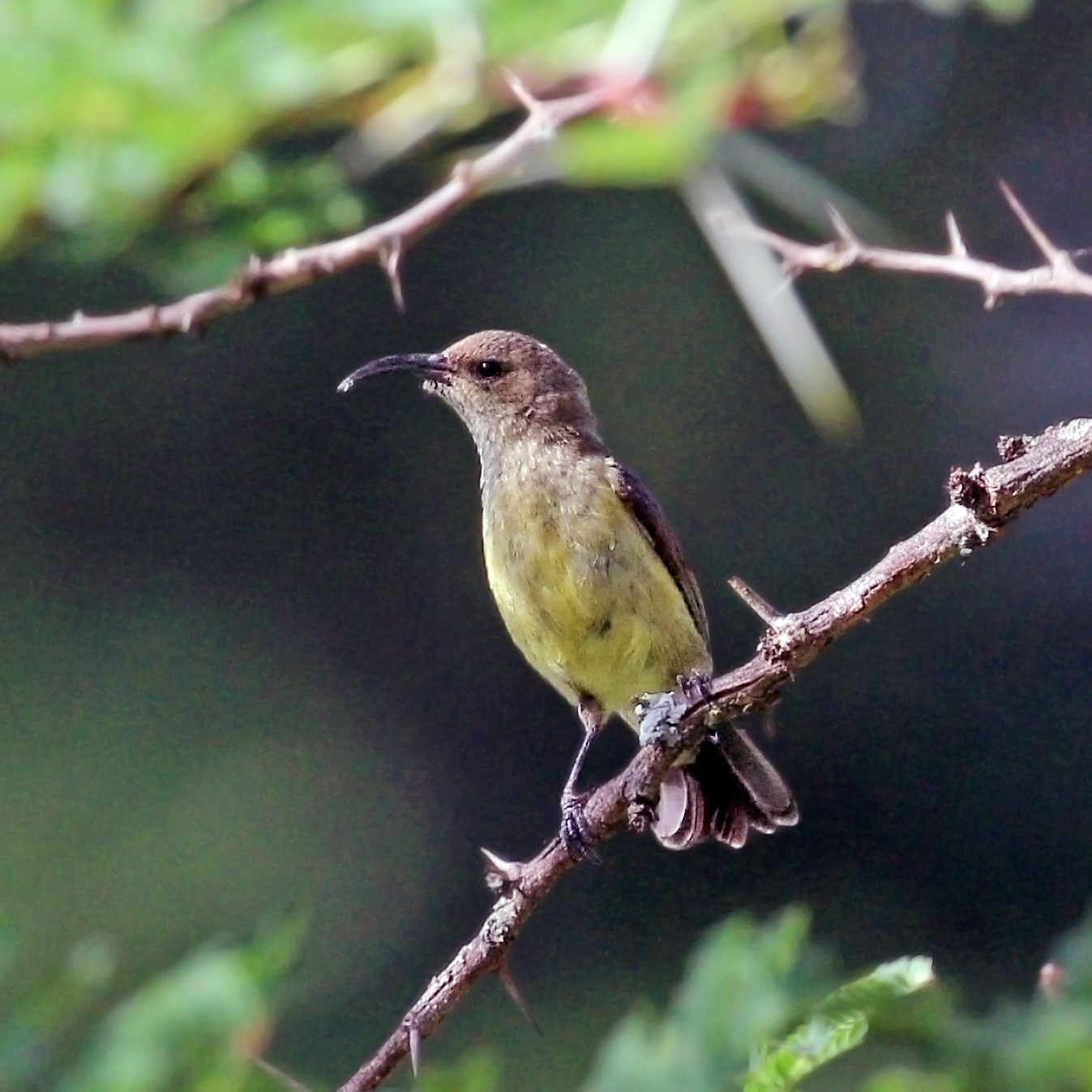
female C. v. falkensteini, Kenya
