= Red-faced crimsonwing =

Conservation status
- Least Concern (IUCN 3.1)

Scientific classification
- Kingdom: Animalia
- Phylum: Chordata
- Class: Aves
- Order: Passeriformes
- Family: Estrildidae
- Genus: Cryptospiza
- Species: C. reichenovii

Binomial name
- Cryptospiza reichenovii (Hartlaub, 1874)

Species of bird

The red-faced crimsonwing (Cryptospiza reichenovii) is a common species of estrildid finch found in Africa. It has an estimated global extent of occurrence of 390,000 km^{2}.

It is native to the Afromontane.

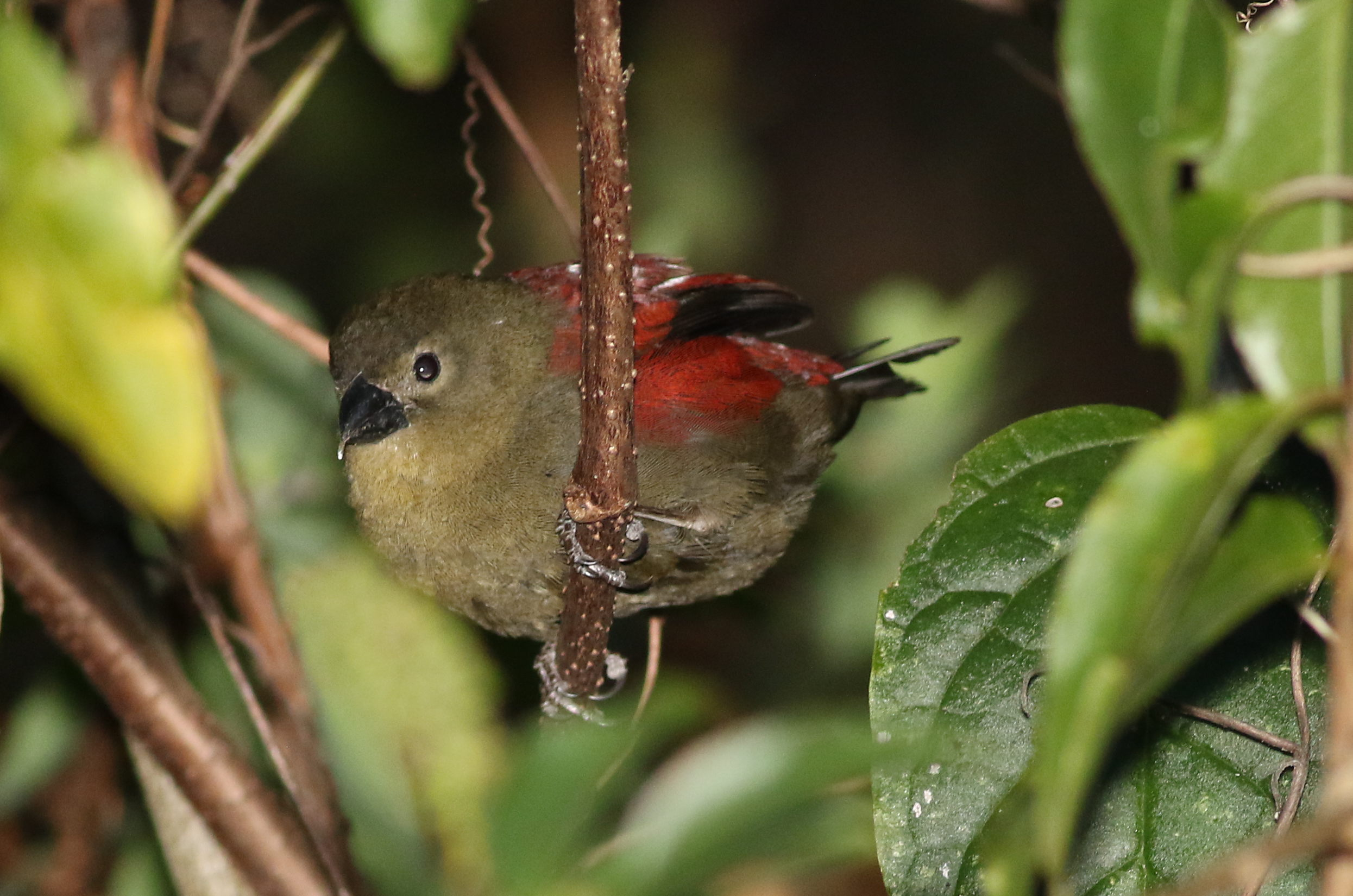
female bird

== Taxonomy ==
The red-faced crimsonwing was formally described in 1874 by the German ornithologist Gustav Hartlaub based on a female specimen that had been collected by Anton Reichenow near Bondongo (Bonjongo) in west Cameroon, West Africa. Hartlaub coined the binomial name Pytelia reichenovii where the specific epithet was chosen to honour the collector. The red-faced crimsonwing is now one of four species placed in the genus Cryptospiza that was introduced in 1884 by the Italian zoologist Tommaso Salvadori.

Three subspecies are recognised:

- C. r. reichenovii (Hartlaub, 1874) – Western High Plateau and Bioko
- C. r. ocularis Sharpe, 1902 – Albertine Rift montane forests
- C. r. australis Shelley, 1896 – eastern Arc forests and Malawi
