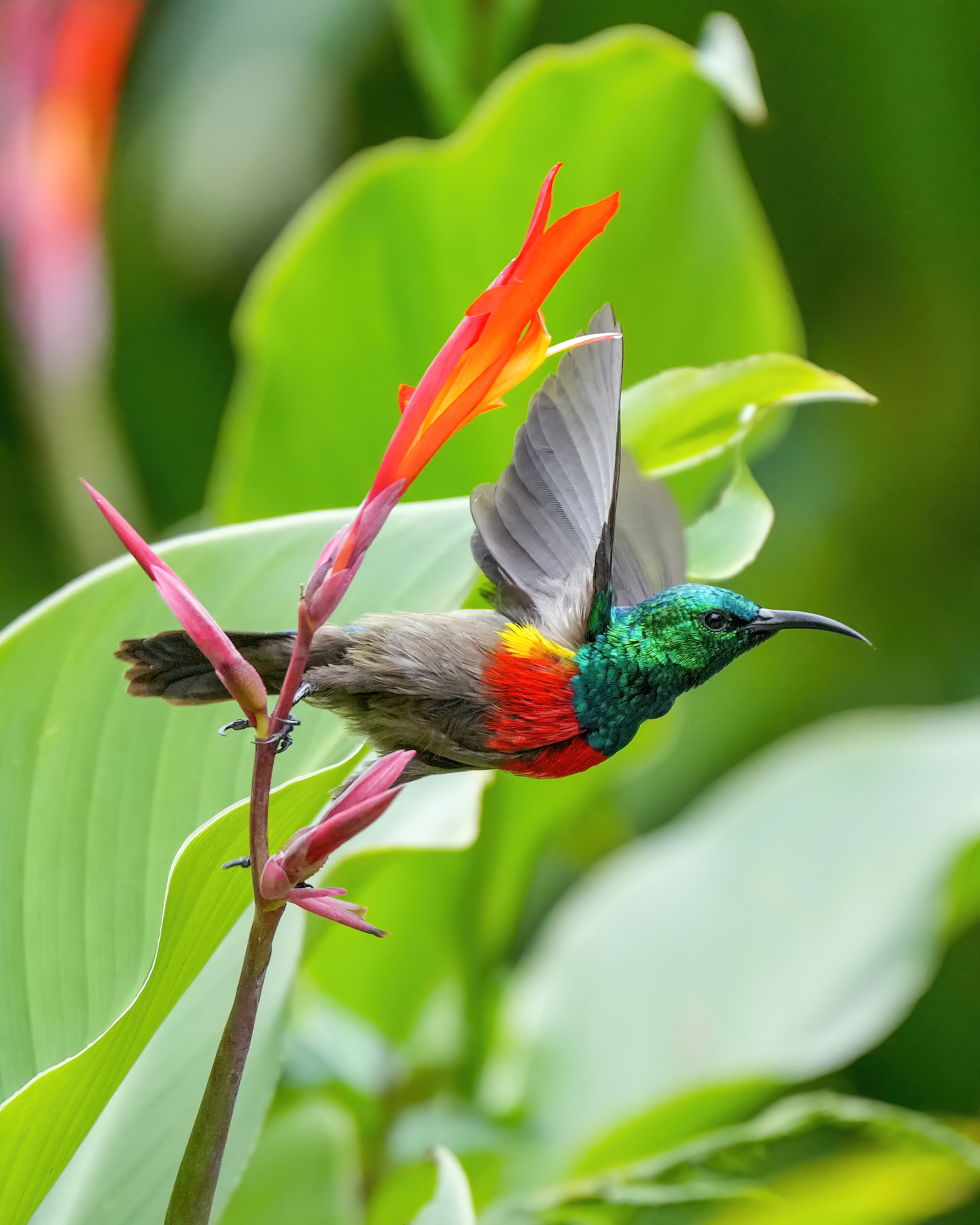

Conservation status
- Least Concern (IUCN 3.1)

Scientific classification
- Kingdom: Animalia
- Phylum: Chordata
- Class: Aves
- Order: Passeriformes
- Family: Nectariniidae
- Genus: Cinnyris
- Species: C. chloropygius

Binomial name
- Cinnyris chloropygius (Jardine, 1842)

Synonyms
- Cinnyris chloropygia; Nectarinia chloropygia

= Olive-bellied sunbird =

Species of bird

The olive-bellied sunbird (Cinnyris chloropygius) is a species of bird in the family Nectariniidae. It is widely spread across the African tropical rainforest primarily throughout West and Central Africa, but is also found in Southern and East Africa.

== Description ==
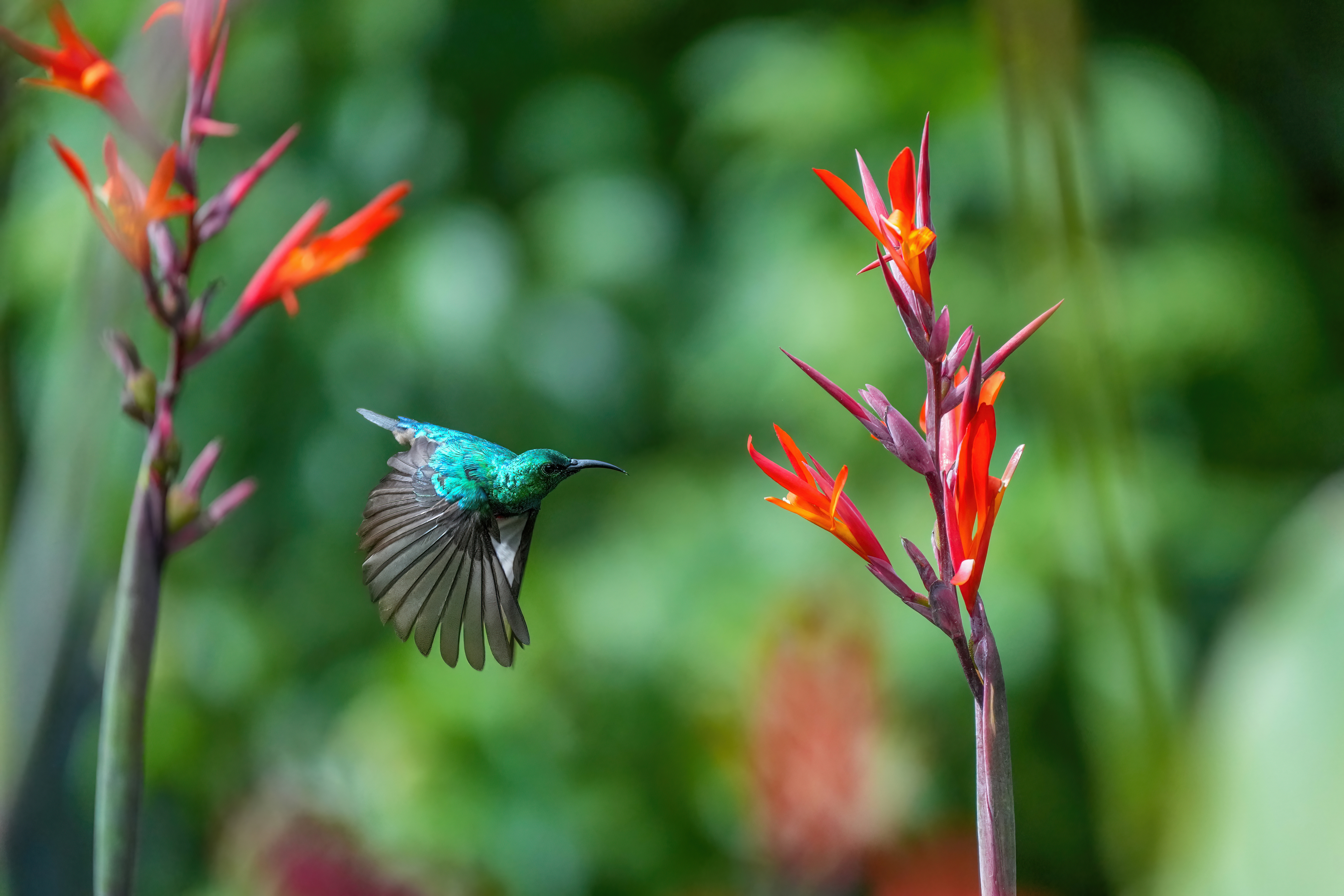
Olive-bellied sunbird (male) in flight

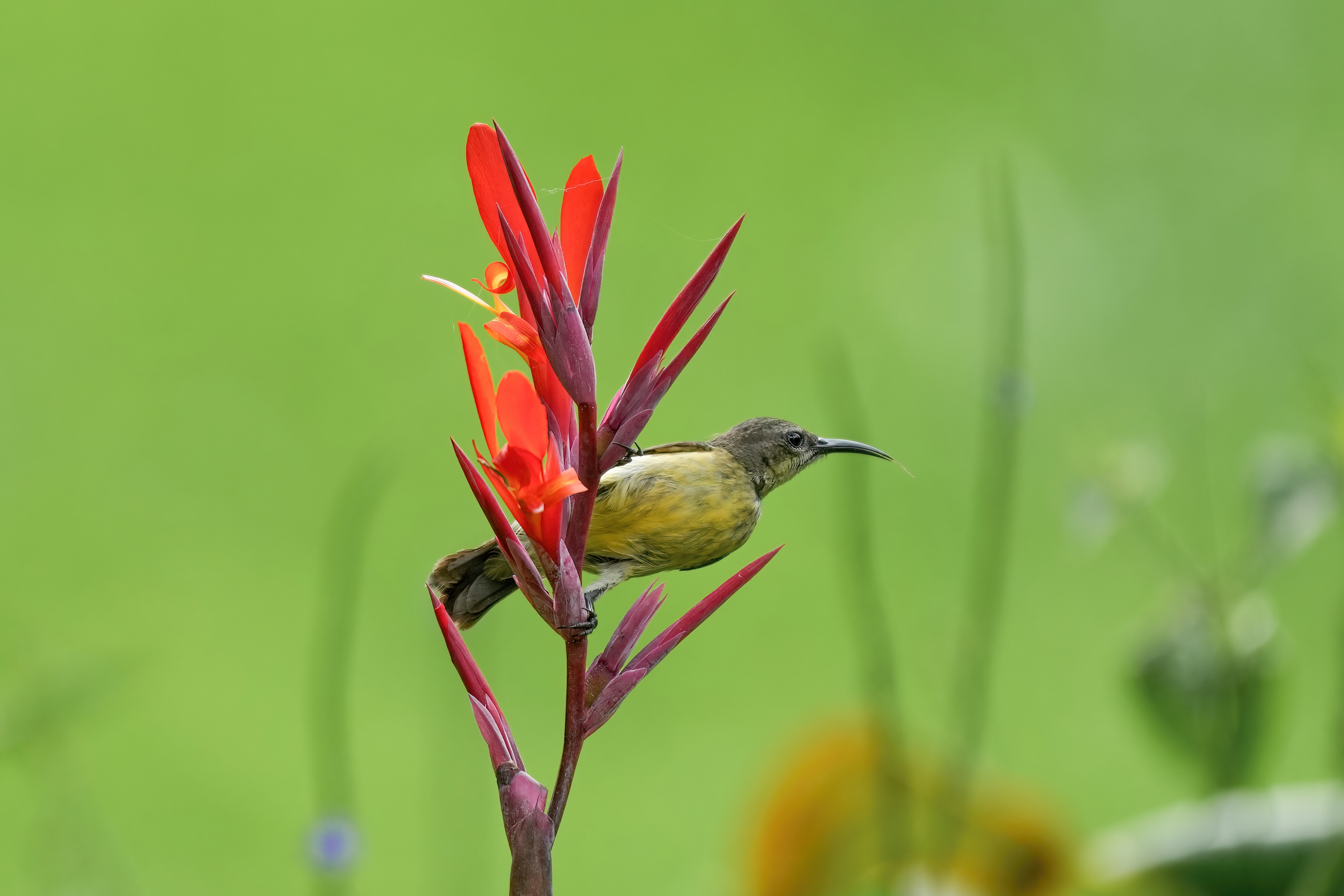
Olive-bellied sunbird (female) in Uganda

The olive-bellied sunbird is a small species, and very similar to the tiny sunbird (Cinnyris minullus) in appearance. The adult male has a metallic green head, back and throat, dark brown wings, a metallic blue rump and a black tail with a purplish-blue sheen. It has a narrow blue breast band above a wider scarlet breast patch, lemon-yellow pectoral tufts and an olive belly. It differs from the slightly smaller tiny sunbird in having a larger beak and no blue bars among the red breast plumage. The adult female has an olive-brown head and upper parts, dark brown wings and dark brown tail. The underparts are olive washed with yellow, and are yellower and less streaked than the tiny sunbird.

== Ecology ==
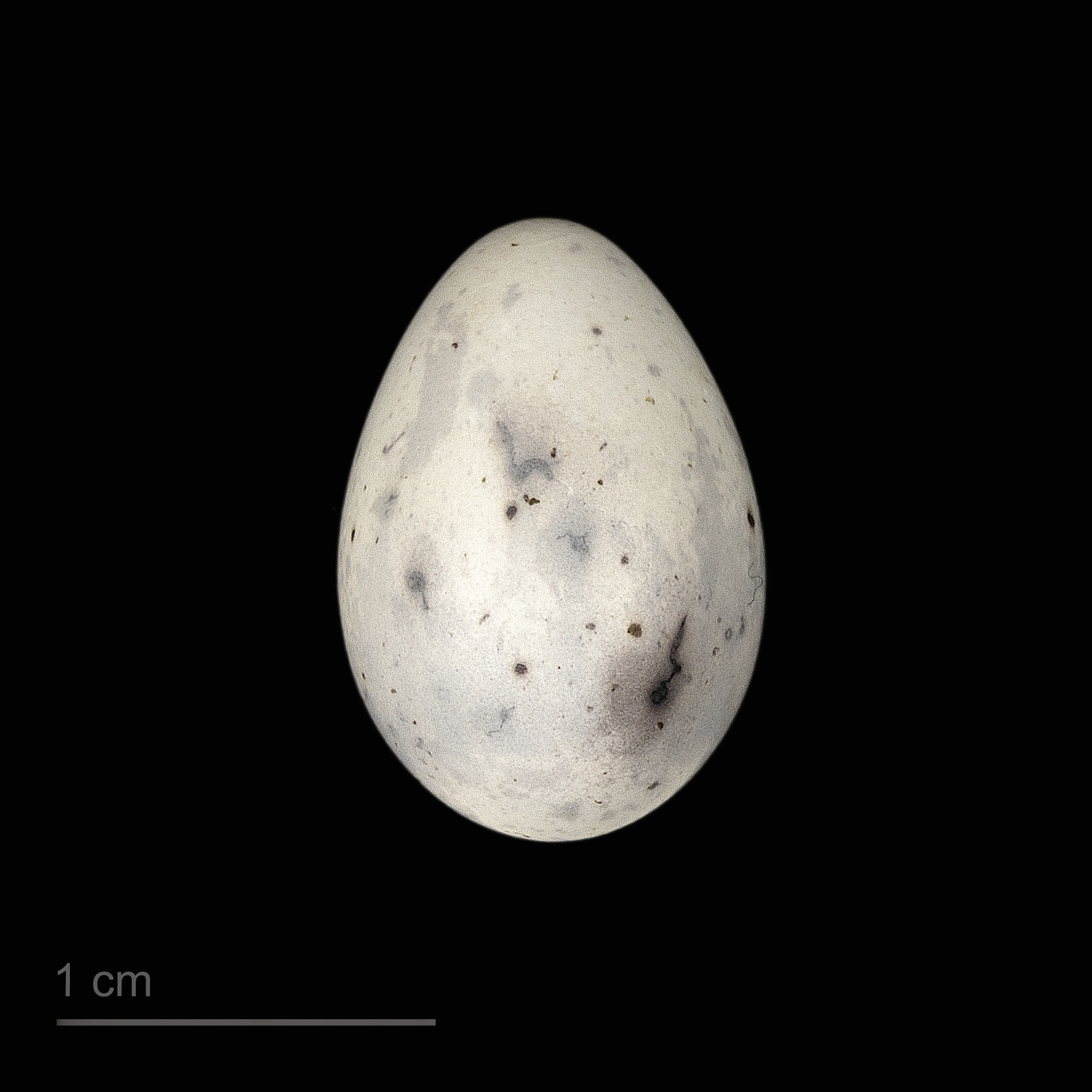
Cinnyris chloropygius - MHNT

The olive-bellied sunbird moves about singly or in pairs, or sometimes in groups of about six birds. It forages in the lower parts of the canopy, feeding on caterpillars, beetles, spiders, nectar, flowers and seeds. The male is territorial and will drive away members of its species as well as tiny sunbirds. The nest is a straggly affair formed from grasses, strips of bark and leaves, and lined with fine material. Incubation is done entirely by the female.

== Status ==
The olive-bellied sunbird is a common species with a very wide range. Although the population trend is thought to be declining as a result of declinging forest cover, the decline is not fast enough to be alarming. No particular threats have been identified and the International Union for Conservation of Nature has assessed the bird's conservation status as being of "least concern".
