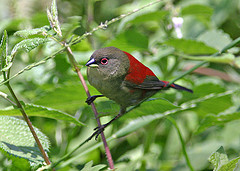
- A male photographed in Tanzania

Conservation status
- Least Concern (IUCN 3.1)

Scientific classification
- Kingdom: Animalia
- Phylum: Chordata
- Class: Aves
- Order: Passeriformes
- Family: Estrildidae
- Genus: Cryptospiza
- Species: C. salvadorii

Binomial name
- Cryptospiza salvadorii Reichenow, 1892

= Abyssinian crimsonwing =

Species of bird

The Abyssinian crimsonwing (Cryptospiza salvadorii), also known as the Ethiopian crimsonwing, Salvadori's crimsonwing or crimson-backed forest finch, is a common species of estrildid finch found in eastern Africa. It has an estimated global extent of occurrence of 190,000 km^{2} (73,000 mi^{2}).

== Description ==
The Abyssinian crimsonwing is a small, shy, greyish olive finch with bright crimson wings, mantle, back and rump. It is sexually dimorphic. In the males the head and upper mantle are greyish olive apart from the blackish lores, while the rest of the upper parts, except for the short, rounded, black tail, are deep crimson. The chin is dull yellow and the rest of the underparts are greyish-olive, with some flank feathers having red tips. The bill is black, and the eyes and legs are dark brown. The females is similar to the male, but duller red above and pale olive below. The juveniles are browner above with only patches of red colour. It measures 10–11 cm (3.9–4.3 in) in length and weighs 10.9–14 g (0.38–0.49 oz).

=== Voice ===
The call of the Abyssinian crimsonwing is a soft "tsip-tsip" which is given when the bird is flushed. The song is the call repeated but with a soft melodic sub-song which is rarely heard.

== Distribution and subspecies ==
There are currently three recognised subspecies; a fourth C.s. crystallochresta which was described from Challa, in south western Ethiopia has been lumped in to the nominate subspecies. The three subspecies and their distributions are:

- Cryptospiza salvadorii salvadorii Reichenow, 1892: Ethiopia and northern Kenya
- Cryptospiza salvadorii kilimensis Moreau & W. L. Sclater, 1934: southern South Sudan, eastern Uganda, western, central and southern Kenya and northern Tanzania
- Cryptospiza salvadorii ruwenzori W. L. Sclater, 1925: mountains of Albertine Rift in eastern Democratic Republic of Congo, south western Uganda, western Rwanda and western Burundi

== Habitat and habits ==
The Abyssinian crimsonwing occurs in forest, particularly montane forest, from 1,500 to 300 m (4,920 to 980 ft) above sea level in Kenya, at the forest edge or in clearings where it normally remains among the undergrowth but sometimes seen higher in creepers. It also occurs in bamboo, thickets and dense brush, especially along watercourses.

It is a shy and rather elusive species which is easily alarmed, retreating into cover rapidly at the first indication of a threat. This means that it may be less uncommon than it appears. It is usually observed singly or in pairs, but small family parties have been reported. It feeds low down, often within cover, mainly on grass seeds, but other small seeds, such as Setaria spp, balsam Impatiens spp and stinging nettles Laportea spp, are also consumed. It may possibly also catch a few insects.

There are records of Abyssinian crimsonwing showing breeding behaviour from April and August in Ethiopia, while in Uganda it breeds in March at Bwindi and on Mount Elgon it breeds in June and November. All records of breeding behaviour are in dry months following rains.

== Name ==
The binomial name and the alternative common name, Salvadori's crimsonwing, honour the Italian ornithologist Count Adelardo Tommaso Salvadori Paleotti, known as Tommaso Salvadori.
