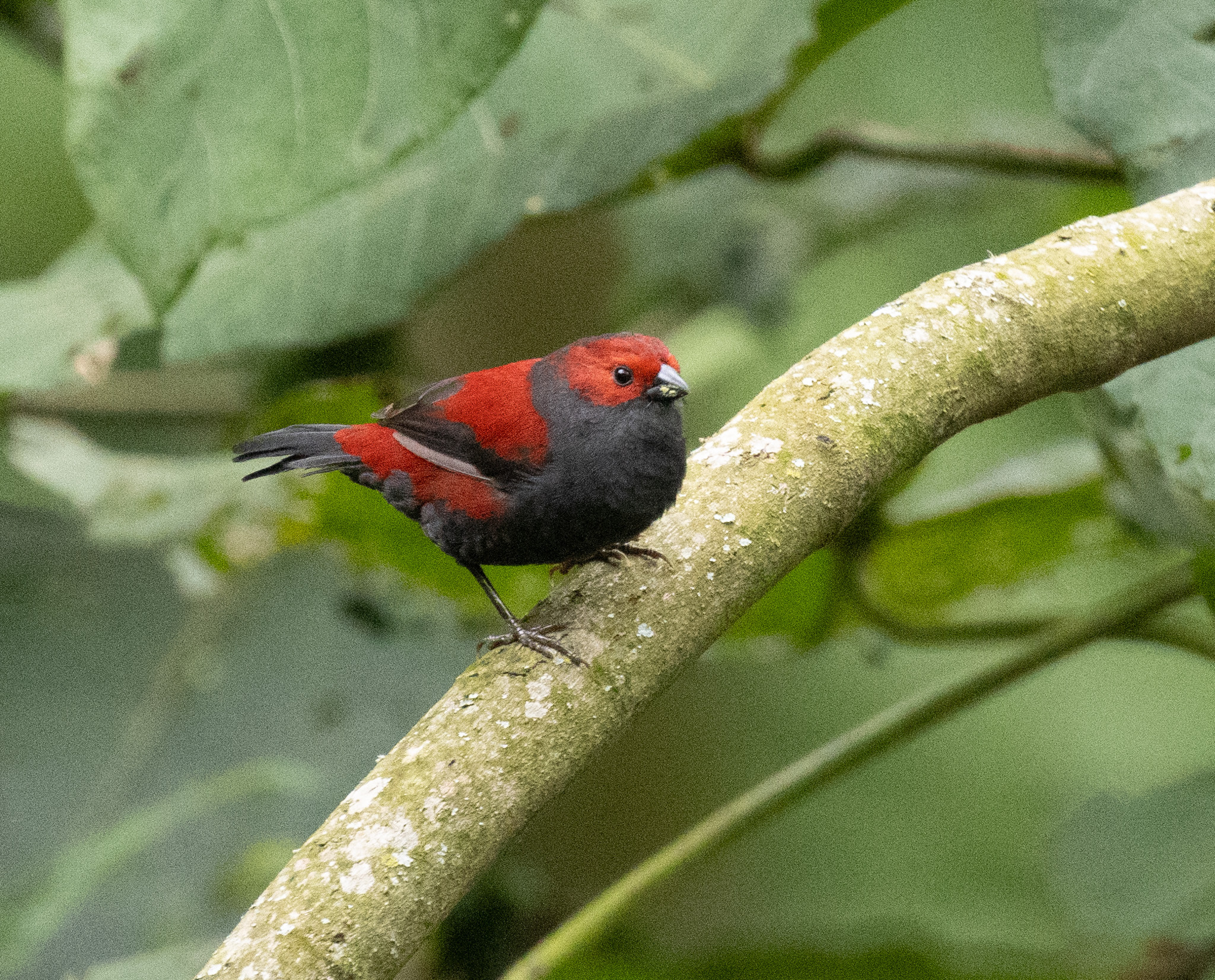

Conservation status
- Least Concern (IUCN 3.1)

Scientific classification
- Kingdom: Animalia
- Phylum: Chordata
- Class: Aves
- Order: Passeriformes
- Family: Estrildidae
- Genus: Cryptospiza
- Species: C. jacksoni

Binomial name
- Cryptospiza jacksoni Sharpe, 1902

= Dusky crimsonwing =

Species of bird

The dusky crimsonwing (Cryptospiza jacksoni) is a common species of estrildid finch found in Africa. It has an estimated global extent of occurrence of 78,000 km^{2}.

It is found in the Albertine Rift montane forests.

The binomial name commemorates the English explorer Frederick John Jackson.
