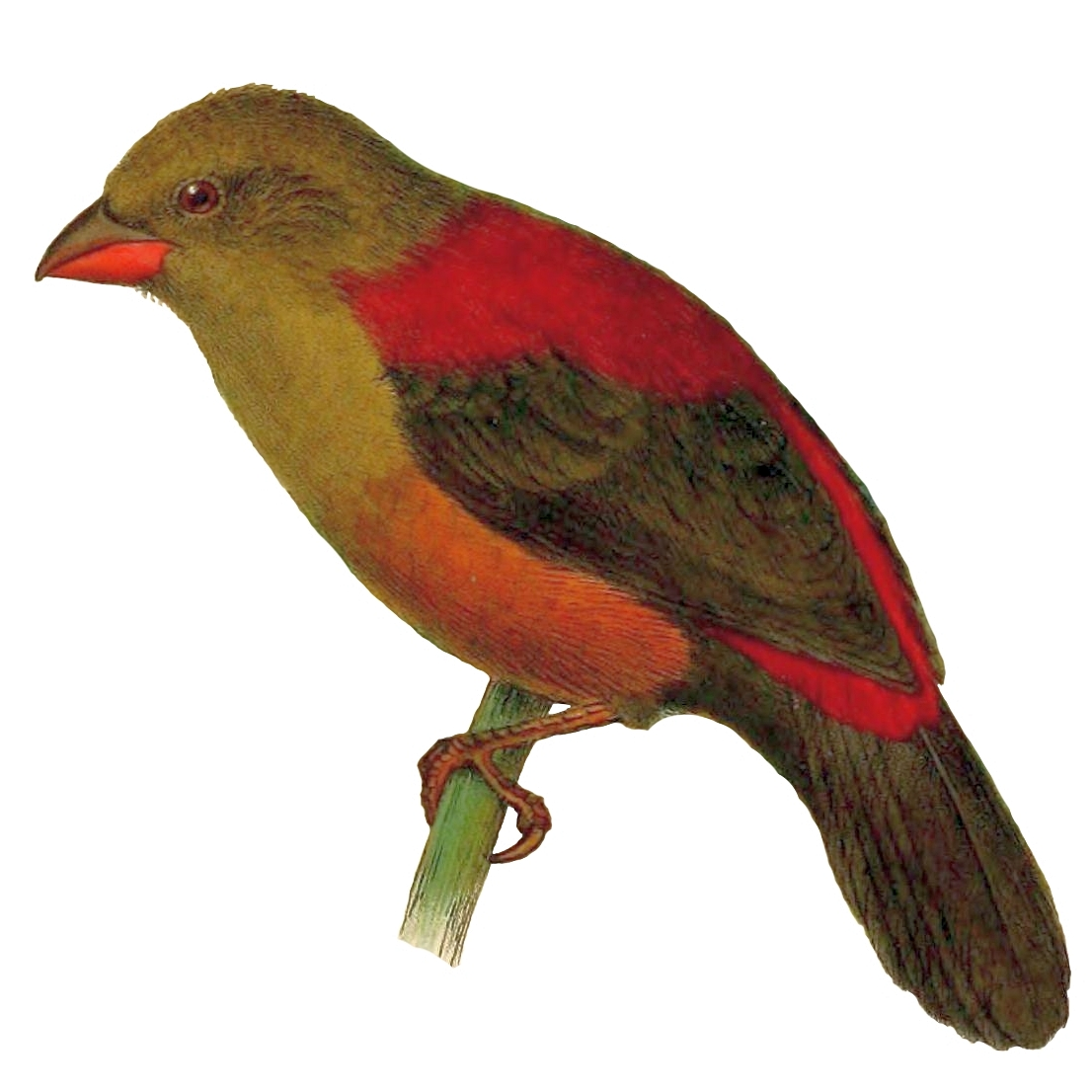

Conservation status
- Endangered (IUCN 3.1)

Scientific classification
- Kingdom: Animalia
- Phylum: Chordata
- Class: Aves
- Order: Passeriformes
- Family: Estrildidae
- Genus: Cryptospiza
- Species: C. shelleyi

Binomial name
- Cryptospiza shelleyi Sharpe, 1902

= Shelley's crimsonwing =

Species of bird

Shelley's crimsonwing (Cryptospiza shelleyi) is a vulnerable species of estrildid finch native to the Albertine Rift montane forests. It has shown population decline over the past few decades, with a current population estimate of 1,000–2,499. This is possibly related to uncontrolled deforestation.

== Identification ==
It is a brightly coloured finch found at low levels. It is approximately 13 centimetres (5.1 in) long. The male Shelley's crimson-wing has bright red crown, face and back, with contrasting black wings and tail, as well as olive-yellow underparts with warmer tones on flanks and belly. The female is drabber with an olive head and some red on the mantle and rump. Both sexes have bright red bills.

Its voice is sharp and high-pitched with tit tit tit call. Rising and falling series of high-pitched tu tutu ti ti ti.

== Habitat ==
Shelley's crimsonwing inhabits the closed-canopy moist forest, often in lush valley bottoms near water, as well as low secondary growth at forest edges, forest clearings and glades dominated by large herbs, bamboo thickets and the upper forest/moorland ecotone.

It is found throughout the Albertine Rift montane forests, including the Itombwe Mountain, Kahuzi-Biéga National Park and mountains at the west of Lake Kivu in Democratic Republic of Congo, Nyungwe Forest, Gishwati, Makwa and Mukura Forest in Rwanda, Bururi Forest and elsewhere in Burundi, the Rwenzori Mountains and Bwindi Impenetrable Forest in Uganda, as well as the Virunga Mountain. It is generally rare, only being common in a few threatened forests, which shows unexplained fluctuations in abundance.

== Conservation measures ==
The IUCN has proposed that researchers investigate declines and fluctuations in Shelley's crimsonwing population, in order to assess threats of extinction. This includes surveying the extent of its habitat. The species is currently being researched in low density areas and of recent there was a very clear sighting of this bird in Ruhijja still part of Bwindi Impenetrable Forest as it was seen feeding from the ground for more than 3 minutes before it flew off, including the Virunga National Park in the Democratic Republic of Congo, Nyungwe Forest Reserve in Rwanda, and Rwenzori Mountains National Park and Bwindi Impenetrable National Park in Uganda.
