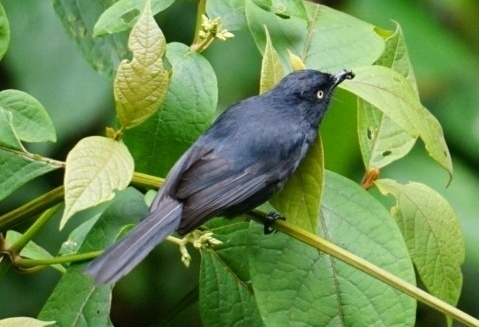

Conservation status
- Least Concern (IUCN 3.1)

Scientific classification
- Kingdom: Animalia
- Phylum: Chordata
- Class: Aves
- Order: Passeriformes
- Family: Muscicapidae
- Genus: Melaenornis
- Species: M. ardesiacus

Binomial name
- Melaenornis ardesiacus Berlioz, 1936
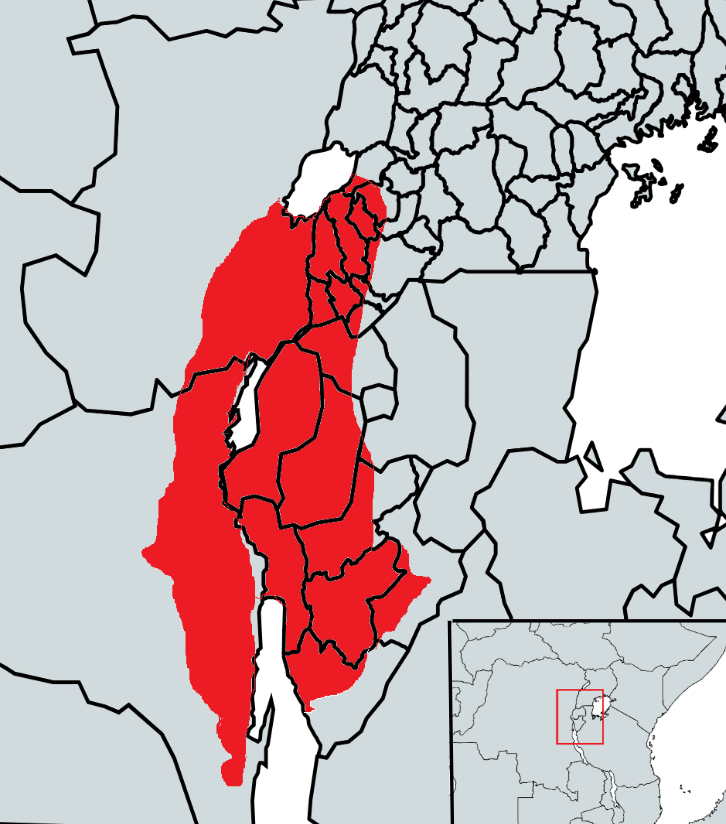

= Yellow-eyed black flycatcher =

Species of bird

The yellow-eyed black flycatcher (Melaenornis ardesiacus) is a small passerine bird of the genus Melaenornis in the flycatcher family Muscicapidae native to the Albertine Rift montane forests.

== Description ==
The chin, lores and forehead are blackish, the rest of the plumage is a deep blue-grey. It differs from the Northern black flycatcher and Southern black flycatcher by having pale eyes. The sexes are similar.

The juvenile has whitish spots on the breast. The immature is not properly described.

== Distribution and habitat ==
This species is found in the African Rift Valley from southern Uganda to northern Tanzania. It is generally found at an altitude of 1300-2450 metres. They occupy edges of forests and forest clearings.

== Diet ==
This species mainly eats caterpillars of butterflies and moths and beetles.

== Call ==
Calls have been recorded as raap, raap and a harsh tch-tchec.

== Breeding ==
This species breeds from January to April in the Democratic Republic of the Congo. It is monogamous and territorial. It builds a cup-shaped nest made of moss and small fibers, placed on the forks of tree branches about 4-5 meters in height.

The clutch size of this species is 2. No information is known on this species' incubation and nestling periods.
