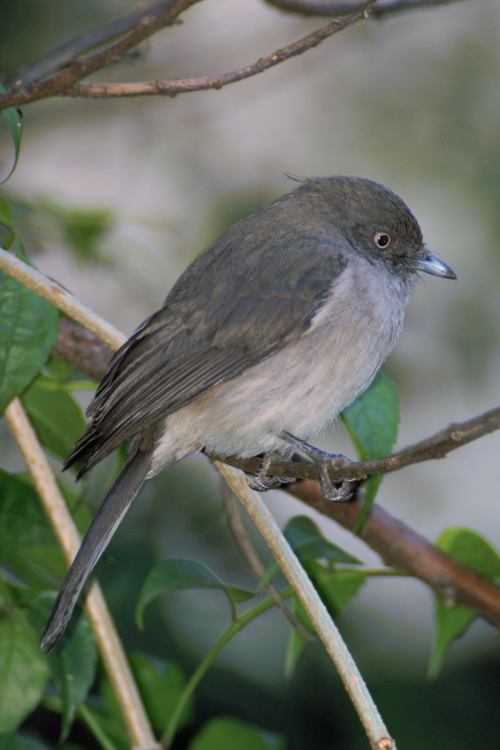
- Photo taken in Addis Ababa

Conservation status
- Least Concern (IUCN 3.1)

Scientific classification
- Kingdom: Animalia
- Phylum: Chordata
- Class: Aves
- Order: Passeriformes
- Family: Muscicapidae
- Genus: Melaenornis
- Species: M. chocolatinus

Binomial name
- Melaenornis chocolatinus (Rüppell, 1840)

Synonyms
- Muscicapa chocolatinus (Rüppell, 1840); Dioptrornis chocolatinus Rüppell, 1840

= Abyssinian slaty flycatcher =

Species of bird

The Abyssinian slaty flycatcher (Melaenornis chocolatinus), also known as Abyssinian flycatcher, Abyssinian black flycatcher or Abyssinian chocolate flycatcher, is a species of bird in the family Muscicapidae, the Old World flycatchers. It is often placed in the genus Dioptrornis. It is native to Africa, where it occurs in Eritrea and Ethiopia.

== Description ==
The Abyssinian slaty flycatcher is a rather dingy, undistinguished grey brown bird which normally perches with the typical vertical posture of an Old World flycatcher. It has a yellow eye set in a plain brownish face, the upperparts are dark sooty brown and the underparts are buff brown. It measures 15–16 cm (5.9–6.3 in) in length and weights 20–25 g (0.71–0.88 oz).

=== Voice ===
It makes various "tseep" calls and has a harsh chiiering alarm call.

== Distribution and subspecies ==
There are two currently recognised subspecies of Abyssinian slaty flycatcher and they are listed below with their distributions:

- Melaenornis chocolatinus chocolatinus (Rüppell, 1840): central Eritrea and north and central Ethiopia.
- Melaenornis chocolatinus reichenowi (Neumann, 1902): western Ethiopia.

== Habitat ==
The Abyssinian slaty flycatcher occurs in mid to high altitude forest, woodland edges, clearings, in agricultural land and in suburbs, where it can be found in large gardens and parks.

== Habits ==
The Abyssinian slaty flycatcher hunts in a typical flycatcher manner, sallying from a perch to catch insects in flight. It is suspected to breed in January to February and March to June in Ethiopia with enlarged gonads recorded from specimens taken in June, December and March to May. The nest is cup shaped and is placed at a narrow fork of a horizontal tree branch, the clutch consists of 3 blue-grey, blotched eggs.

== Taxonomy ==
The Abyssinian slaty flycatcher forms a superspecies with the Angola slaty flycatcher and the white-eyed slaty flycatcher, and these three species are sometime placed in the genus Dioptrornis, or lumped as a single species, but the allopatry and morphological differences shown support their treatment as allospecies. The results of a molecular phylogenetic study published in 2010 led to a reorganization of the Old World flycatchers family where the four species in Bradornis and the single species in Sigelus together with the Dioprornis species were merged into Melaenornis.
