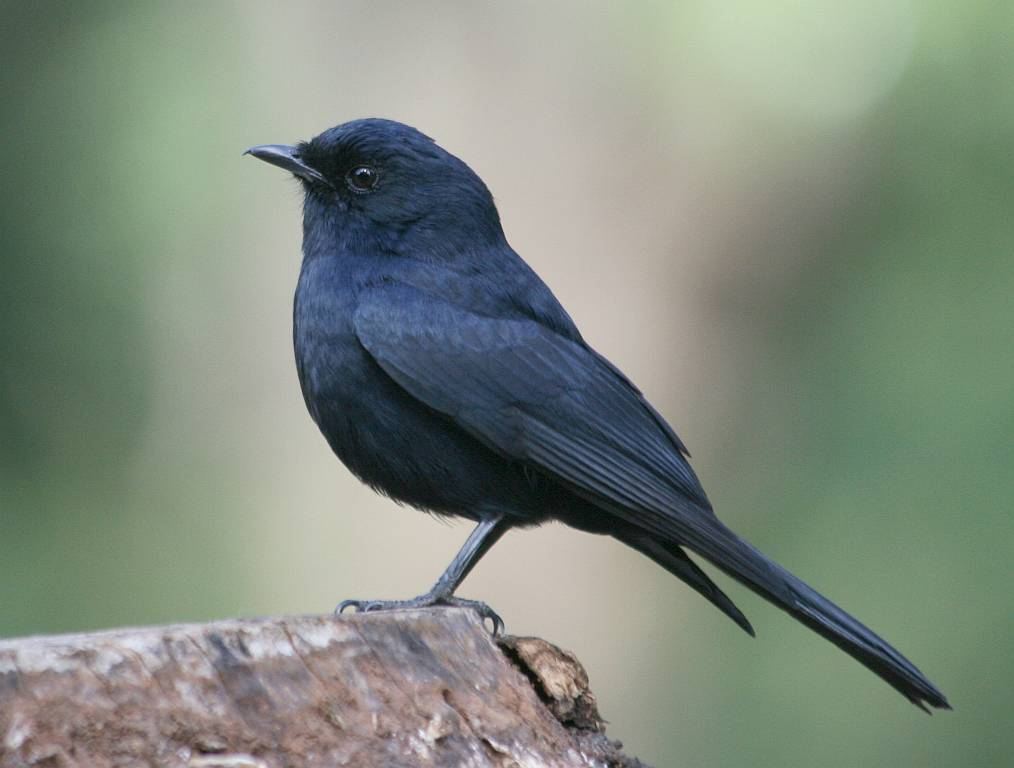
- Southern black flycatcher (Melaenornis pammelaina)

Scientific classification
- Kingdom: Animalia
- Phylum: Chordata
- Class: Aves
- Order: Passeriformes
- Family: Muscicapidae
- Tribe: Muscicapini
- Genus: Melaenornis; G.R. Gray, 1840

Type species
- Melasoma edolioides Swainson, 1937

Species
- see text

= Melaenornis =

Genus of birds

Melaenornis is a genus of small passerine birds in the large family Muscicapidae commonly known as the Old World flycatchers. They are restricted to sub-Saharan Africa.

== Taxonomy ==
The genus Melaenornis was introduced in 1840 by the English zoologist George Gray. It was a replacement name for Melasoma that had been introduced in 1837 by William Swainson with the northern black flycatcher as the type species. Melasoma was pre-occupied by "Melasoma Dillwyn" that had been introduced in 1831 by James Stephens for a genus of insects. The name Melaenornis combines the Ancient Greek melas, melaina meaning "black" with ornis meaning "bird".

== Species ==
The genus contains the following seven species:

Image	Common name	Scientific name	Distribution
	Angola slaty flycatcher	Melaenornis brunneus	Angola
	White-eyed slaty flycatcher	Melaenornis fischeri	eastern Afromontane
	Abyssinian slaty flycatcher	Melaenornis chocolatinus	Ethiopian Highlands
	Nimba flycatcher	Melaenornis annamarulae	Western Guinean lowland forests
	Yellow-eyed black flycatcher	Melaenornis ardesiacus	Albertine Rift montane forests
	Northern black flycatcher	Melaenornis edolioides	northern Sub-Saharan Africa
	Southern black flycatcher	Melaenornis pammelaina	southern Sub-Saharan Africa

This genus formerly included fewer species. The results of a molecular phylogenetic study published in 2010 led to a reorganization of the Old World flycatchers family in which the four species in Bradornis and the single species in Sigelus were merged into Melaenornis. The genus formerly included the pale flycatcher and the chat flycatcher. Based on a phylogenetic study published in 2023, they were moved to the resurrected genus Agricola.
