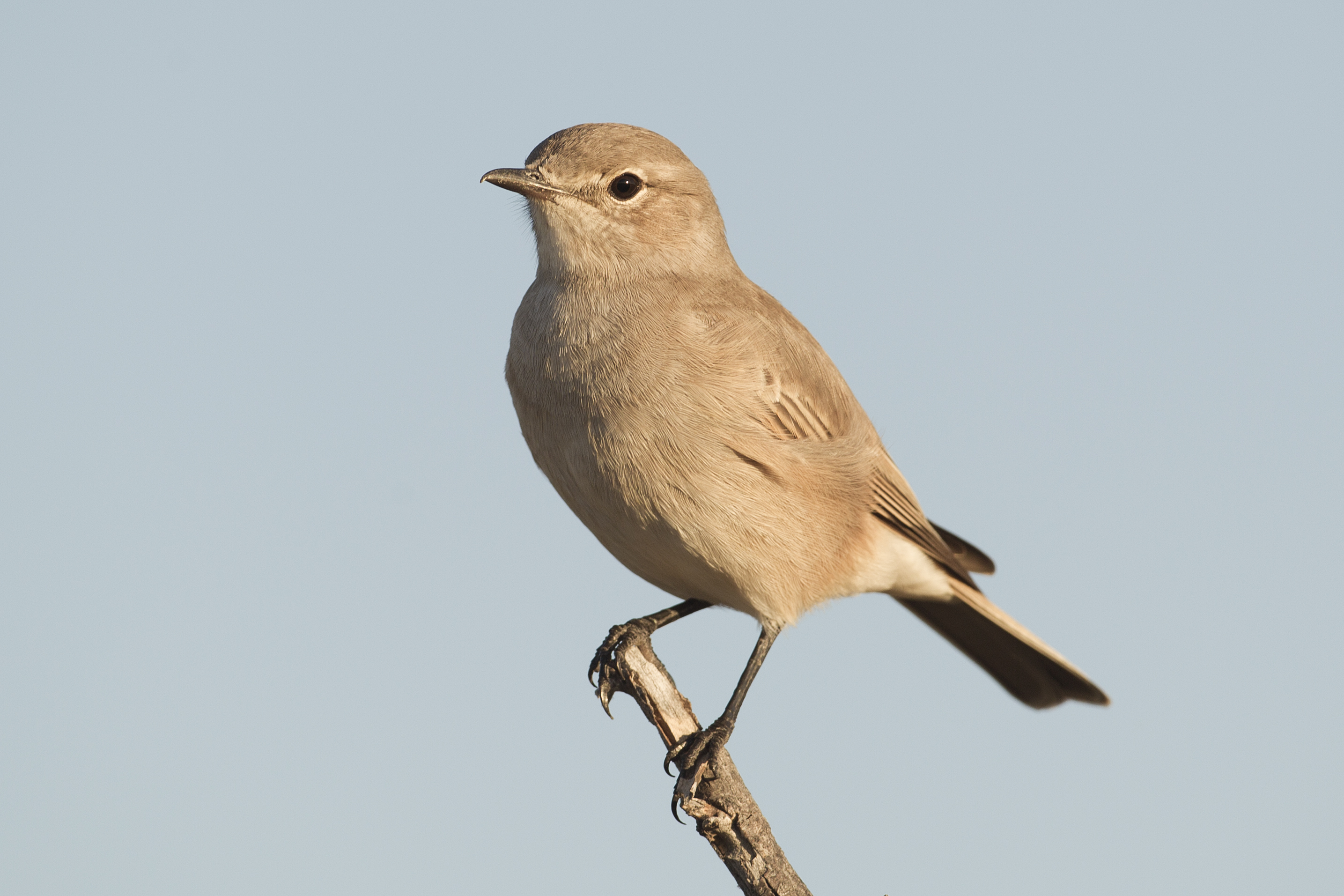
- Chat flycatcher (Agricola infuscatus)

Scientific classification
- Kingdom: Animalia
- Phylum: Chordata
- Class: Aves
- Order: Passeriformes
- Family: Muscicapidae
- Genus: Agricola; Bonaparte, 1854

Type species
- Saxicola infuscata Smith, A, 1839

= Agricola (bird) =

Genus of birds

Agricola is a genus of small passerine birds in the large family Muscicapidae commonly known as the Old World flycatchers. They are restricted to sub-Saharan Africa.

== Taxonomy ==
A molecular phylogenetic study published in 2023 found that the genus Melaenornis was not monophyletic. In the resulting rearrangement, two species were moved from Melaenornis to the resurrected genus Agricola that had been introduced in 1854 by the French naturalist Charles Lucien Bonaparte to accommodate the chat flycatcher.

== Species ==
The Agricola genus contains the following two species:

Image	Common name	Scientific name
	Pale flycatcher	Agricola pallidus
	Chat flycatcher	Agricola infuscatus
