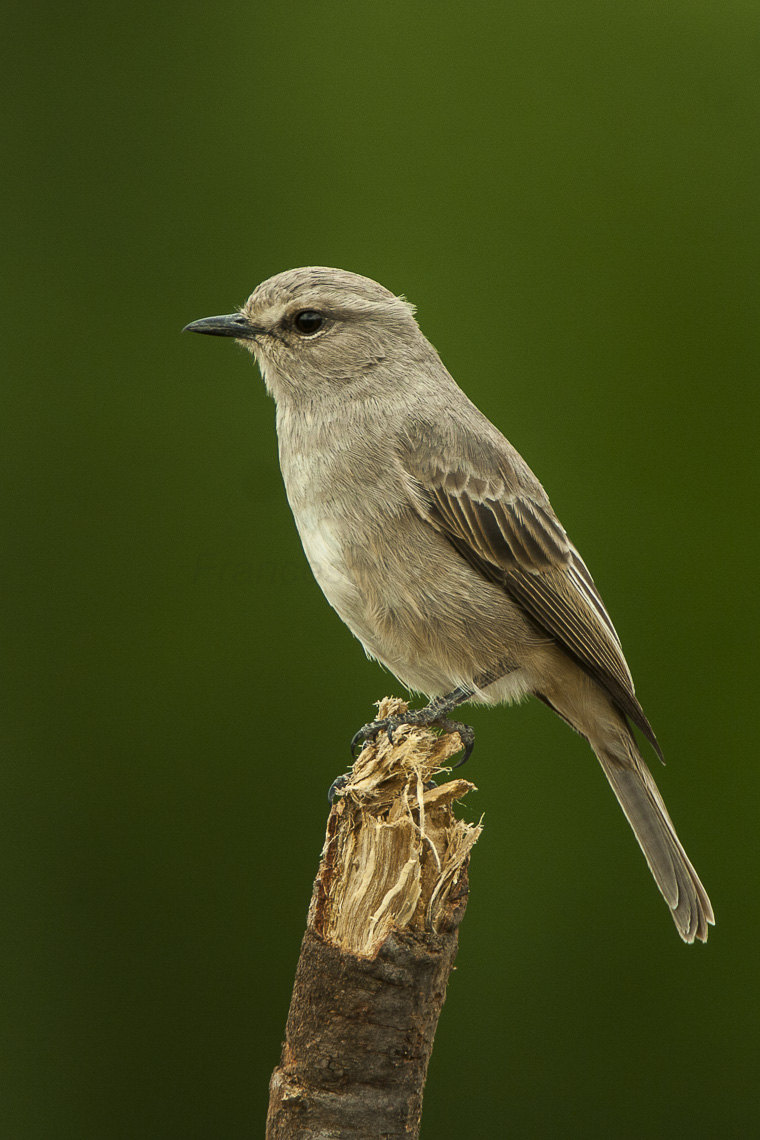
- in Kenya

Conservation status
- Least Concern (IUCN 3.1)

Scientific classification
- Kingdom: Animalia
- Phylum: Chordata
- Class: Aves
- Order: Passeriformes
- Family: Muscicapidae
- Genus: Agricola
- Species: A. pallidus

Binomial name
- Agricola pallidus (von Müller, 1851)

Synonyms
- Musicapa pallida (protonym); Melaenornis pallidus Bradornis pallidus

= Pale flycatcher =

Species of bird

The pale flycatcher (Agricola pallidus) is a passerine bird of the Old World flycatcher family Muscicapidae, native to Sub-Saharan Africa.

== Taxonomy ==
The pale flycatcher was previously placed in the genus Bradornis but was moved to Melaenornis based on the results of a molecular phylogenetic study published in 2010. It was subsequently moved to the genus Agricola based on a study published in 2023.

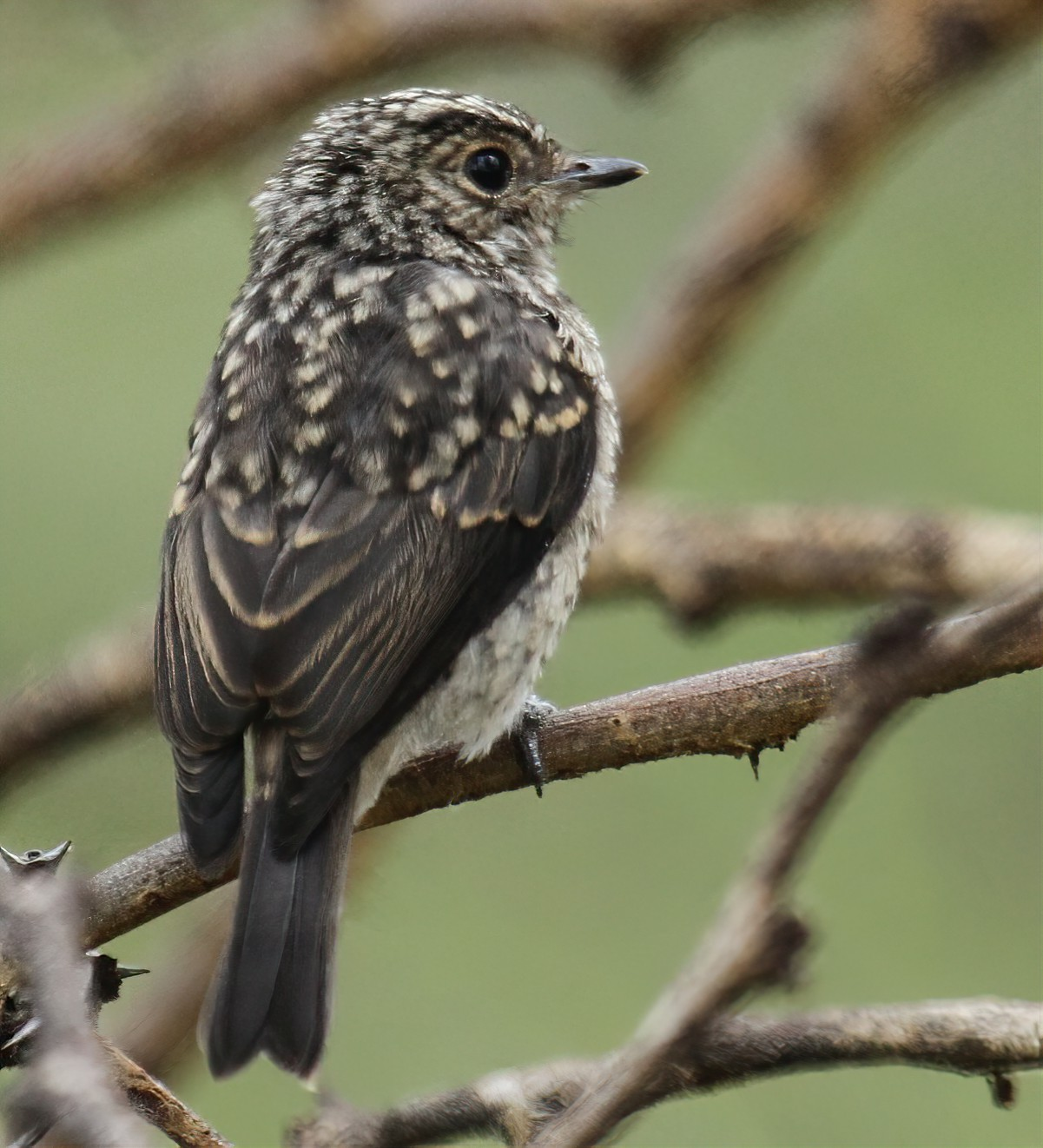
juvenile, Lake Navasha Country Club - Kenya

== Range ==
It is widely present across Sub-Saharan Africa, although absent in the Congo Basin and Southern Africa.

== Habitat ==
Its natural habitats are subtropical or tropical dry forests, dry savanna, and subtropical or tropical dry shrubland.
