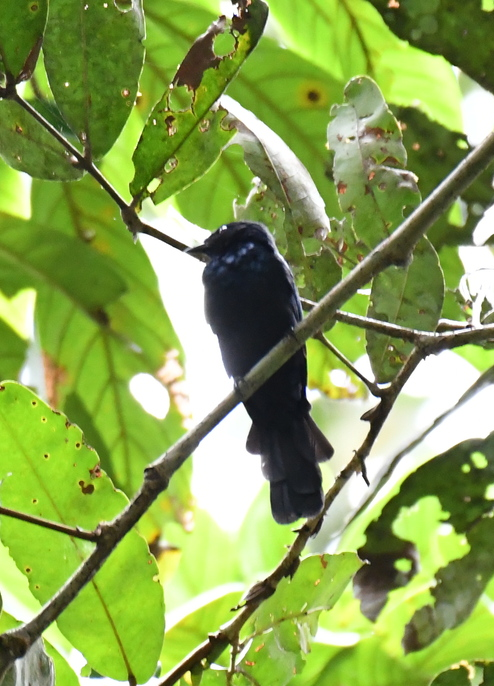

Conservation status
- Vulnerable (IUCN 3.1)

Scientific classification
- Kingdom: Animalia
- Phylum: Chordata
- Class: Aves
- Order: Passeriformes
- Family: Muscicapidae
- Genus: Melaenornis
- Species: M. annamarulae

Binomial name
- Melaenornis annamarulae Forbes-Watson, 1970

= Nimba flycatcher =

Species of bird

The Nimba flycatcher (Melaenornis annamarulae) is a small passerine bird of the genus Melaenornis in the flycatcher family Muscicapidae. It is native to the West African countries of Côte d'Ivoire, Ghana, Guinea, Liberia and Sierra Leone.
