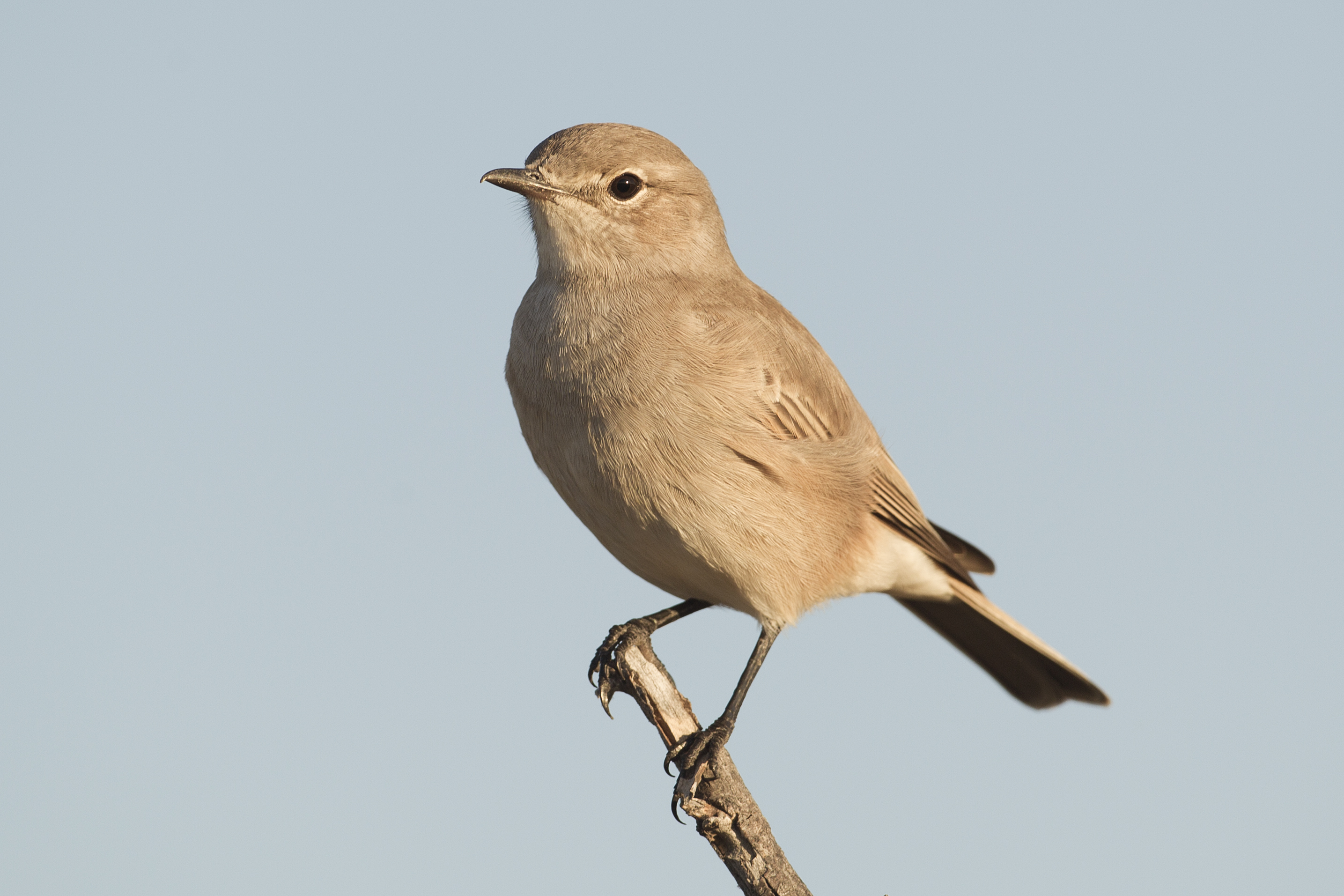
- In Etosha National Park

Conservation status
- Least Concern (IUCN 3.1)

Scientific classification
- Kingdom: Animalia
- Phylum: Chordata
- Class: Aves
- Order: Passeriformes
- Family: Muscicapidae
- Genus: Agricola
- Species: A. infuscatus

Binomial name
- Agricola infuscatus (Smith, A, 1839)

Synonyms
- Bradornis infuscatus Melaenornis infuscatus Saxicola infuscata

= Chat flycatcher =

Species of bird

The chat flycatcher (Agricola infuscatus) is a small passerine bird in the Old World flycatcher family Muscicapidae that is native to southern Africa.

== Taxonomy ==
The chat flycatcher was previously placed in the genus Bradornis but was moved to Melaenornis based on the results of a molecular phylogenetic study published in 2010. It was subsequently moved to the genus Agricola based on a study published in 2023.

== Description ==
The chat flycatcher is an earthy light reddish-brown in colour and has large, pale wing edges. Juvenile flycatchers have speckled feathers. The flycatcher produces a song that consists of a "cher cher chirrup" sound. The bird is about twenty centimeters long.

== Habitat ==
The chat flycatcher is found in South Africa, Botswana and Angola. The flycatcher frequently perches on low-lying bushes and telephone wires. Its natural habitat is dry savanna. However, it is also found in shrublands and woodlands throughout its range.

== Behavior ==
=== Diet ===
The chat flycatcher hunts insects. Specifically, it consumes termites, ants and beetles. The flycatcher also consumes small reptiles such as Typhlops, a genus of blind snakes.

=== Reproduction ===
The chat flycatcher lays eggs year round. However, egg laying is believed to peak from September to March, a period of increased rainfall in the habitat of the flycatcher. The flycatcher lays an average of two to three eggs. The chat flycatcher nests above ground in shrubs and thickets. The mother incubates the eggs for approximately two weeks, while the father is responsible for ensuring that the female is fed. After the eggs hatch, the hatchlings are raised and fed by their parents. They tend to leave the nest anywhere from eleven to fourteen days after hatching.

== Conservation status ==
The chat flycatcher is categorized as least concern by the International Union for Conservation of Nature. The reasoning for this ranking includes the flycatcher's large range and relatively stable population trends.
