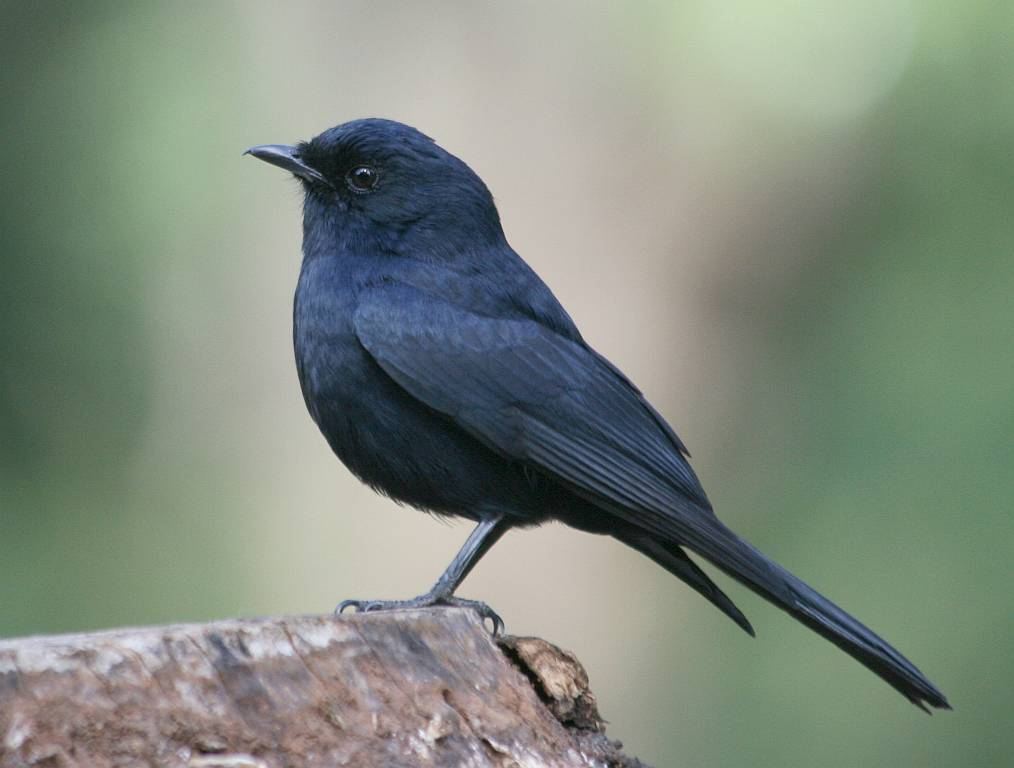

Conservation status
- Least Concern (IUCN 3.1)

Scientific classification
- Kingdom: Animalia
- Phylum: Chordata
- Class: Aves
- Order: Passeriformes
- Family: Muscicapidae
- Genus: Melaenornis
- Species: M. pammelaina

Binomial name
- Melaenornis pammelaina (Stanley, 1814)

= Southern black flycatcher =

Species of bird

The southern black flycatcher (Melaenornis pammelaina) is a small passerine bird of the genus Melaenornis in the flycatcher family, Muscicapidae, native to open and lightly wooded areas of eastern and southern Africa.

This species has a large range, with an estimated global extent of occurrence of 4,000,000 square kilometres (1,500,000 sq mi). The global population size has not been quantified but the bird is listed by the IUCN as being of "Least concern".

== Description ==
The southern black flycatcher is entirely black, with a black beak and black legs. The iris of the eye is brown and this, along with the square-cut tail, helps distinguish it from the otherwise similar fork-tailed drongo (Dicrurus adsimilis) which has a red iris and long forked tail.

== Distribution and habitat ==
The southern black flycatcher is native to eastern and southern Africa. It has been recorded from Somalia, Kenya, Uganda, Tanzania, Rwanda, Burundi, Congo, the Democratic Republic of the Congo, Angola, Namibia, Eswatini, Botswana, Malawi, Mozambique, Zambia, Zimbabwe, Lesotho and South Africa. It is typically found in habitats with open areas and light woodland, riparian corridors, the edges of plantations and in gardens. The trees in these habitats include miombo (Brachystegia spp.), thorntrees (Acacia spp.) and mopane (Colosphermum mopane).

== Behaviour ==
The southern black flycatcher is a mainly insectivorous bird. Its diet includes beetles, termites, locusts, worms, spiders and centipedes. Its main foraging technique is to perch on a low eminence such as a branch or fence post and pounce on prey in the air or on the ground below. It is also known to sip nectar from the flowers of mountain aloe (Aloe marlothii) and to eat the berries of the black nightshade (Solanum nigrum). It sometimes forages in small flocks, often associating with fork-tailed drongos. Possible benefits for this association is a lower predation risk and a higher foraging success.

Breeding takes place between May and January, peaking in September and October. The nest is usually built in a recess in a tree trunk or behind a loose slab of bark, but is sometimes in a tangle of creepers, the sheath of a palm frond, banana bunch or an abandoned farm implement. It is cup-shaped and composed of twigs and dry grasses, lined with fine rootlets. Up to four eggs are laid and incubation lasts about two weeks with the young fledging and leaving the nest in fifteen to twenty days.

== Status ==
The IUCN list the southern black flycatcher as being of "Least concern". This is because it has a wide range, approximately 4,000,000 square kilometres (1,500,000 sq mi), the population seems stable and the bird is said to be common over at least part of its range.
