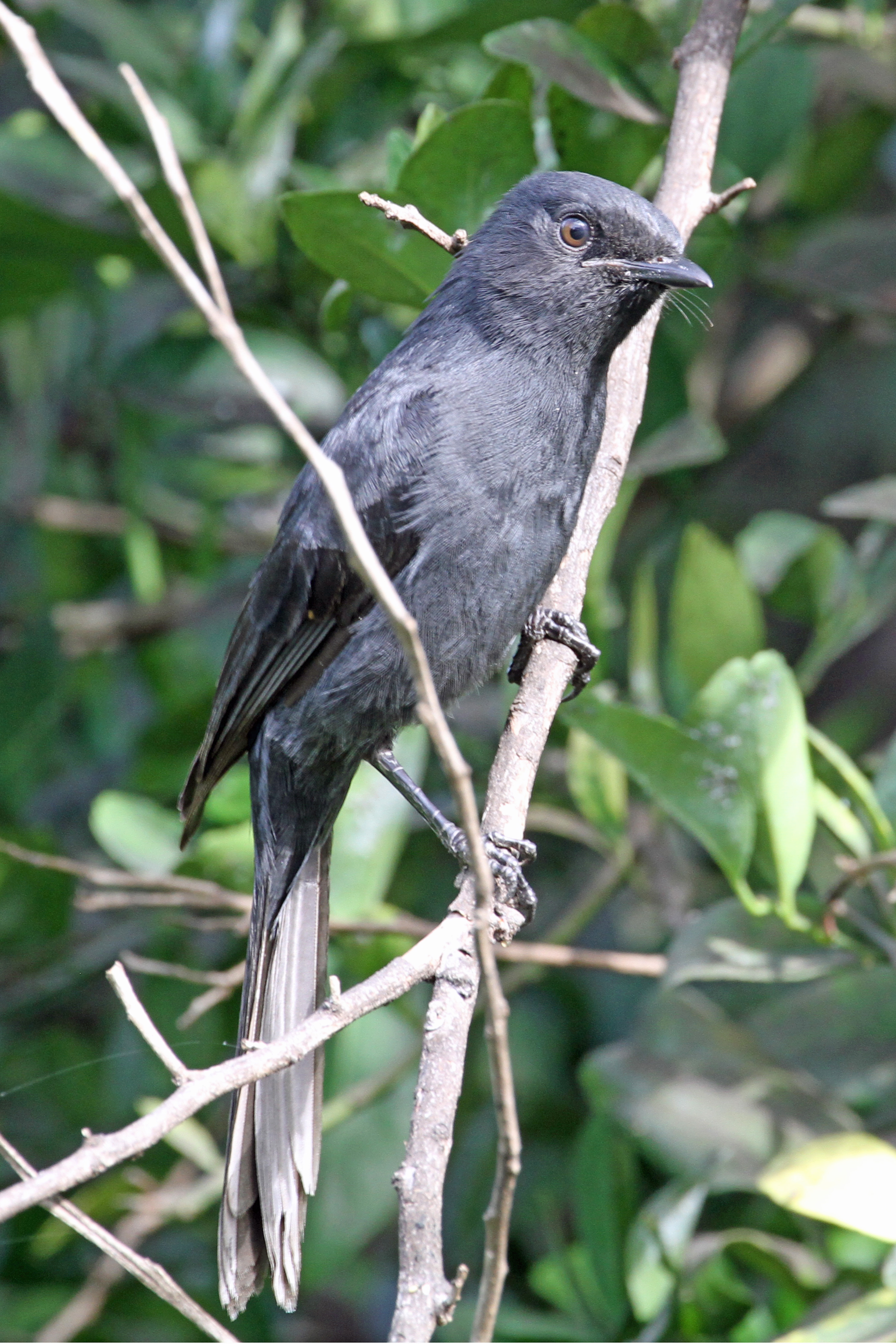
- M. e. elioides Banjul, Gambia

Conservation status
- Least Concern (IUCN 3.1)

Scientific classification
- Kingdom: Animalia
- Phylum: Chordata
- Class: Aves
- Order: Passeriformes
- Family: Muscicapidae
- Genus: Melaenornis
- Species: M. edolioides

Binomial name
- Melaenornis edolioides (Swainson, 1837)

= Northern black flycatcher =

Species of bird

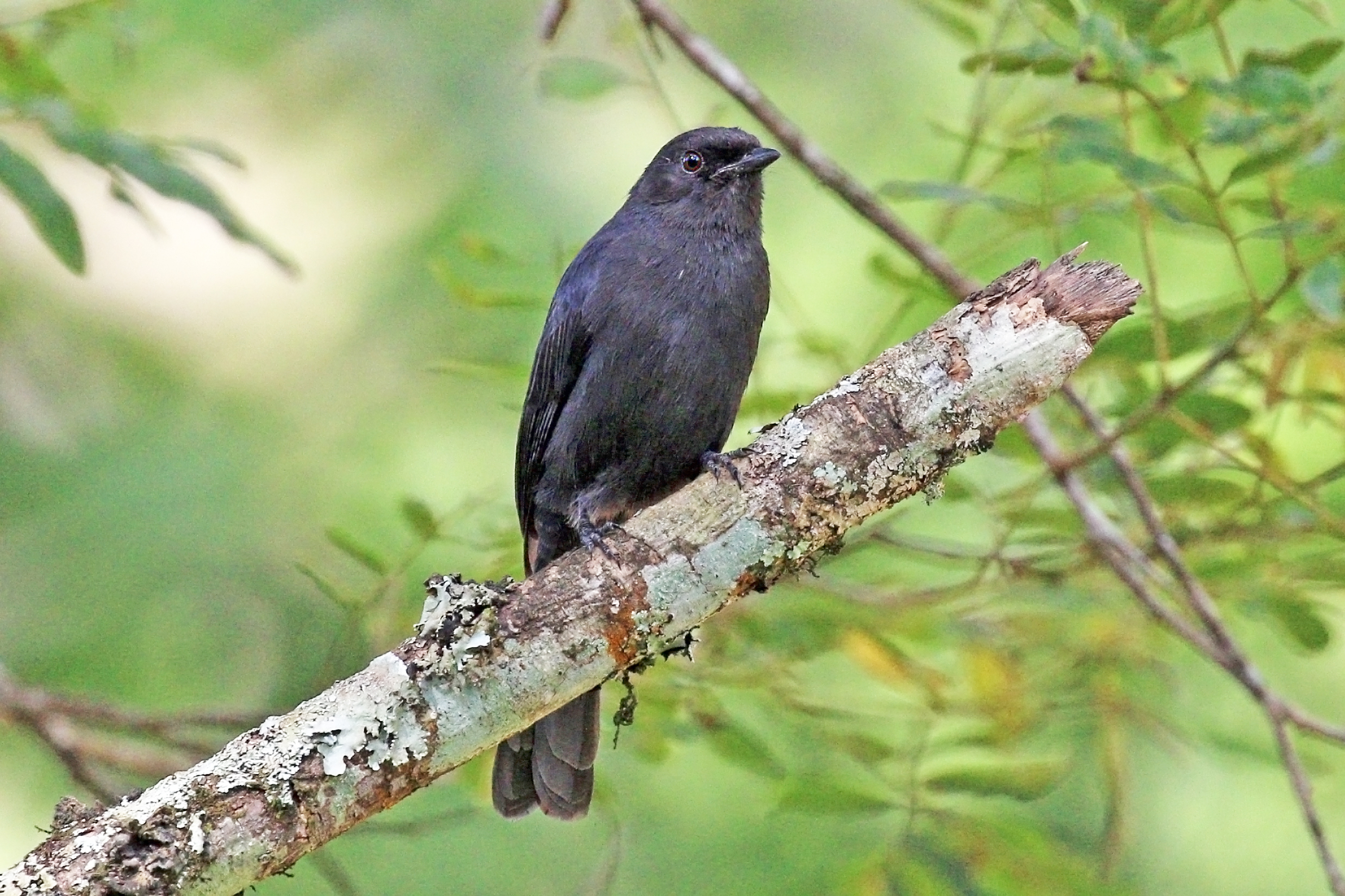
M. e. lugubris Kakamega Forest, Kenya

The northern black flycatcher (Melaenornis edolioides) is a small passerine bird in the flycatcher family, Muscicapidae.

== Range ==
This is an insectivorous species which is a resident breeder in tropical Africa from Senegal to Ethiopia and south to Zaire and Tanzania.

== Habitat ==
The northern black flycatcher is found in moist wooded areas and cultivation. It nests in a hole or reuses the old nest of another species, and lays two or three eggs. Breeding takes place in the wet season.

== Description ==
The northern black flycatcher is 20 centimetres (7.9 in) long. It is a large upright long-tailed flycatcher. The adult is uniformly black. Juveniles are blackish-brown with buff scaling.

The long square-ended tail helps to distinguish this species from two other all-black insectivores, the fork-tailed drongo and the shorter-tailed and red-eyed common square-tailed drongo.

== Song ==
This flycatcher has a simple musical song and a thin tsee-whee call.
