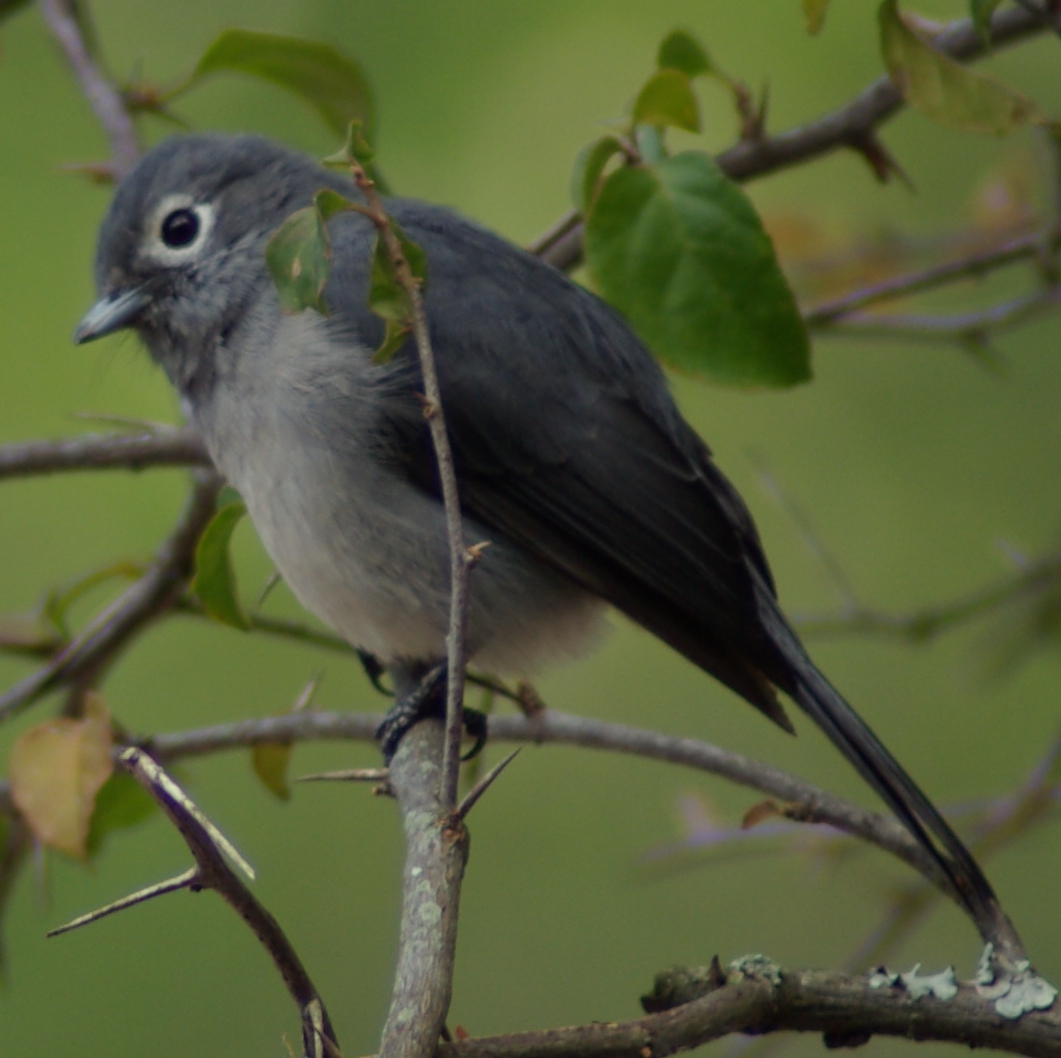
- Adult M. f. fischeri

Conservation status
- Least Concern (IUCN 3.1)

Scientific classification
- Kingdom: Animalia
- Phylum: Chordata
- Class: Aves
- Order: Passeriformes
- Family: Muscicapidae
- Genus: Melaenornis
- Species: M. fischeri

Binomial name
- Melaenornis fischeri (Reichenow, 1884)

Synonyms
- Dioptrornis fischeri

= White-eyed slaty flycatcher =

Species of bird

The white-eyed slaty flycatcher (Melaenornis fischeri) is a small passerine bird of the genus Melaenornis in the Old World flycatcher family Muscicapidae. It is native to the African highlands from Ethiopia and Kenya through Rwanda to eastern Zaire and Malawi. The sub-species M. f. toruensis occurs in Rwanda and Burundi and has an inconspicuous eye-ring.

The specific epithet commemorates the German explorer Gustav Adolf Fischer.

== Gallery ==
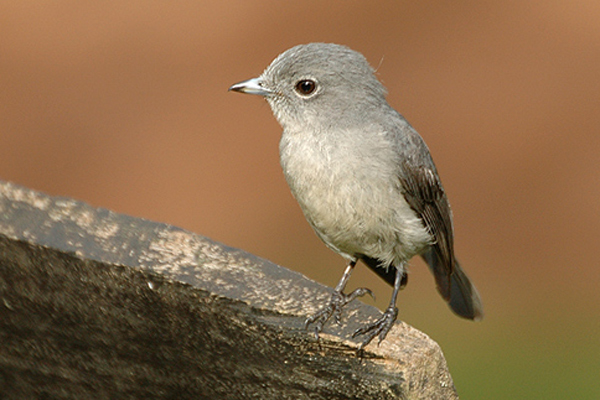
Bwindi NP, Uganda

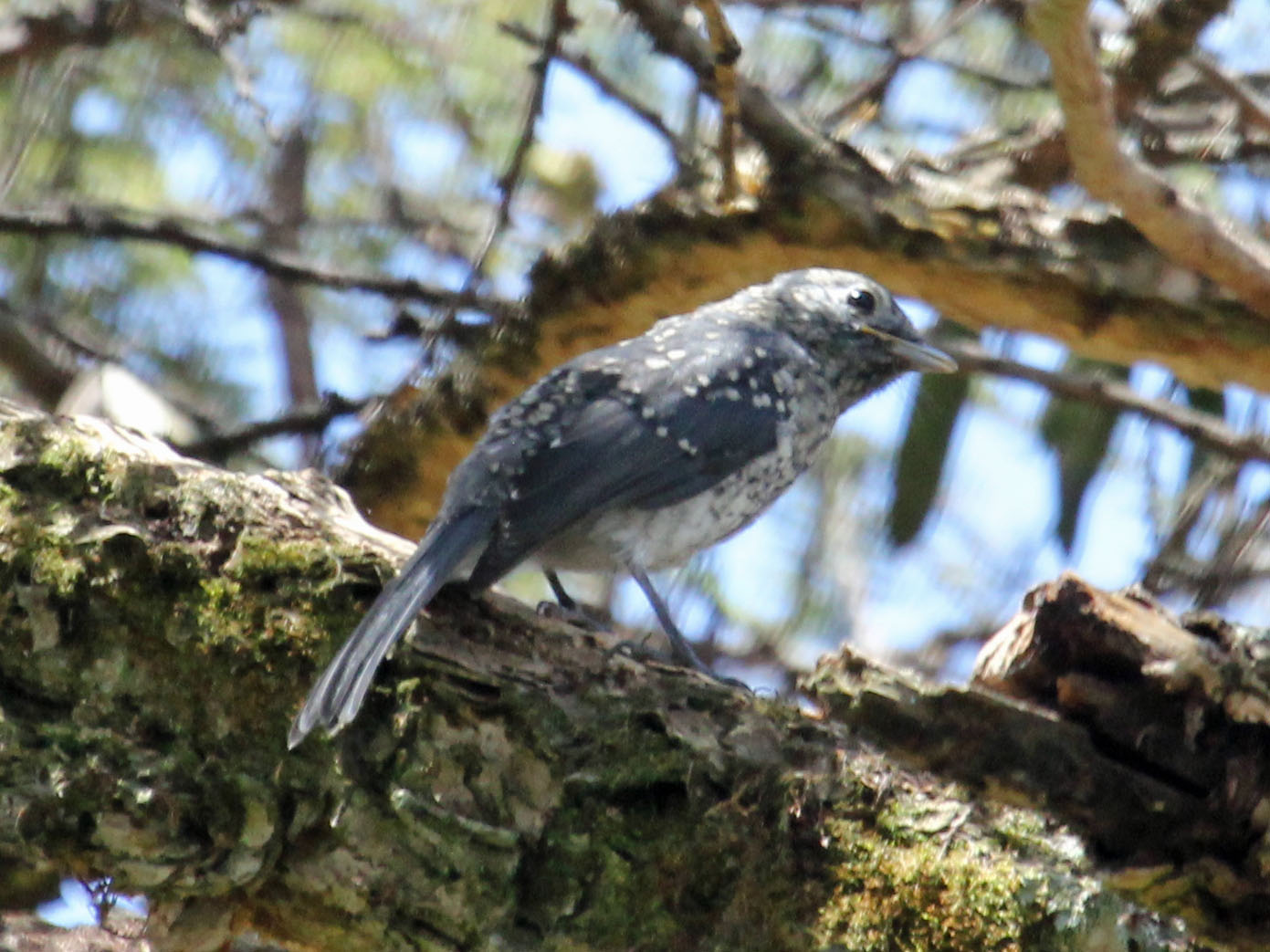
Juvenile in Kenya

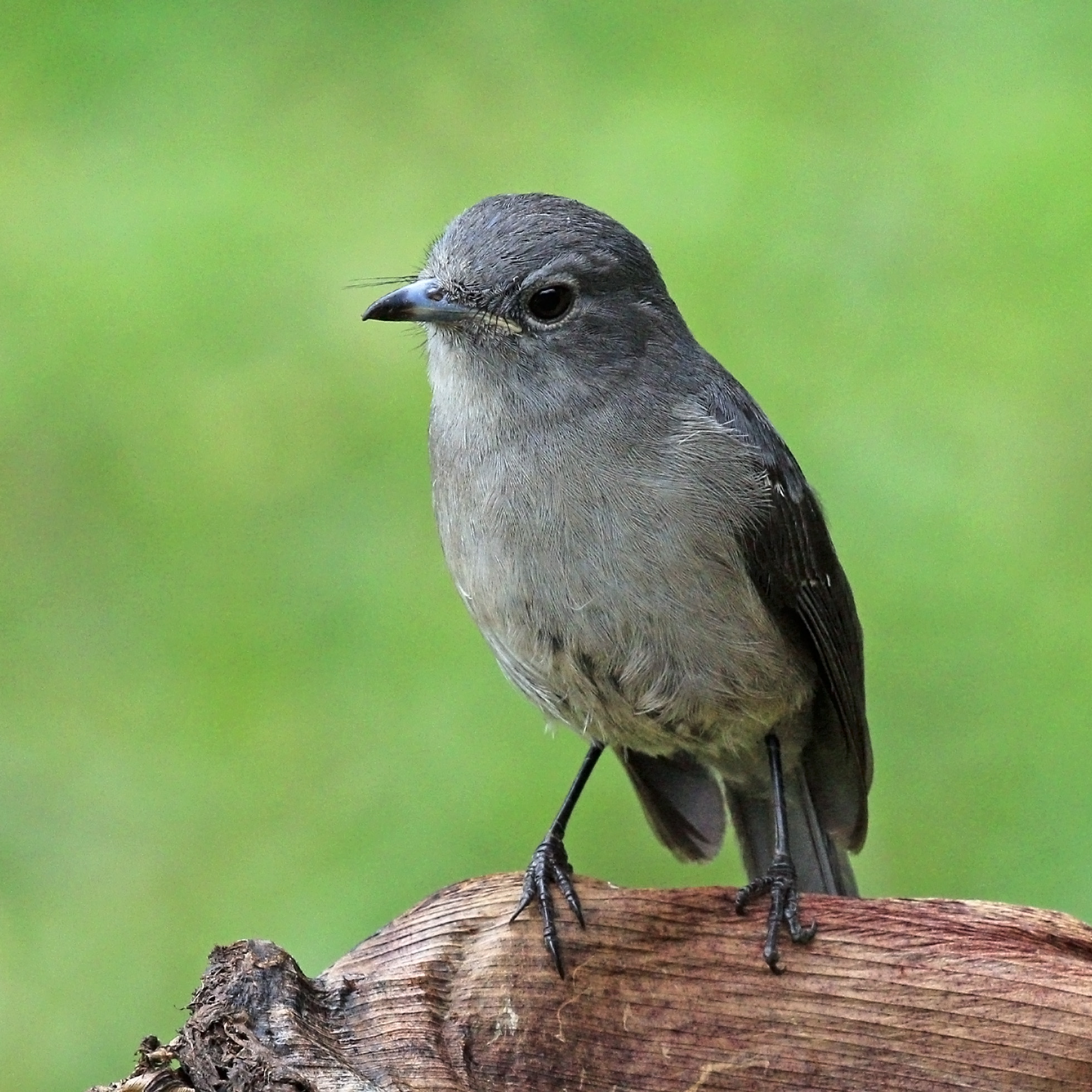
M. f. toruensis
Sabyinyo Silverback Lodge, Rwanda

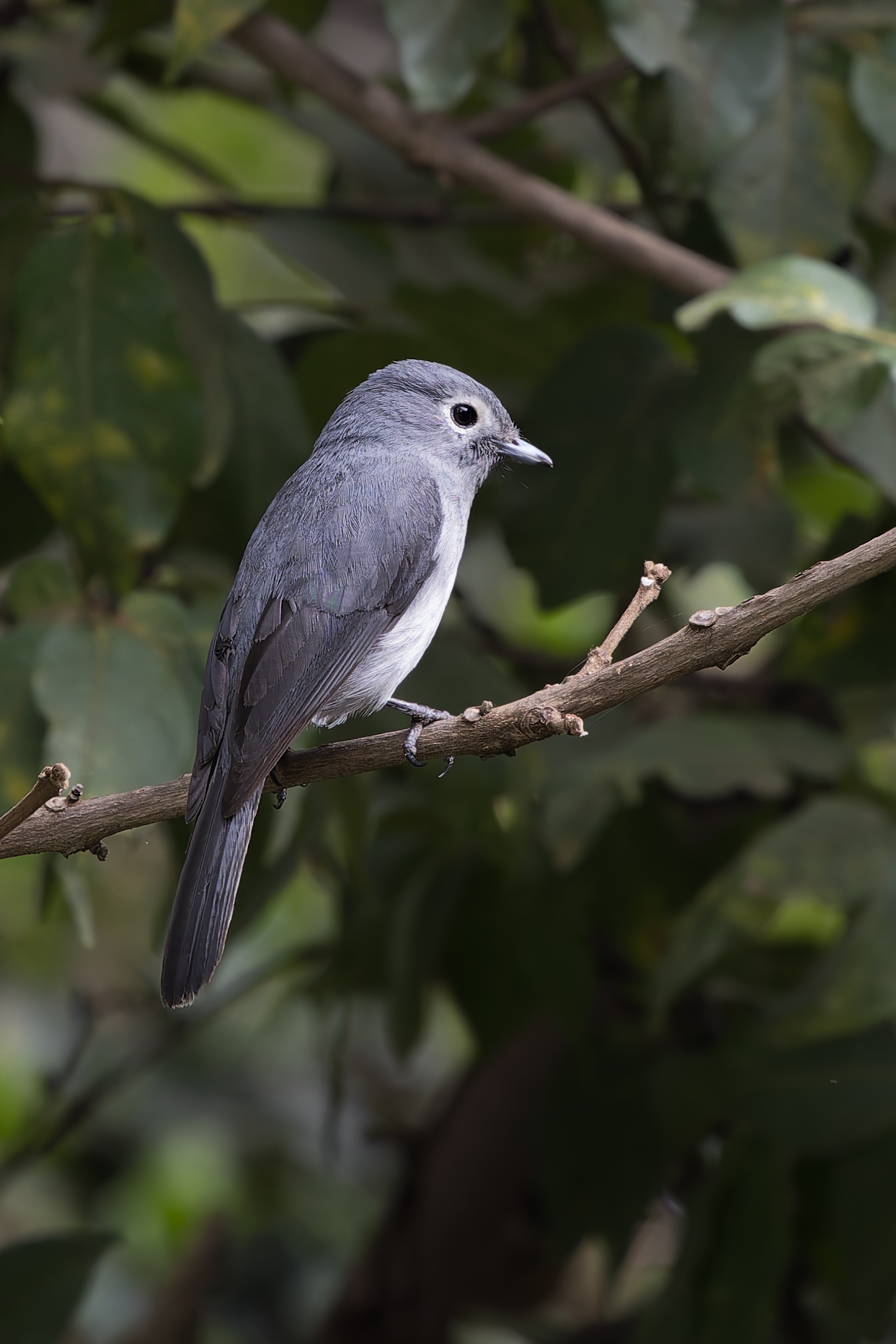
