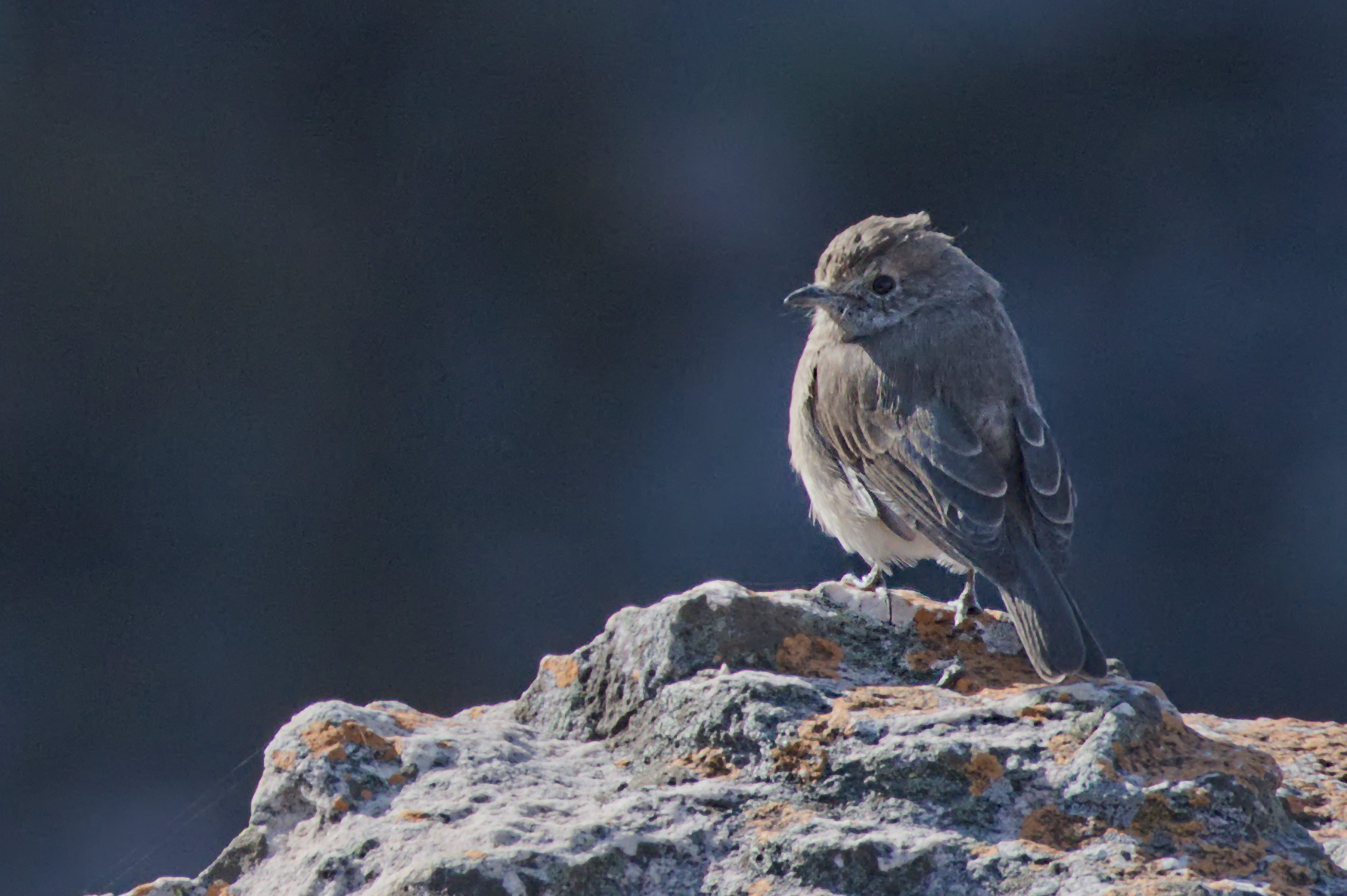

Conservation status
- Least Concern (IUCN 3.1)

Scientific classification
- Kingdom: Animalia
- Phylum: Chordata
- Class: Aves
- Order: Passeriformes
- Family: Muscicapidae
- Genus: Melaenornis
- Species: M. brunneus

Binomial name
- Melaenornis brunneus (Cabanis, 1886)

Synonyms
- Dioptrornis brunneus

= Angola slaty flycatcher =

Species of bird

The Angola slaty flycatcher (Melaenornis brunneus) is a small passerine bird in the flycatcher family Muscicapidae. It is sometimes placed in the genus Dioptrornis instead of Melaenornis. As suggested by its common name, it is endemic to Angola.
