= List of birds of Angola =

This is a list of the bird species recorded in Angola. The avifauna of Angola include a total of 1005 species, of which thirteen are endemic, and one has been introduced by humans.

This list's taxonomic treatment (designation and sequence of orders, families and species) and nomenclature (common and scientific names) follow the conventions of The Clements Checklist of Birds of the World, 2022 edition. The family accounts at the beginning of each heading reflect this taxonomy, as do the species counts found in each family account. Introduced and accidental species are included in the total counts for Angola.

The following tags have been used to highlight several categories. The commonly occurring native species do not fall into any of these categories.

- (A) Accidental - a species that rarely or accidentally occurs in Angola
- (E) Endemic - a species endemic to Angola
- (I) Introduced - a species introduced to Angola as a consequence, direct or indirect, of human actions

== Ostriches ==
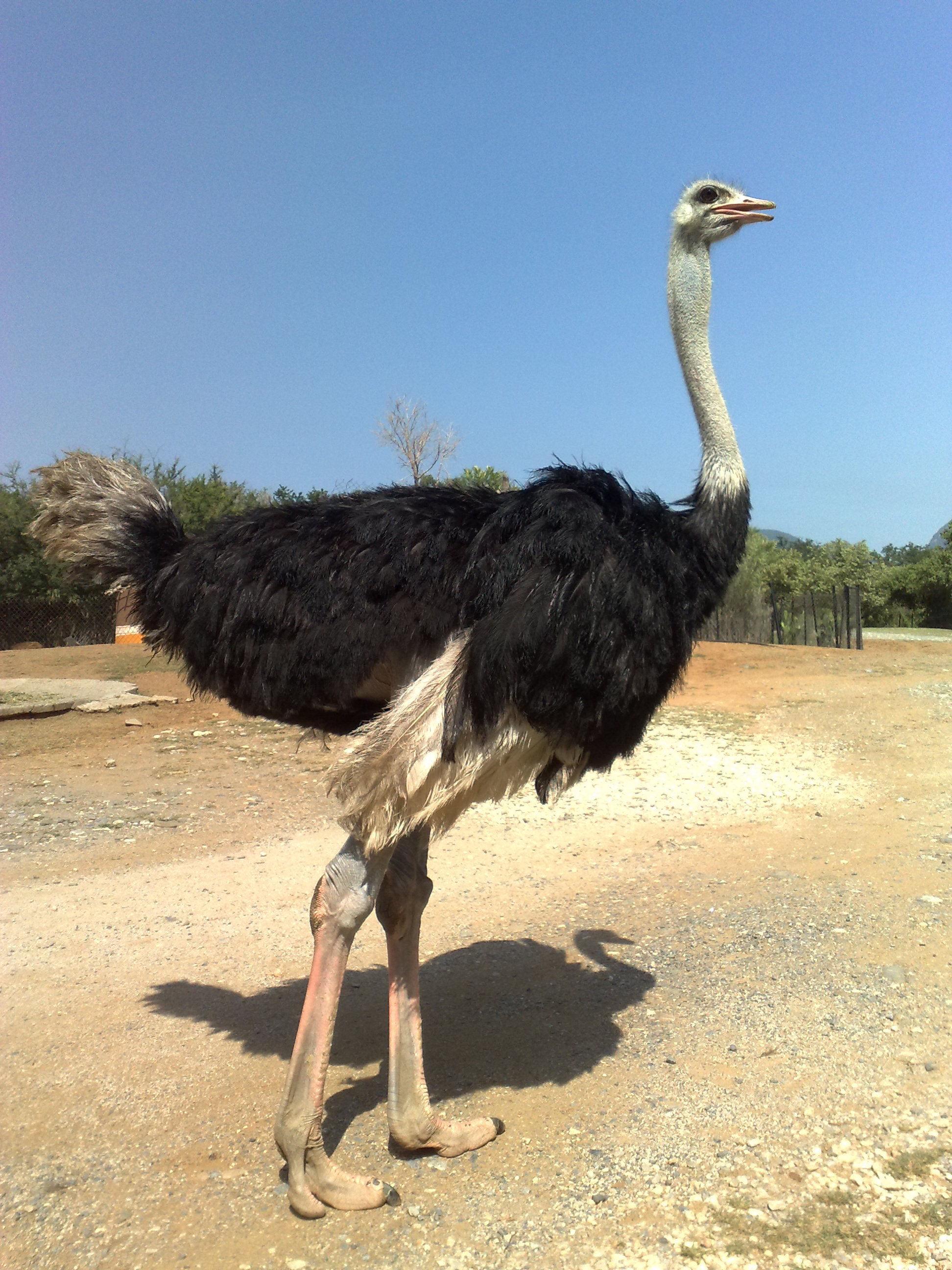
Common ostrich

Order: Struthioniformes Family: Struthionidae

The ostrich is a flightless bird native to Africa, and it is the largest living species of bird. It is distinctive in its appearance, with a long neck and legs and the ability to run at high speeds.

- Common ostrich, Struthio camelus

== Ducks, geese, and waterfowl ==
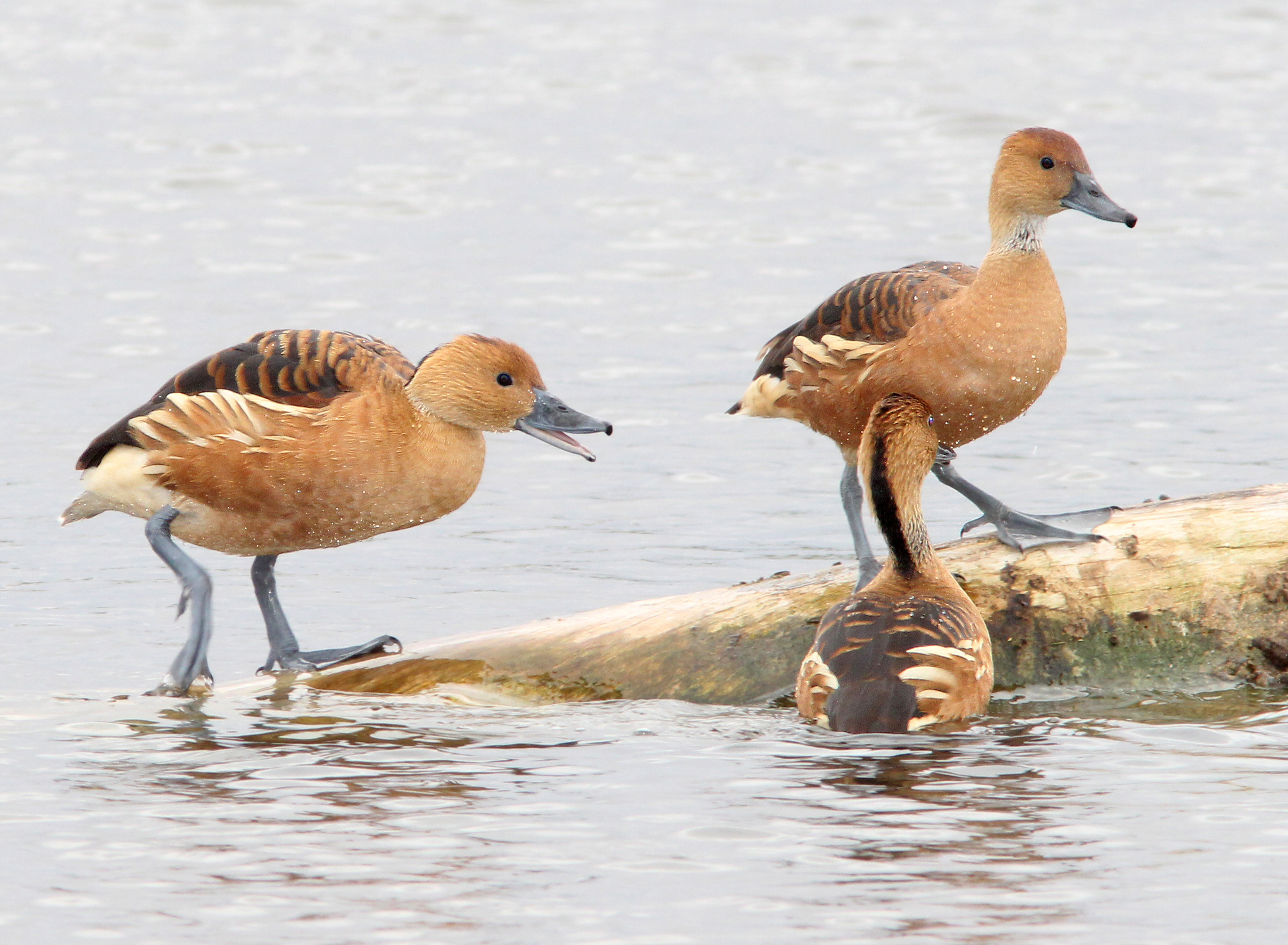
Fulvous whistling-duck

Order: Anseriformes Family: Anatidae

Anatidae includes the ducks and most duck-like waterfowl, such as geese and swans. These birds are adapted to an aquatic existence with webbed feet, flattened bills, and feathers that are excellent at shedding water due to an oily coating.

- White-faced whistling-duck, Dendrocygna viduata
- Fulvous whistling-duck, Dendrocygna bicolor
- White-backed duck, Thalassornis leuconotus
- Knob-billed duck, Sarkidiornis melanotos
- Hartlaub's duck, Pteronetta hartlaubii
- Egyptian goose, Alopochen aegyptiacus
- Spur-winged goose, Plectropterus gambensis
- African pygmy-goose, Nettapus auritus
- Blue-billed teal, Spatula hottentota
- Cape shoveler, Spatula smithii (A)
- Northern shoveler, Spatula clypeata
- African black duck, Anas sparsa
- Yellow-billed duck, Anas undulata
- Cape teal, Anas capensis
- Red-billed duck, Anas erythrorhyncha
- Southern pochard, Netta erythrophthalma
- Maccoa duck, Oxyura maccoa (A)

== Guineafowl ==
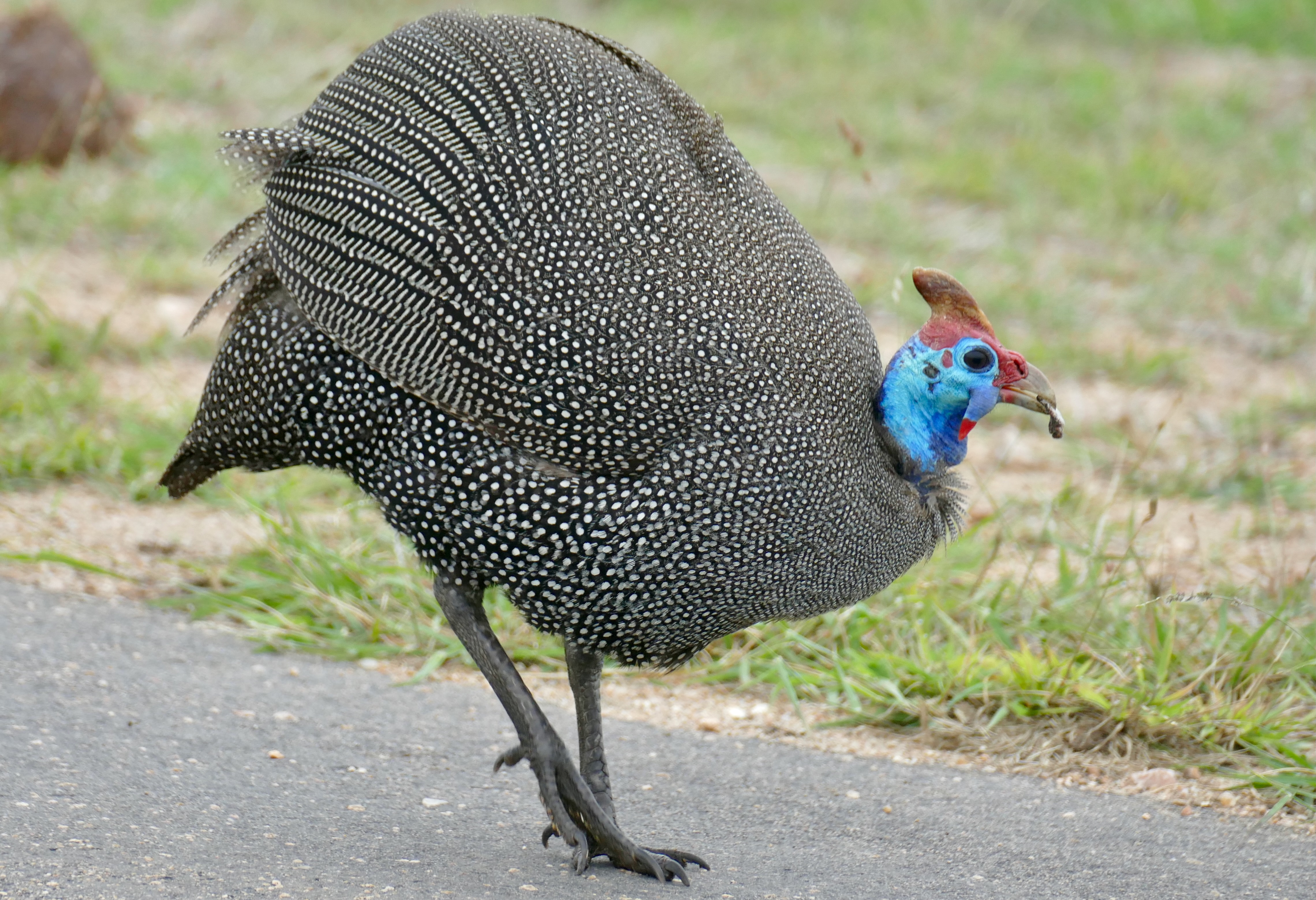
Helmeted guineafowl

Order: Galliformes Family: Numididae

Guineafowl are a group of African, seed-eating, ground-nesting birds that resemble partridges, but with featherless heads and spangled grey plumage.

- Helmeted guineafowl, Numida meleagris
- Black guineafowl, Agelastes niger
- Plumed guineafowl, Guttera plumifera
- Western crested guineafowl, Guttera verreauxi

== Pheasants, grouse, and allies ==
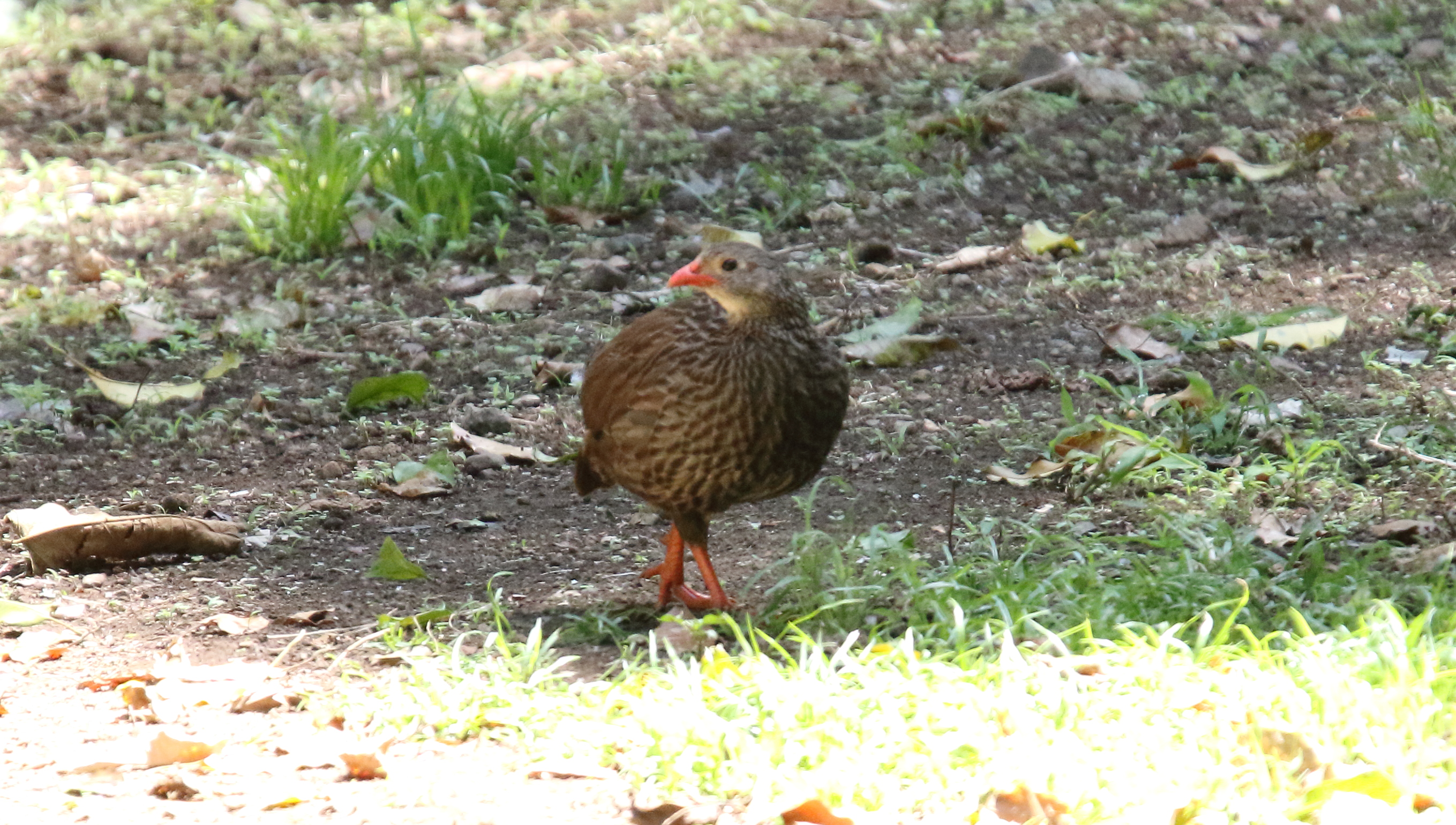
Scaly francolin

Order: Galliformes Family: Phasianidae

The Phasianidae are a family of terrestrial birds which consists of quails, partridges, snowcocks, francolins, spurfowls, tragopans, monals, pheasants, peafowls and jungle fowls. In general, they are plump (although they vary in size) and have broad, relatively short wings.

- Latham's francolin, Peliperdix lathami
- Crested francolin, Ortygornis sephaena
- Coqui francolin, Campocolinus coqui
- White-throated francolin, Campocolinus albogularis
- Red-winged francolin, Scleroptila levaillantii
- Finsch's francolin, Scleroptila finschi
- Orange River francolin, Scleroptila gutturalis
- Blue quail, Synoicus adansonii
- Common quail, Coturnix coturnix
- Harlequin quail, Coturnix delegorguei
- Hartlaub's francolin, Pternistis hartlaubi
- Swierstra's francolin, Pternistis swierstrai (E)
- Gray-striped francolin, Pternistis griseostriatus (E)
- Red-billed francolin, Pternistis adspersus
- Scaly francolin, Pternistis squamatus
- Swainson's francolin, Pternistis swainsonii
- Red-necked francolin, Pternistis afer

== Flamingos ==
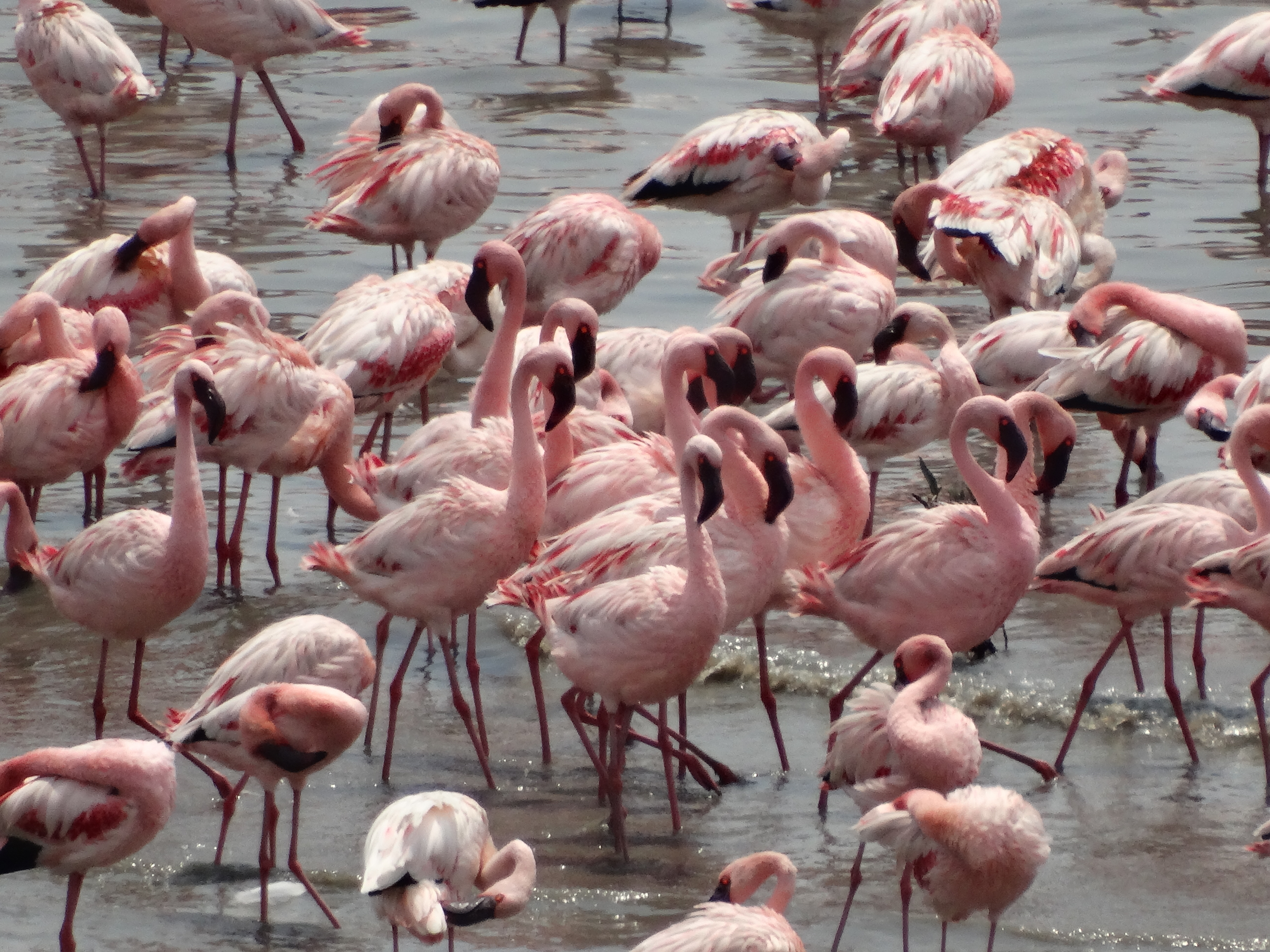
Lesser flamingo

Order: Phoenicopteriformes Family: Phoenicopteridae

Flamingos are gregarious wading birds, usually 1–1.5 m tall, found in both the Western and Eastern Hemispheres. Flamingos filter-feed on shellfish and algae. Their oddly shaped beaks are specially adapted to separate mud and silt from the food they consume and, uniquely, are used upside-down.

- Greater flamingo, Phoenicopterus roseus
- Lesser flamingo, Phoeniconaias minor

== Grebes ==
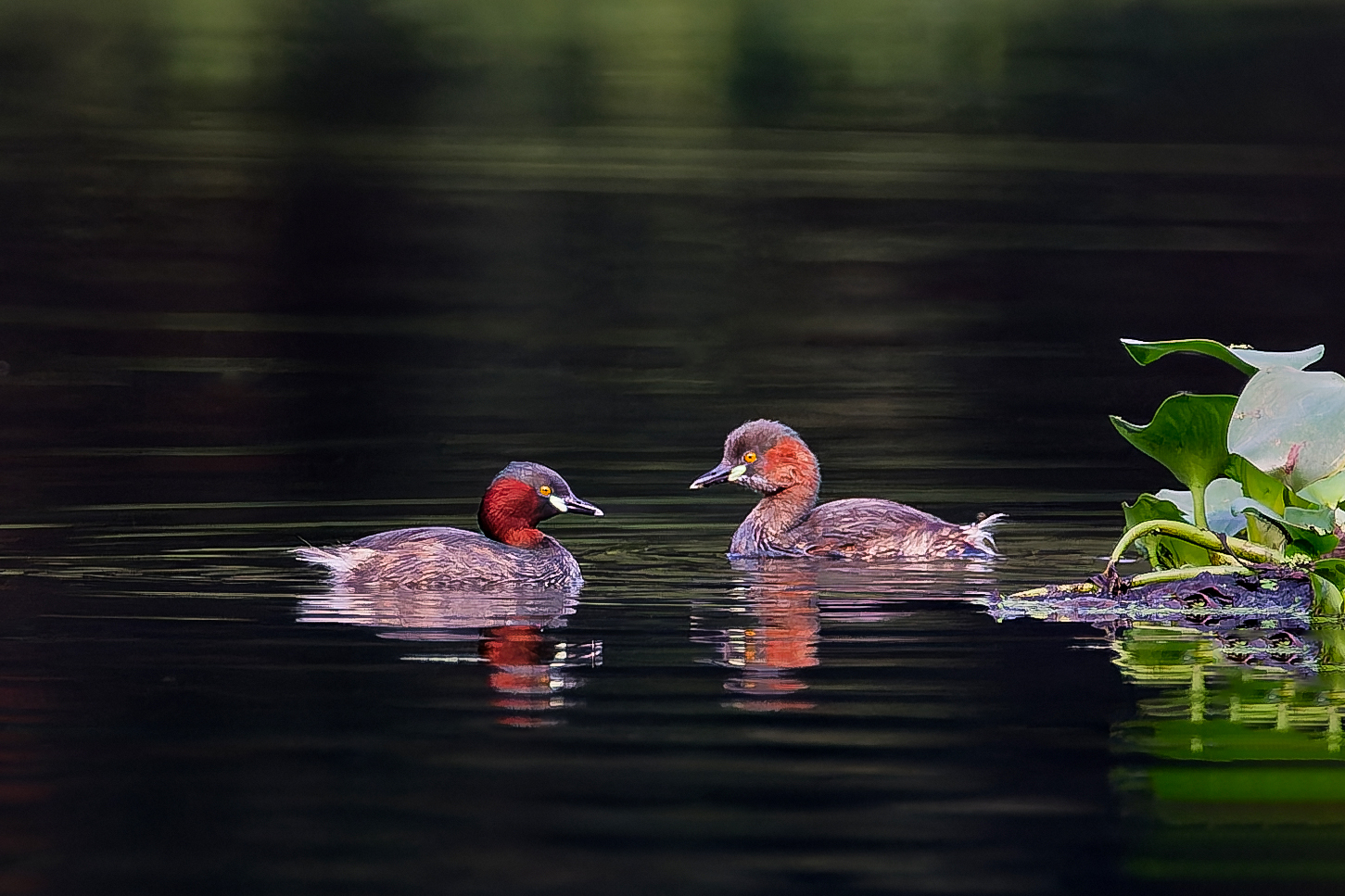
Little grebe

Order: Podicipediformes Family: Podicipedidae

Grebes are small to medium-large freshwater diving birds. They have lobed toes and are excellent swimmers and divers. However, they have their feet placed far back on the body, making them quite ungainly on land.

- Little grebe, Tachybaptus ruficollis
- Great crested grebe, Podiceps cristatus
- Eared grebe, Podiceps nigricollis (A)

== Pigeons and doves ==
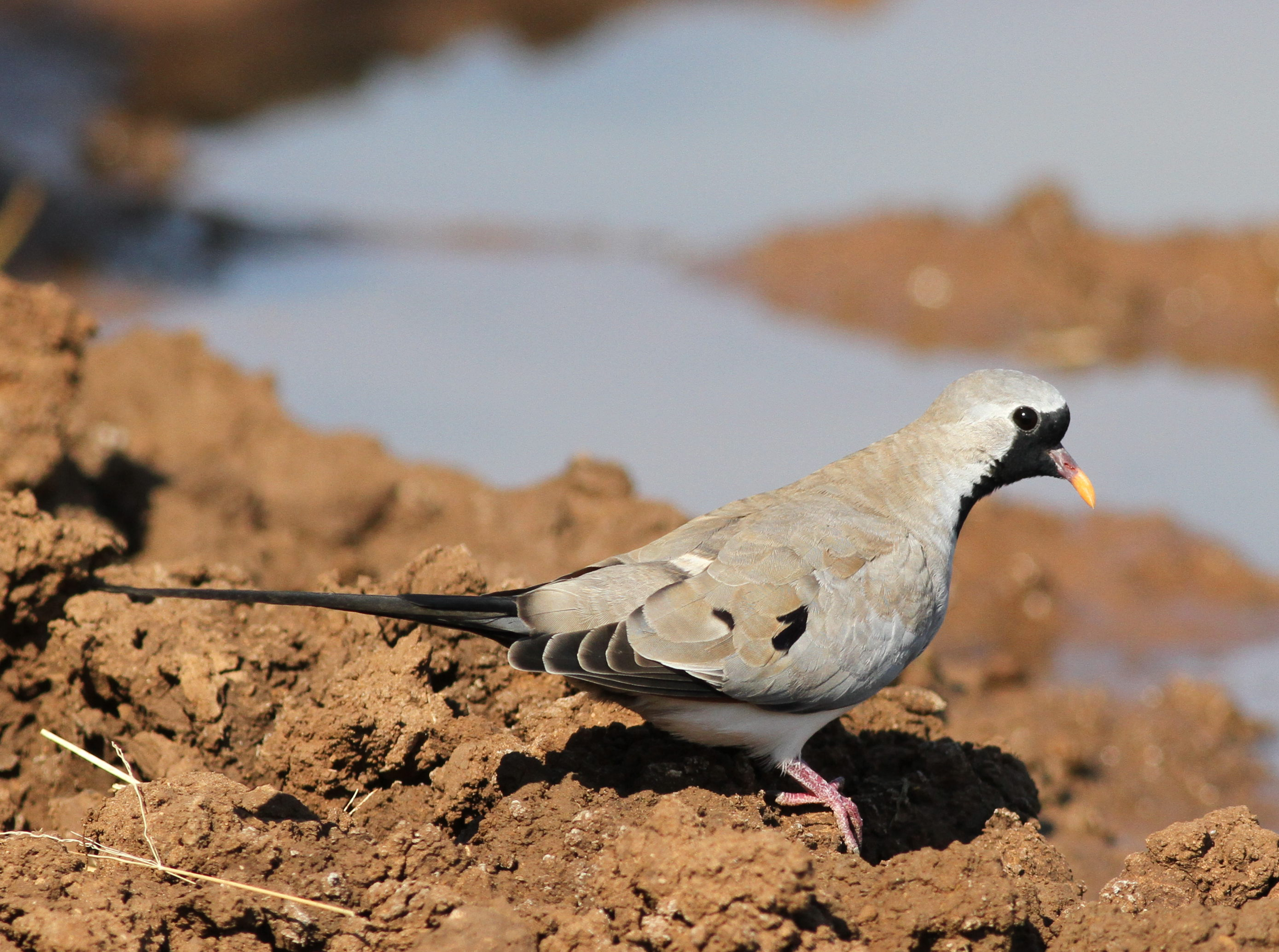
Namaqua dove

Order: Columbiformes Family: Columbidae

Pigeons and doves are stout-bodied birds with short necks and short slender bills with a fleshy cere.

- Rock pigeon, Columba livia (I)
- Speckled pigeon, Columba guinea
- Afep pigeon, Columba unicincta
- Rameron pigeon, Columba arquatrix
- Bronze-naped pigeon, Columba iriditorques
- Lemon dove, Columba larvata (A)
- Mourning collared-dove, Streptopelia decipiens
- Red-eyed dove, Streptopelia semitorquata
- Ring-necked dove, Streptopelia capicola
- Laughing dove, Streptopelia senegalensis
- Emerald-spotted wood-dove, Turtur chalcospilos
- Blue-spotted wood-dove, Turtur afer
- Tambourine dove, Turtur tympanistria
- Blue-headed wood-dove, Turtur brehmeri
- Namaqua dove, Oena capensis
- African green-pigeon, Treron calva

== Sandgrouse ==
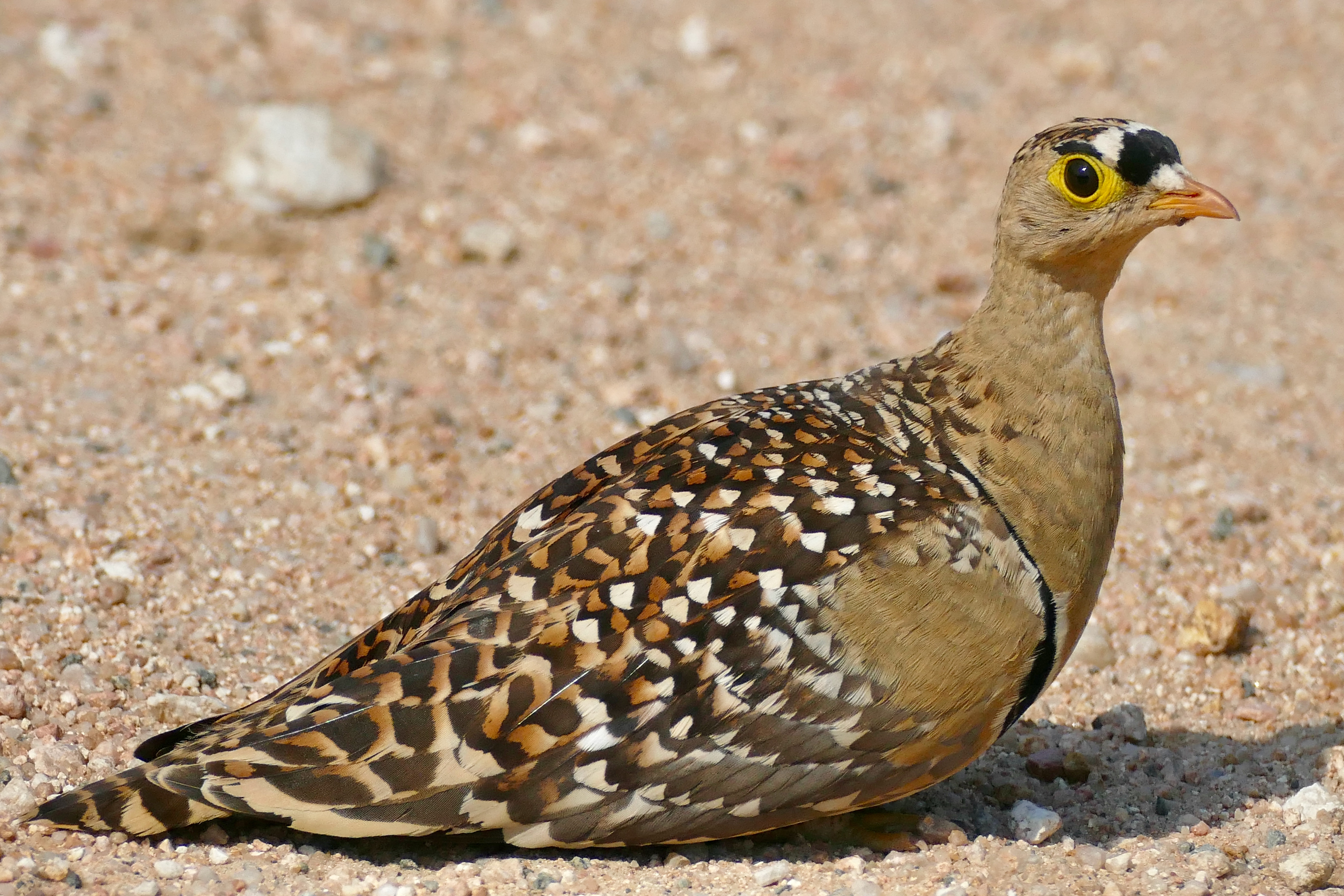
Double-banded sandgrouse

Order: Pterocliformes Family: Pteroclidae

Sandgrouse have small, pigeon like heads and necks, but sturdy compact bodies. They have long pointed wings and sometimes tails and a fast direct flight. Flocks fly to watering holes at dawn and dusk. Their legs are feathered down to the toes.

- Namaqua sandgrouse, Pterocles namaqua
- Yellow-throated sandgrouse, Pterocles gutturalis
- Double-banded sandgrouse, Pterocles bicinctus
- Burchell's sandgrouse, Pterocles burchelli

== Bustards ==
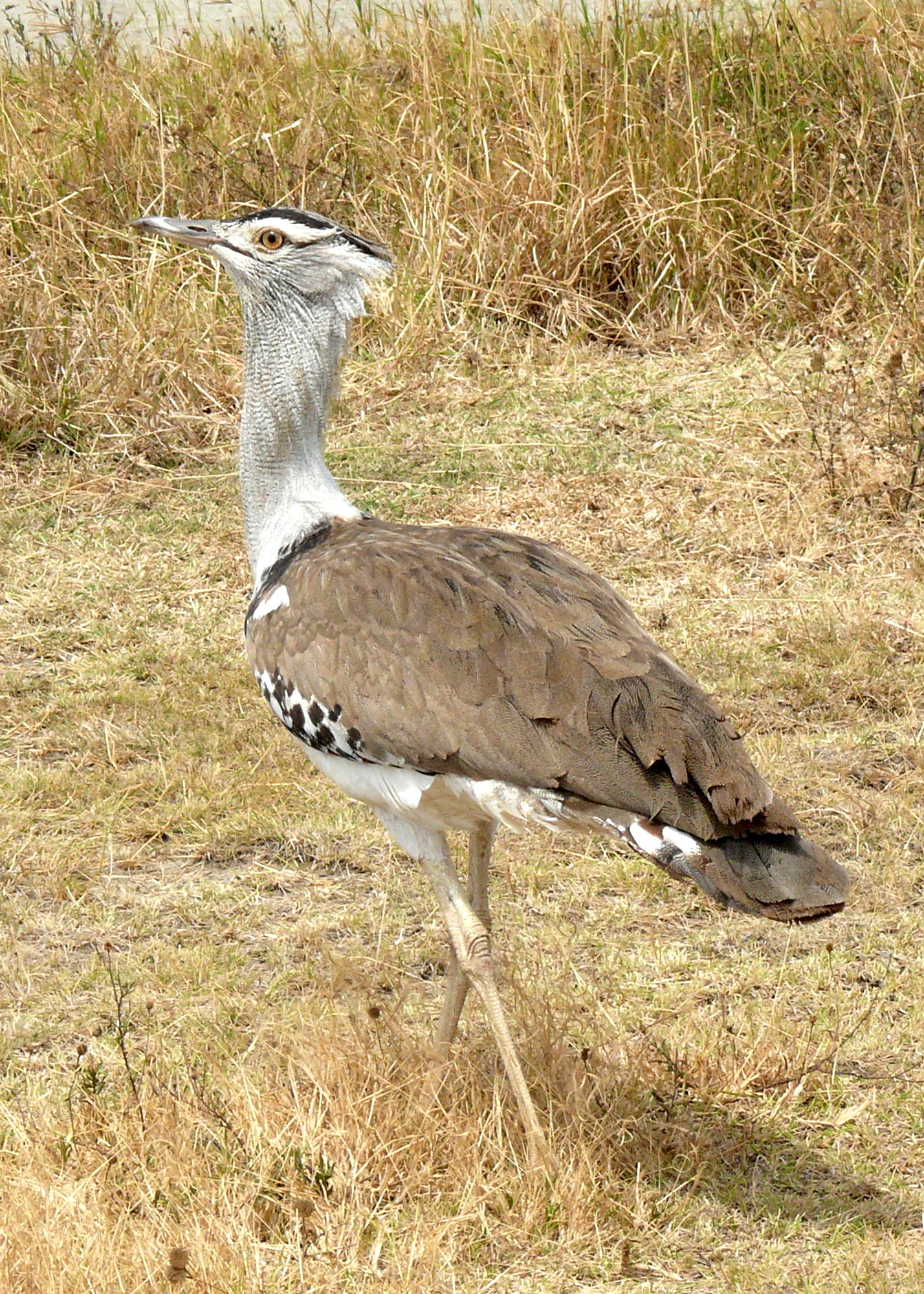
Kori bustard

Order: Otidiformes Family: Otididae

Bustards are large terrestrial birds mainly associated with dry open country and steppes in the Old World. They are omnivorous and nest on the ground. They walk steadily on strong legs and big toes, pecking for food as they go. They have long broad wings with "fingered" wingtips and striking patterns in flight. Many have interesting mating displays.

- Kori bustard, Ardeotis kori
- Ludwig's bustard, Neotis ludwigii
- Denham's bustard, Neotis denhami
- White-bellied bustard, Eupodotis senegalensis
- Rüppell's bustard, Eupodotis rueppellii
- Red-crested bustard, Lophotis ruficrista
- White-quilled bustard, Eupodotis afraoides
- Black-bellied bustard, Lissotis melanogaster

== Turacos ==
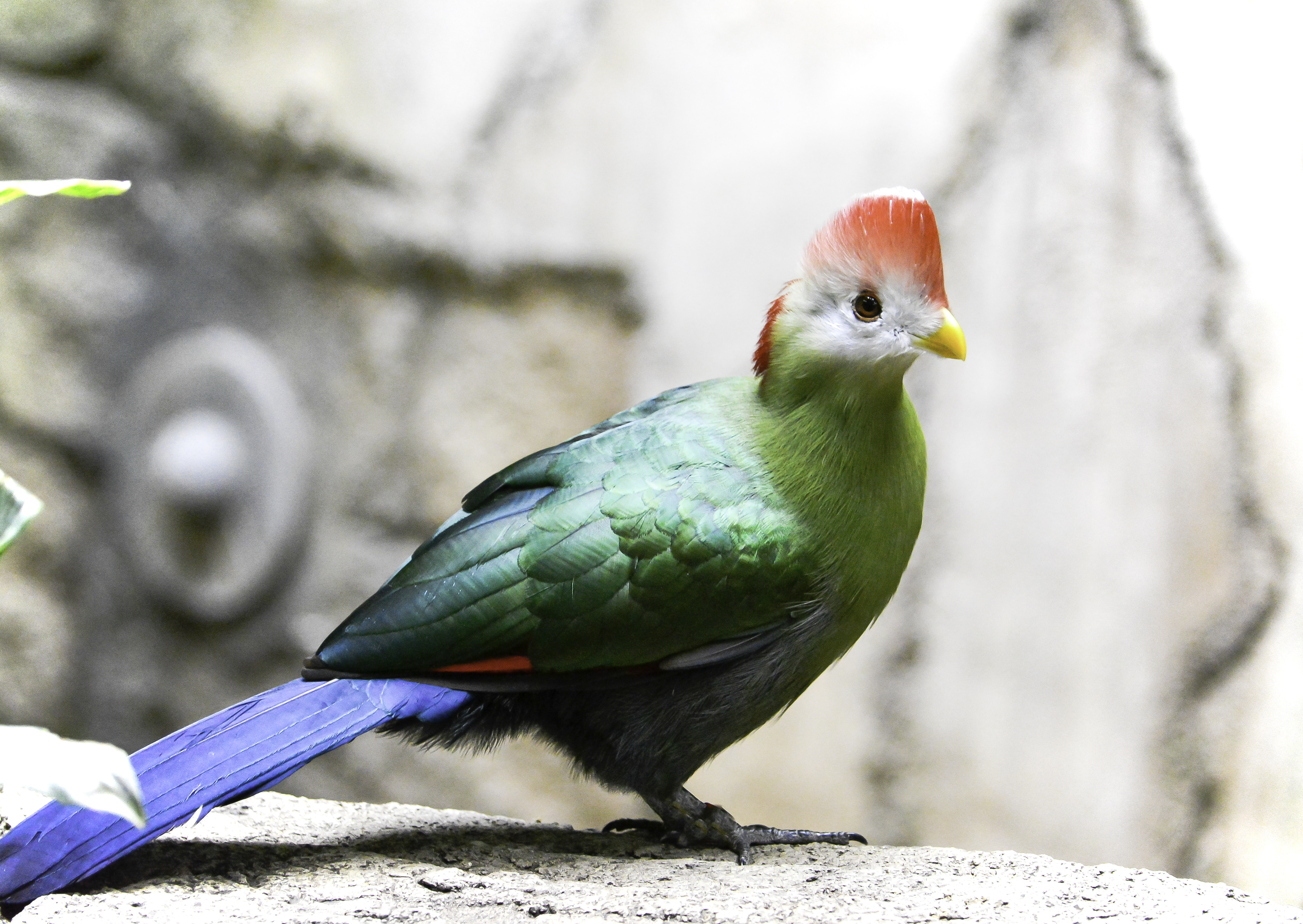
Red-crested turaco

Order: Musophagiformes Family: Musophagidae

The turacos, plantain eaters and go-away-birds make up the bird family Musophagidae. They are medium-sized arboreal birds. The turacos and plantain eaters are brightly coloured, usually in blue, green or purple. The go-away birds are mostly grey and white.

- Great blue turaco, Corythaeola cristata
- Guinea turaco, Tauraco persa
- Schalow's turaco, Tauraco schalowi
- Black-billed turaco, Tauraco schuettii
- Yellow-billed turaco, Tauraco macrorhynchus
- Red-crested turaco, Tauraco erythrolophus (E)
- Ross's turaco, Musophaga rossae
- Gray go-away-bird, Corythaixoides concolor

== Cuckoos ==
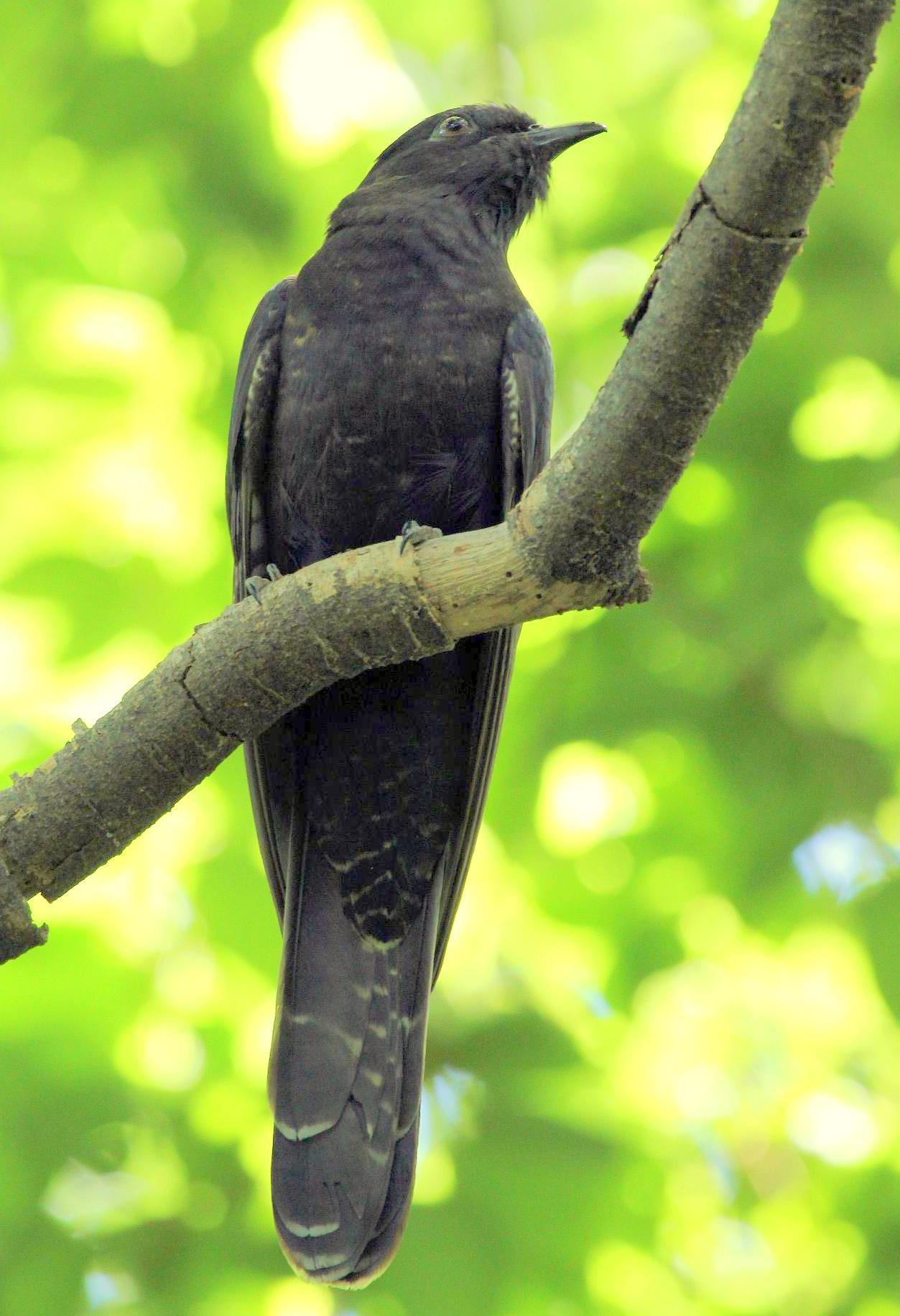
Black cuckoo

Order: Cuculiformes Family: Cuculidae

The family Cuculidae includes cuckoos, roadrunners and anis. These birds are of variable size with slender bodies, long tails and strong legs.

- Gabon coucal, Centropus anselli
- Senegal coucal, Centropus senegalensis
- Blue-headed coucal, Centropus monachus
- Coppery-tailed coucal, Centropus cupreicaudus
- White-browed coucal, Centropus superciliosus
- Black coucal, Centropus grillii
- Blue malkoha, Ceuthmochares aereus
- Great spotted cuckoo, Clamator glandarius
- Levaillant's cuckoo, Clamator levaillantii
- Pied cuckoo, Clamator jacobinus
- Thick-billed cuckoo, Pachycoccyx audeberti
- Dideric cuckoo, Chrysococcyx caprius
- Klaas's cuckoo, Chrysococcyx klaas
- Yellow-throated cuckoo, Chrysococcyx flavigularis (A)
- African emerald cuckoo, Chrysococcyx cupreus
- Dusky long-tailed cuckoo, Cercococcyx mechowi
- Olive long-tailed cuckoo, Cercococcyx olivinus
- Black cuckoo, Cuculus clamosus
- Red-chested cuckoo, Cuculus solitarius
- African cuckoo, Cuculus gularis
- Common cuckoo, Cuculus canorus

== Nightjars and allies ==
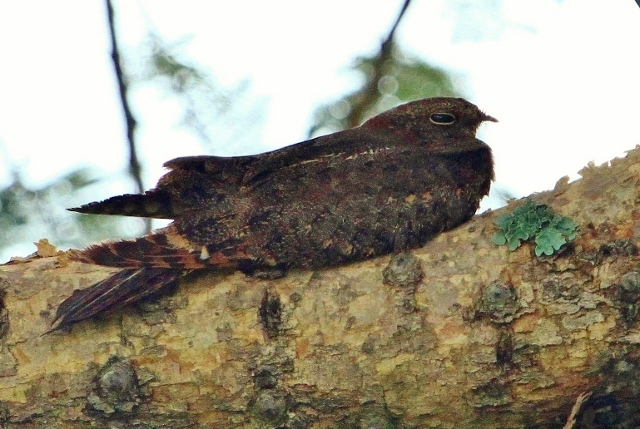
Pennant-winged nightjar

Order: Caprimulgiformes Family: Caprimulgidae

Nightjars are medium-sized nocturnal birds that usually nest on the ground. They have long wings, short legs and very short bills. Most have small feet, of little use for walking, and long pointed wings. Their soft plumage is camouflaged to resemble bark or leaves.

- Pennant-winged nightjar, Caprimulgus vexillarius
- Eurasian nightjar, Caprimulgus europaeus
- Rufous-cheeked nightjar, Caprimulgus rufigena
- Fiery-necked nightjar, Caprimulgus pectoralis
- Montane nightjar, Caprimulgus poliocephalus
- Swamp nightjar, Caprimulgus natalensis
- Freckled nightjar, Caprimulgus tristigma
- Long-tailed nightjar, Caprimulgus climacurus
- Square-tailed nightjar, Caprimulgus fossii

== Swifts ==
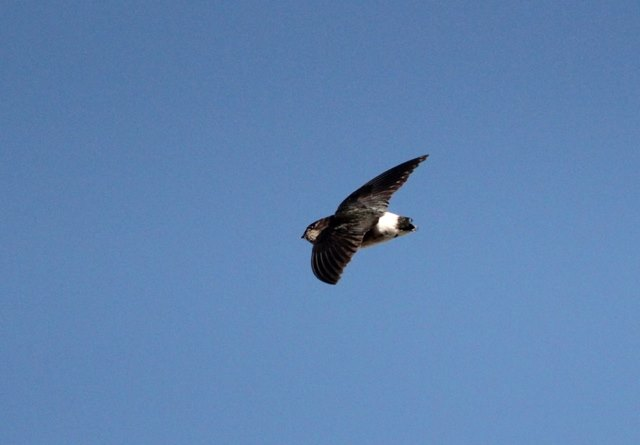
Bat-like spinetail

Order: Caprimulgiformes Family: Apodidae

Swifts are small birds which spend the majority of their lives flying. These birds have very short legs and never settle voluntarily on the ground, perching instead only on vertical surfaces. Many swifts have long swept-back wings which resemble a crescent or boomerang.

- Mottled spinetail, Telacanthura ussheri
- Black spinetail, Telacanthura melanopygia (A)
- Sabine's spinetail, Rhaphidura sabini
- Cassin's spinetail, Neafrapus cassini
- Bat-like spinetail, Neafrapus boehmi
- Scarce swift, Schoutedenapus myoptilus
- Alpine swift, Apus melba
- Mottled swift, Apus aequatorialis
- Common swift, Apus apus
- Pallid swift, Apus pallidus
- African swift, Apus barbatus (A)
- Bradfield's swift, Apus bradfieldi
- Little swift, Apus affinis
- Horus swift, Apus horus
- White-rumped swift, Apus caffer
- African palm-swift, Cypsiurus parvus

== Flufftails ==
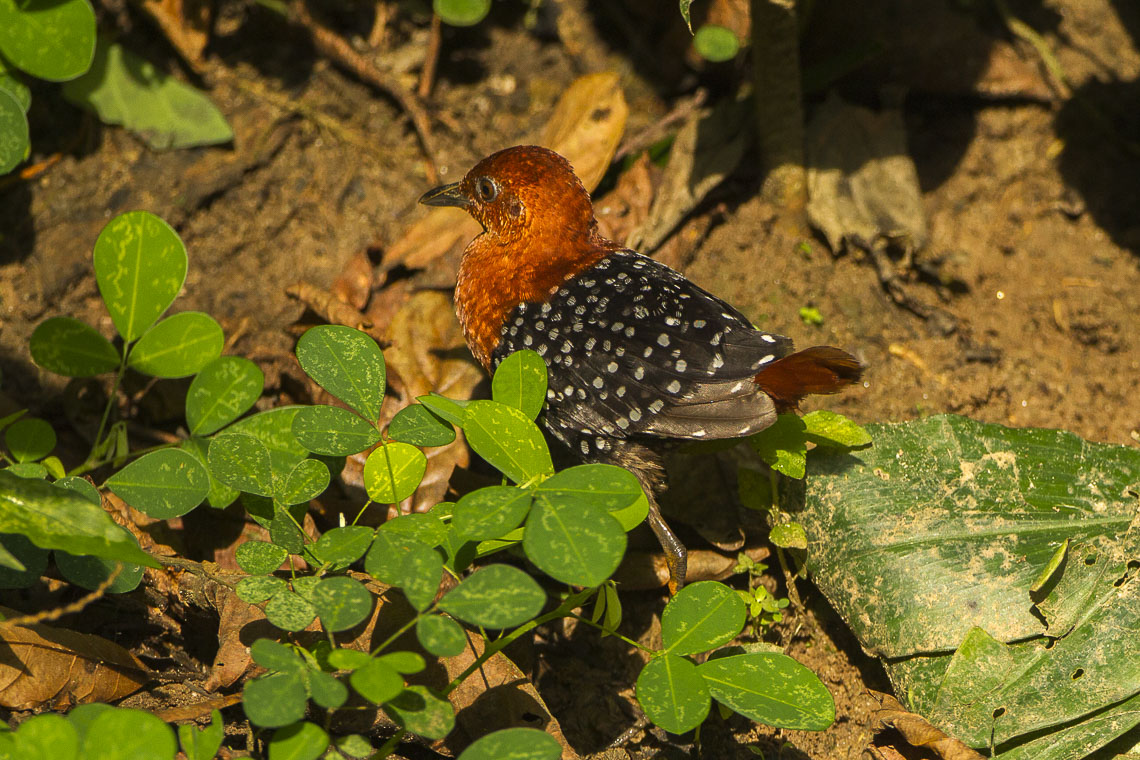
White-spotted flufftail

Order: Gruiformes Family: Sarothruridae

The flufftails are a small family of ground-dwelling birds found only in Madagascar and sub-Saharan Africa.

- White-spotted flufftail, Sarothrura pulchra
- Buff-spotted flufftail, Sarothrura elegans
- Red-chested flufftail, Sarothrura rufa
- Chestnut-headed flufftail, Sarothrura lugens
- Streaky-breasted flufftail, Sarothrura boehmi
- Striped flufftail, Sarothrura affinis

== Rails, gallinules, and coots ==
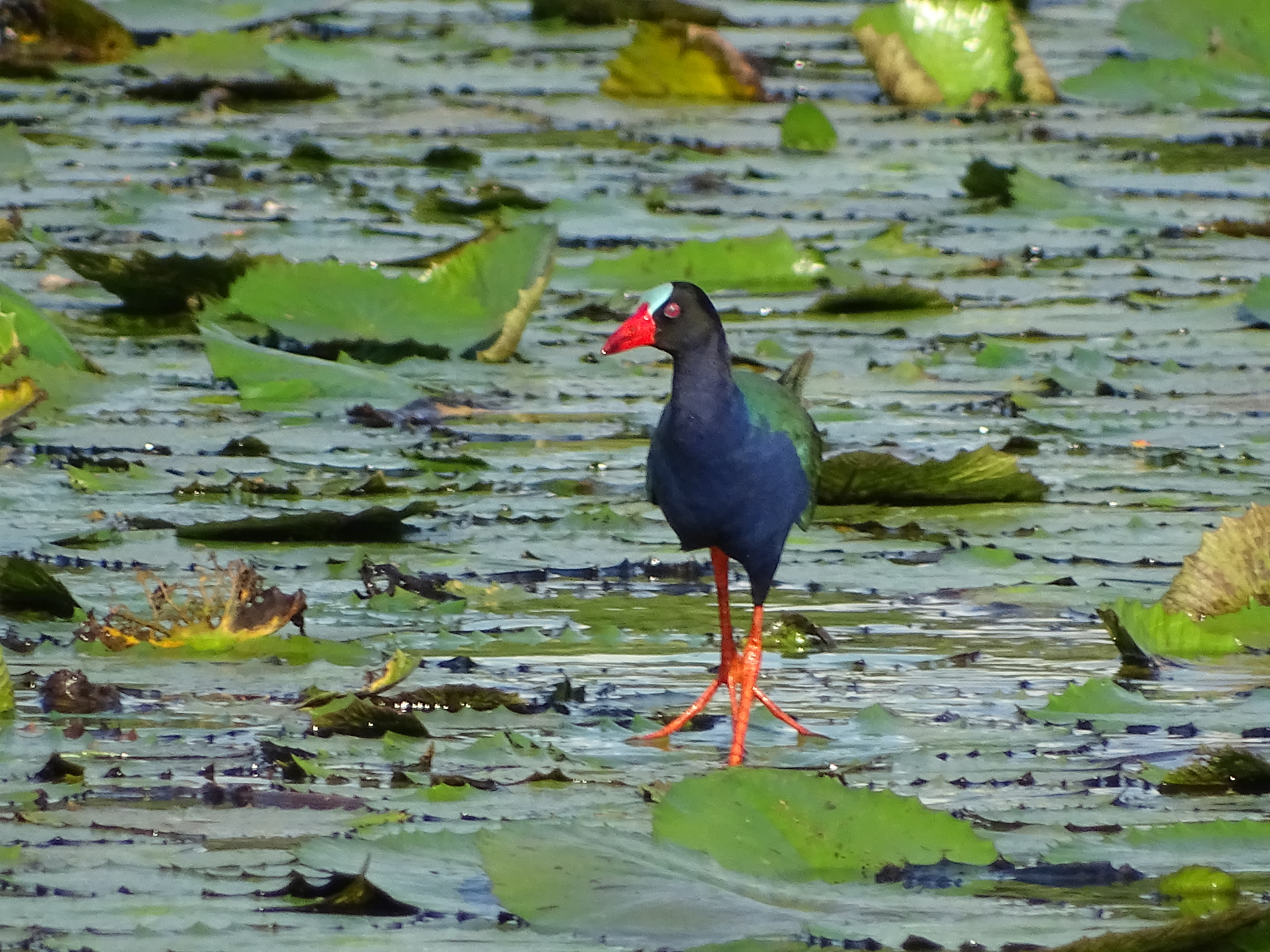
Allen's gallinule

Order: Gruiformes Family: Rallidae

Rallidae is a large family of small to medium-sized birds which includes the rails, crakes, coots and gallinules. Typically they inhabit dense vegetation in damp environments near lakes, swamps or rivers. In general they are shy and secretive birds, making them difficult to observe. Most species have strong legs and long toes which are well adapted to soft uneven surfaces. They tend to have short, rounded wings and to be weak fliers.

- African rail, Rallus caerulescens
- Corn crake, Crex crex (A)
- African crake, Crex egregia
- Spotted crake, Porzana porzana
- Lesser moorhen, Paragallinula angulata
- Eurasian moorhen, Gallinula chloropus
- Red-knobbed coot, Fulica cristata
- Allen's gallinule, Porphyrio alleni
- African swamphen, Porphyrio madagascariensis
- Nkulengu rail, Himantornis haematopus
- Striped crake, Amaurornis marginalis
- Black crake, Zapornia flavirostris
- Baillon's crake, Zapornia pusilla

== Finfoots ==
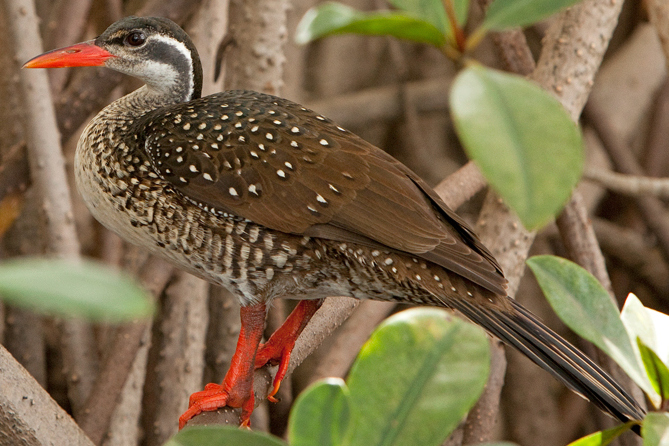
African finfoot

Order: Gruiformes Family: Heliornithidae

Heliornithidae is a small family of tropical birds with webbed lobes on their feet similar to those of grebes and coots.

- African finfoot, Podica senegalensis

== Cranes ==
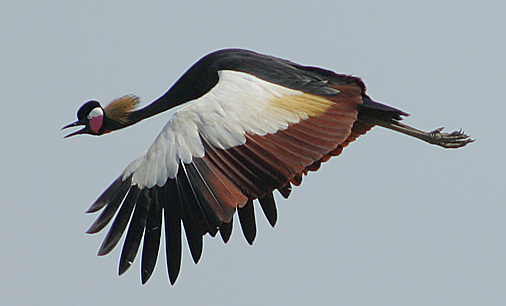
Black crowned-crane

Order: Gruiformes Family: Gruidae

Cranes are large, long-legged and long-necked birds. Unlike the similar-looking but unrelated herons, cranes fly with necks outstretched, not pulled back. Most have elaborate and noisy courting displays or "dances".

- Gray crowned-crane, Balearica regulorum
- Black crowned-crane, Balearica pavonina
- Wattled crane, Bugeranus carunculatus

== Thick-knees ==
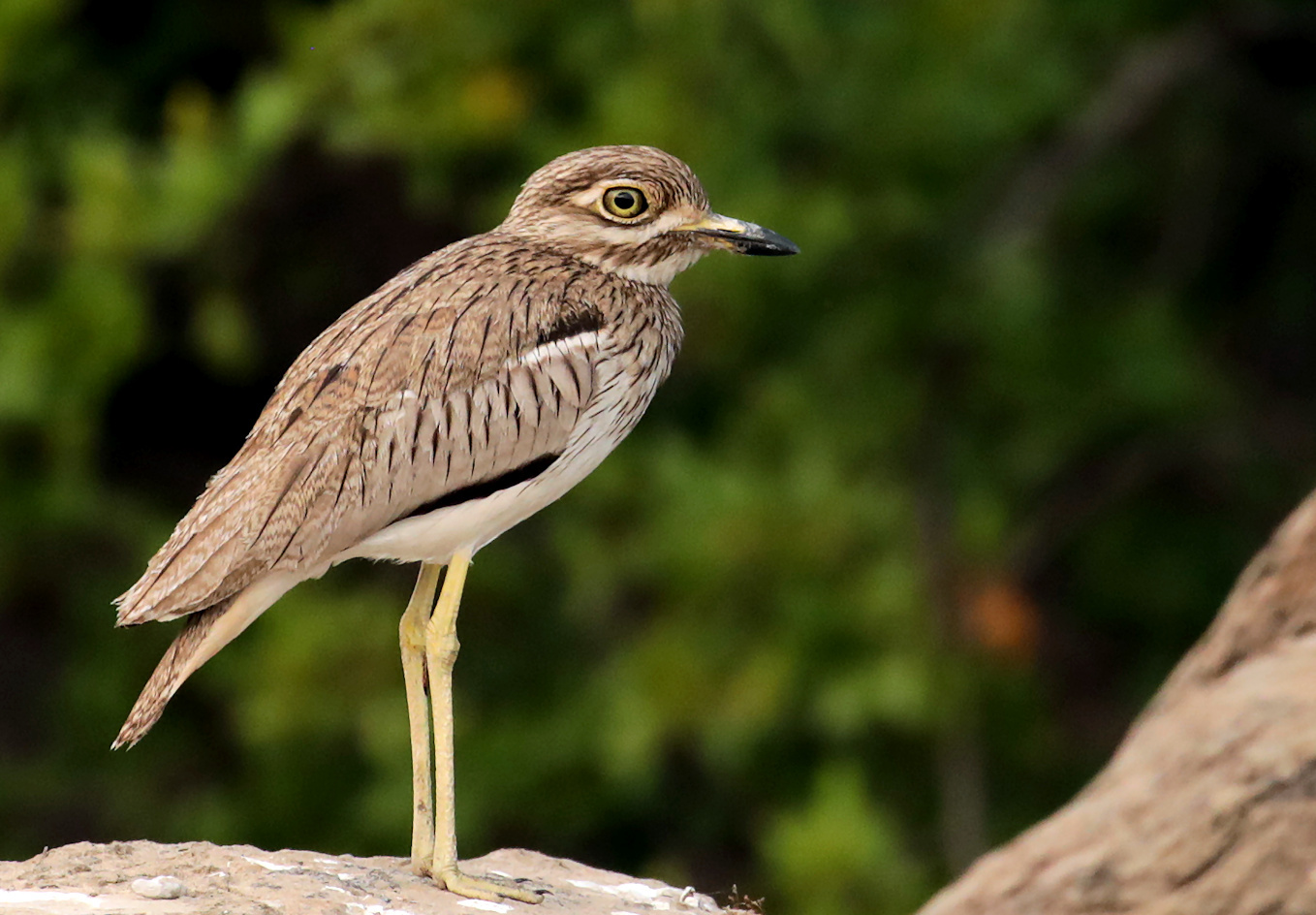
Water thick-knee

Order: Charadriiformes Family: Burhinidae

The thick-knees are a group of largely tropical waders in the family Burhinidae. They are found worldwide within the tropical zone, with some species also breeding in temperate Europe and Australia. They are medium to large waders with strong black or yellow-black bills, large yellow eyes and cryptic plumage. Despite being classed as waders, most species have a preference for arid or semi-arid habitats.

- Water thick-knee, Burhinus vermiculatus
- Spotted thick-knee, Burhinus capensis

== Egyptian plover ==
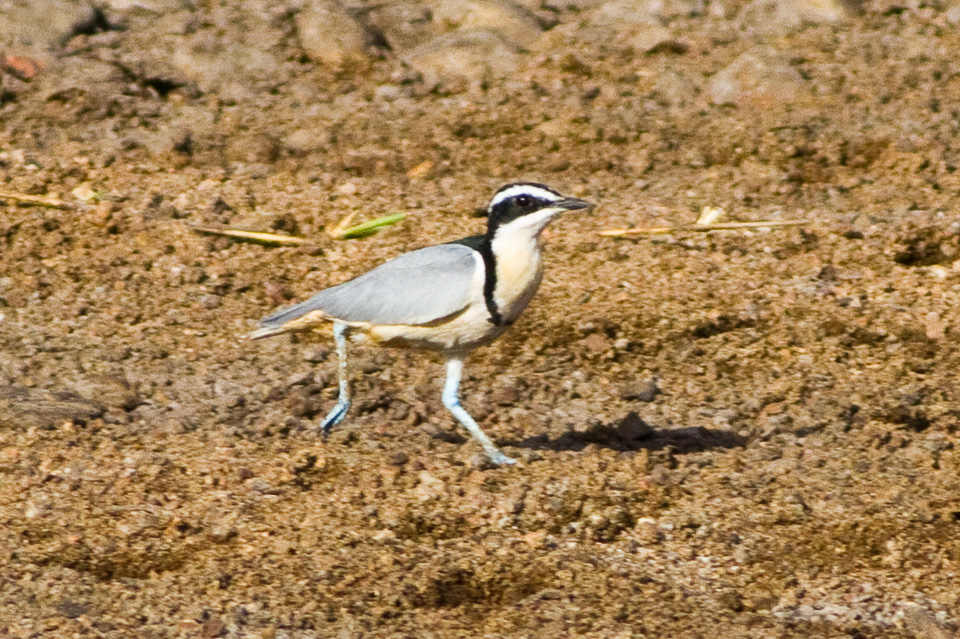
Egyptian plover

Order: Charadriiformes Family: Pluvianidae

The Egyptian plover is found across equatorial Africa and along the Nile River.

- Egyptian plover, Pluvianus aegyptius

== Stilts and avocets ==
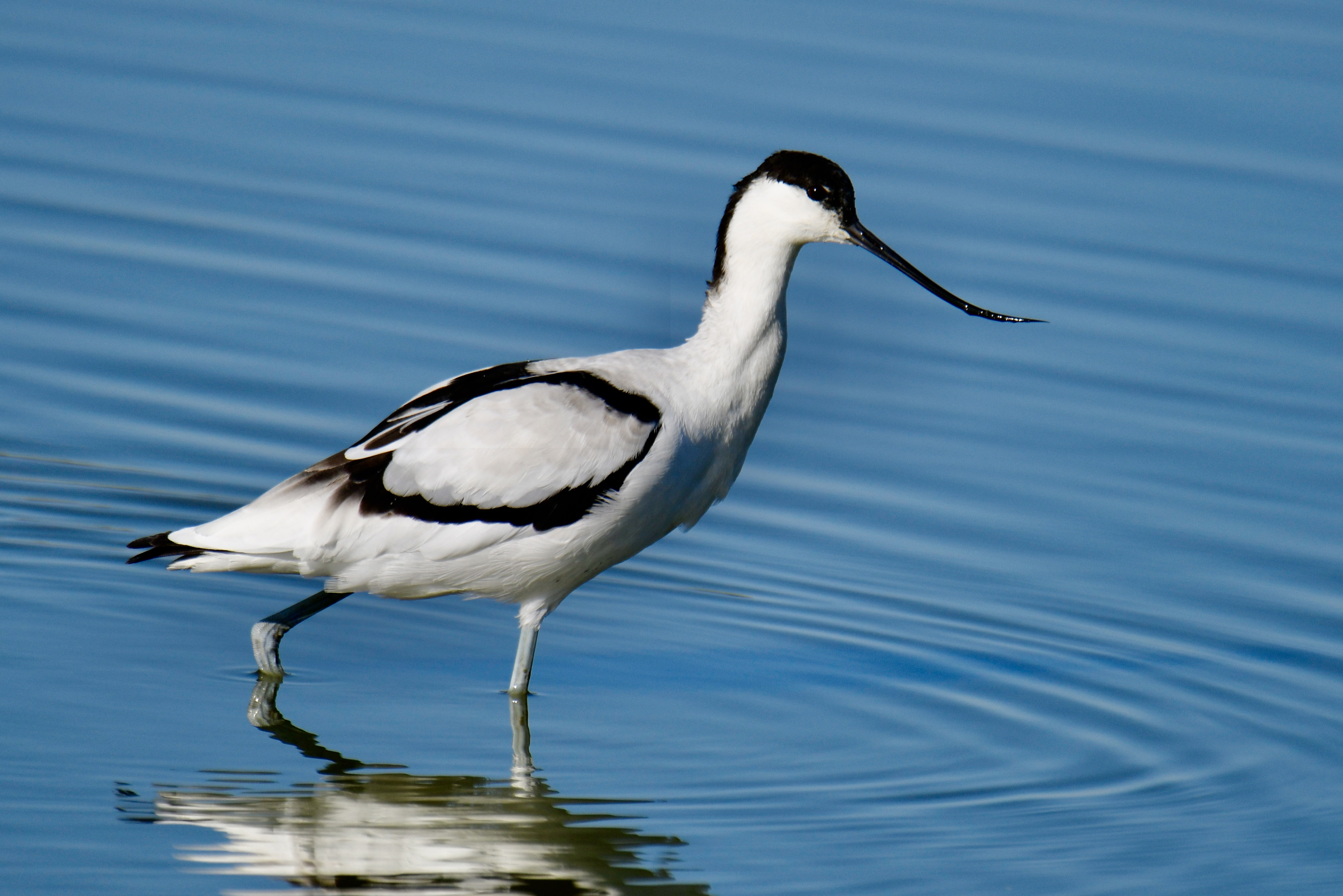
Pied avocet

Order: Charadriiformes Family: Recurvirostridae

Recurvirostridae is a family of large wading birds, which includes the avocets and stilts. The avocets have long legs and long up-curved bills. The stilts have extremely long legs and long, thin, straight bills. There are 9 species worldwide and 2 species which occur in Angola.

- Black-winged stilt, Himantopus himantopus
- Pied avocet, Recurvirostra avosetta

== Oystercatchers ==
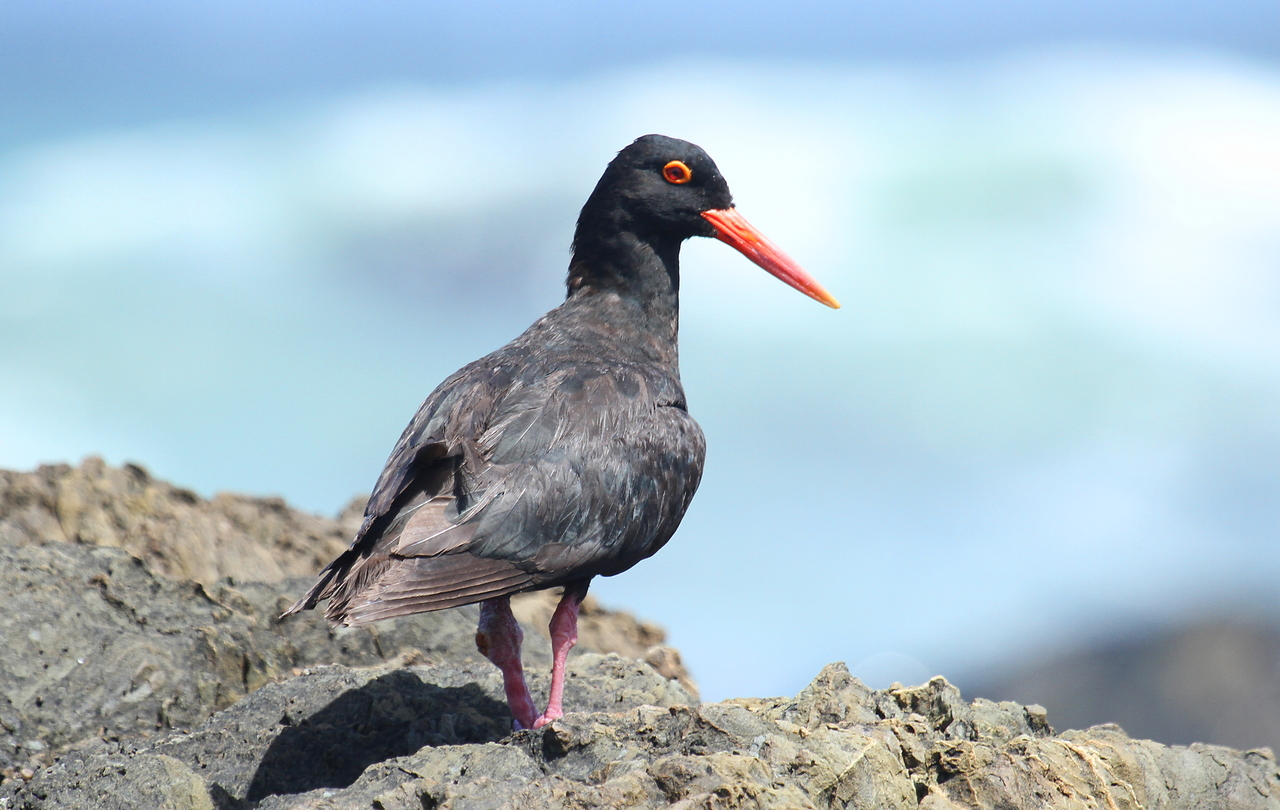
African oystercatcher

Order: Charadriiformes Family: Haematopodidae

The oystercatchers are large and noisy plover-like birds, with strong bills used for smashing or prising open molluscs.

- Eurasian oystercatcher, Haematopus ostralegus
- African oystercatcher, Haematopus moquini

== Plovers and lapwings ==
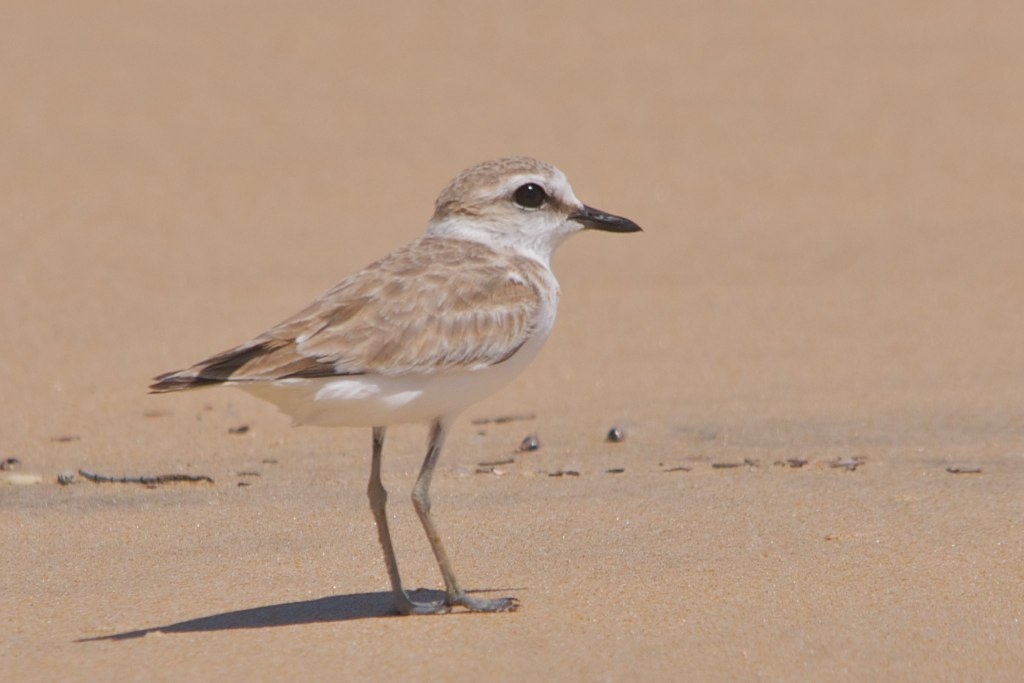
White-fronted plover

Order: Charadriiformes Family: Charadriidae

The family Charadriidae includes the plovers, dotterels and lapwings. They are small to medium-sized birds with compact bodies, short, thick necks and long, usually pointed, wings. They are found in open country worldwide, mostly in habitats near water.

- Black-bellied plover, Pluvialis squatarola
- Pacific golden-plover, Pluvialis fulva (A)
- Long-toed lapwing, Vanellus crassirostris
- Blacksmith lapwing, Vanellus armatus
- Spur-winged lapwing, Vanellus spinosus
- White-headed lapwing, Vanellus albiceps
- Senegal lapwing, Vanellus lugubris
- Crowned lapwing, Vanellus coronatus
- Wattled lapwing, Vanellus senegallus
- Caspian plover, Charadrius asiaticus
- Kittlitz's plover, Charadrius pecuarius
- Kentish plover, Charadrius alexandrinus
- Common ringed plover, Charadrius hiaticula
- Three-banded plover, Charadrius tricollaris
- Forbes's plover, Charadrius forbesi
- White-fronted plover, Charadrius marginatus
- Chestnut-banded plover, Charadrius pallidus

== Painted-snipes ==
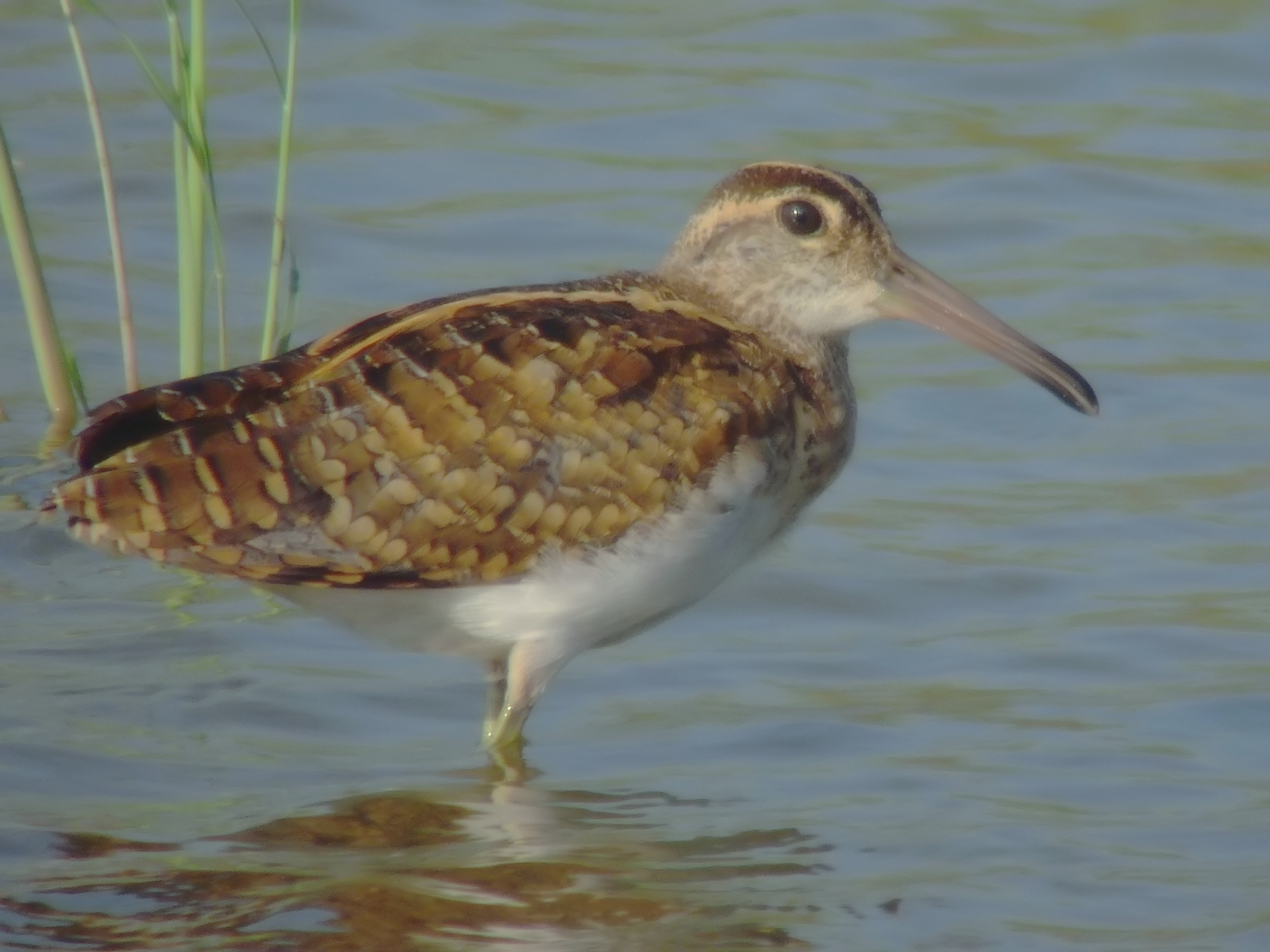
Greater painted-snipe

Order: Charadriiformes Family: Rostratulidae

Painted-snipes are short-legged, long-billed birds similar in shape to the true snipes, but more brightly coloured.

- Greater painted-snipe, Rostratula benghalensis

== Jacanas ==
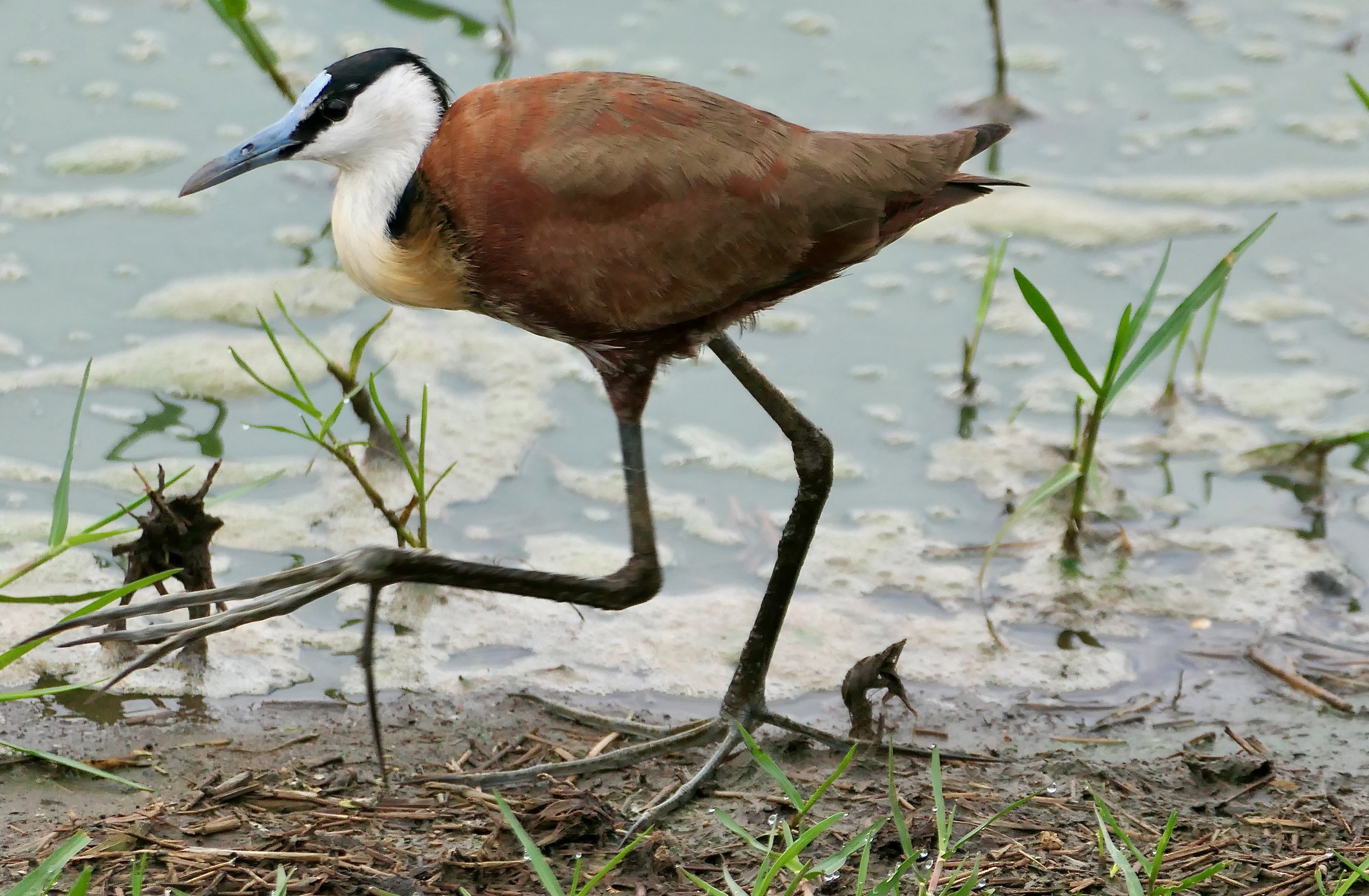
African jacana

Order: Charadriiformes Family: Jacanidae

The jacanas are a group of tropical waders in the family Jacanidae. They are found throughout the tropics. They are identifiable by their huge feet and claws which enable them to walk on floating vegetation in the shallow lakes that are their preferred habitat.

- Lesser jacana, Microparra capensis
- African jacana, Actophilornis africanus

== Sandpipers and allies ==
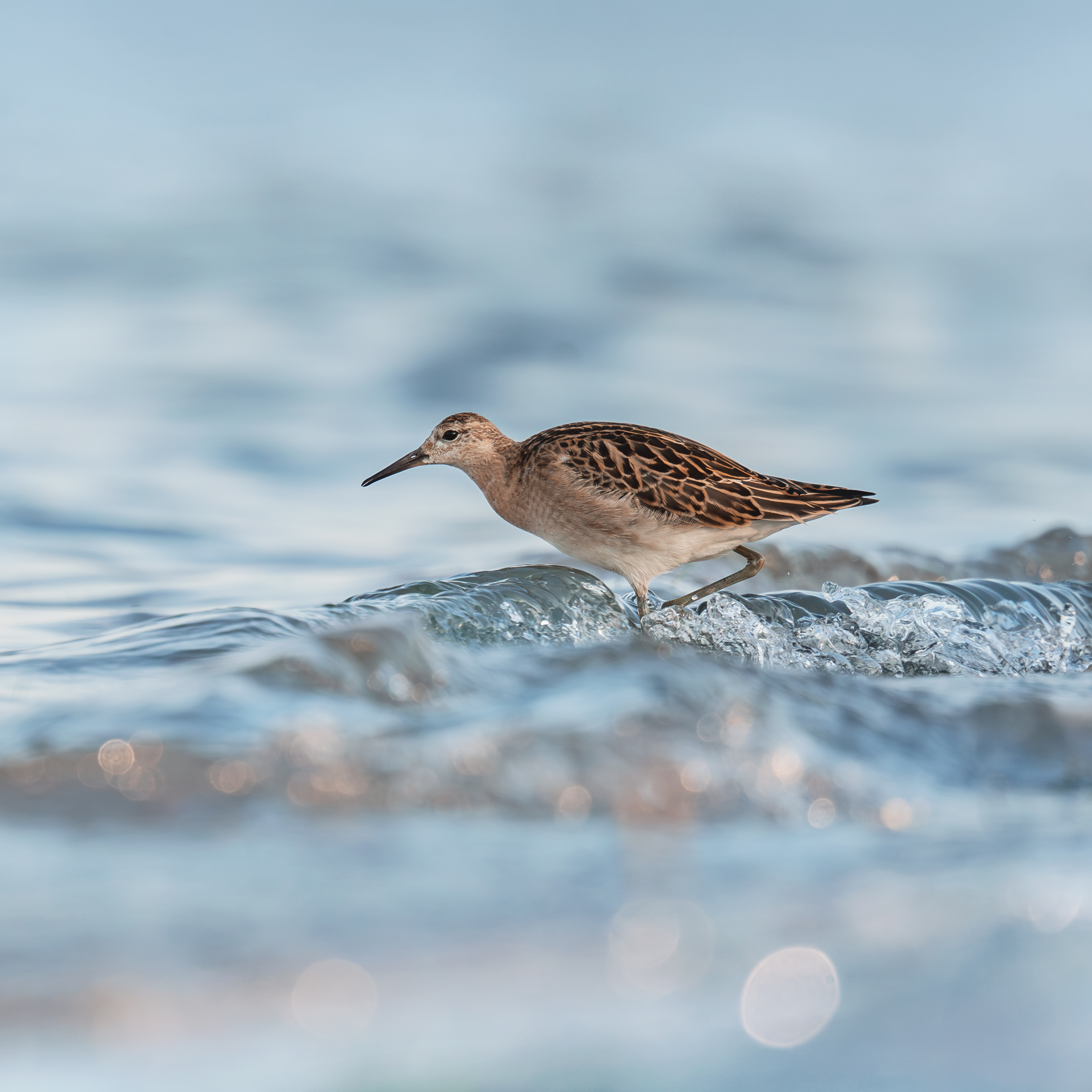
Ruff

Order: Charadriiformes Family: Scolopacidae

Scolopacidae is a large diverse family of small to medium-sized shorebirds including the sandpipers, curlews, godwits, shanks, tattlers, woodcocks, snipes, dowitchers and phalaropes. The majority of these species eat small invertebrates picked out of the mud or soil. Variation in length of legs and bills enables multiple species to feed in the same habitat, particularly on the coast, without direct competition for food.

- Whimbrel, Numenius phaeopus
- Eurasian curlew, Numenius arquata
- Bar-tailed godwit, Limosa lapponica
- Black-tailed godwit, Limosa limosa (A)
- Ruddy turnstone, Arenaria interpres
- Red knot, Calidris canutus
- Ruff, Calidris pugnax
- Curlew sandpiper, Calidris ferruginea
- Sanderling, Calidris alba
- Dunlin, Calidris alpina (A)
- Little stint, Calidris minuta
- Great snipe, Gallinago media
- African snipe, Gallinago nigripennis
- Terek sandpiper, Xenus cinereus (A)
- Red phalarope, Phalaropus fulicarius (A)
- Common sandpiper, Actitis hypoleucos
- Green sandpiper, Tringa ochropus
- Solitary sandpiper, Tringa solitaria (A)
- Common greenshank, Tringa nebularia
- Marsh sandpiper, Tringa stagnatilis
- Wood sandpiper, Tringa glareola
- Common redshank, Tringa totanus

== Buttonquail ==
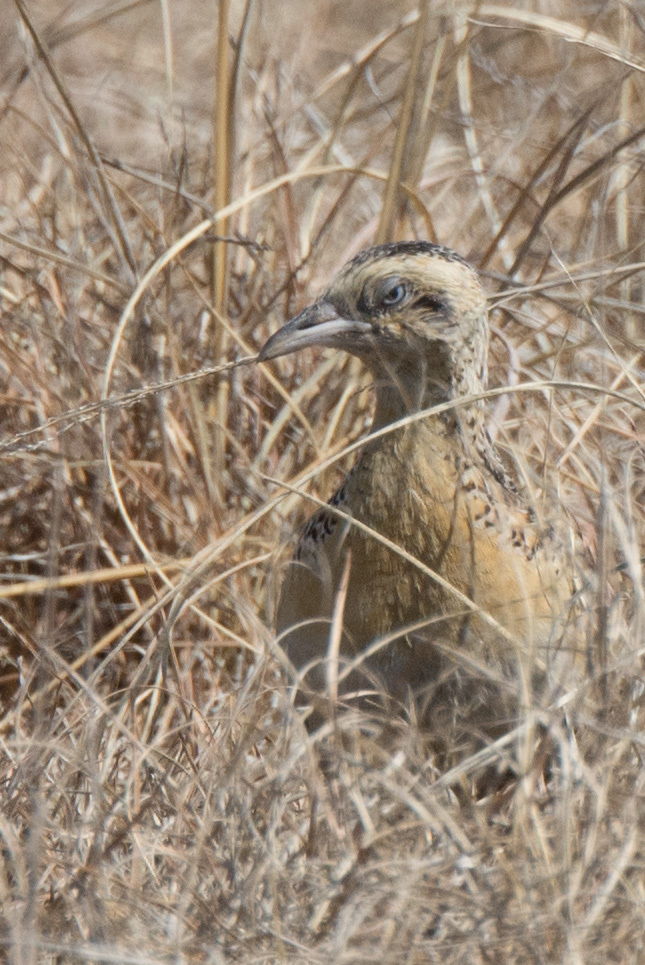
Small buttonquail

Order: Charadriiformes Family: Turnicidae

The buttonquail are small, drab, running birds which resemble the true quails. The female is the brighter of the sexes and initiates courtship. The male incubates the eggs and tends the young.

- Small buttonquail, Turnix sylvaticus
- Black-rumped buttonquail, Turnix nanus

== Pratincoles and coursers ==
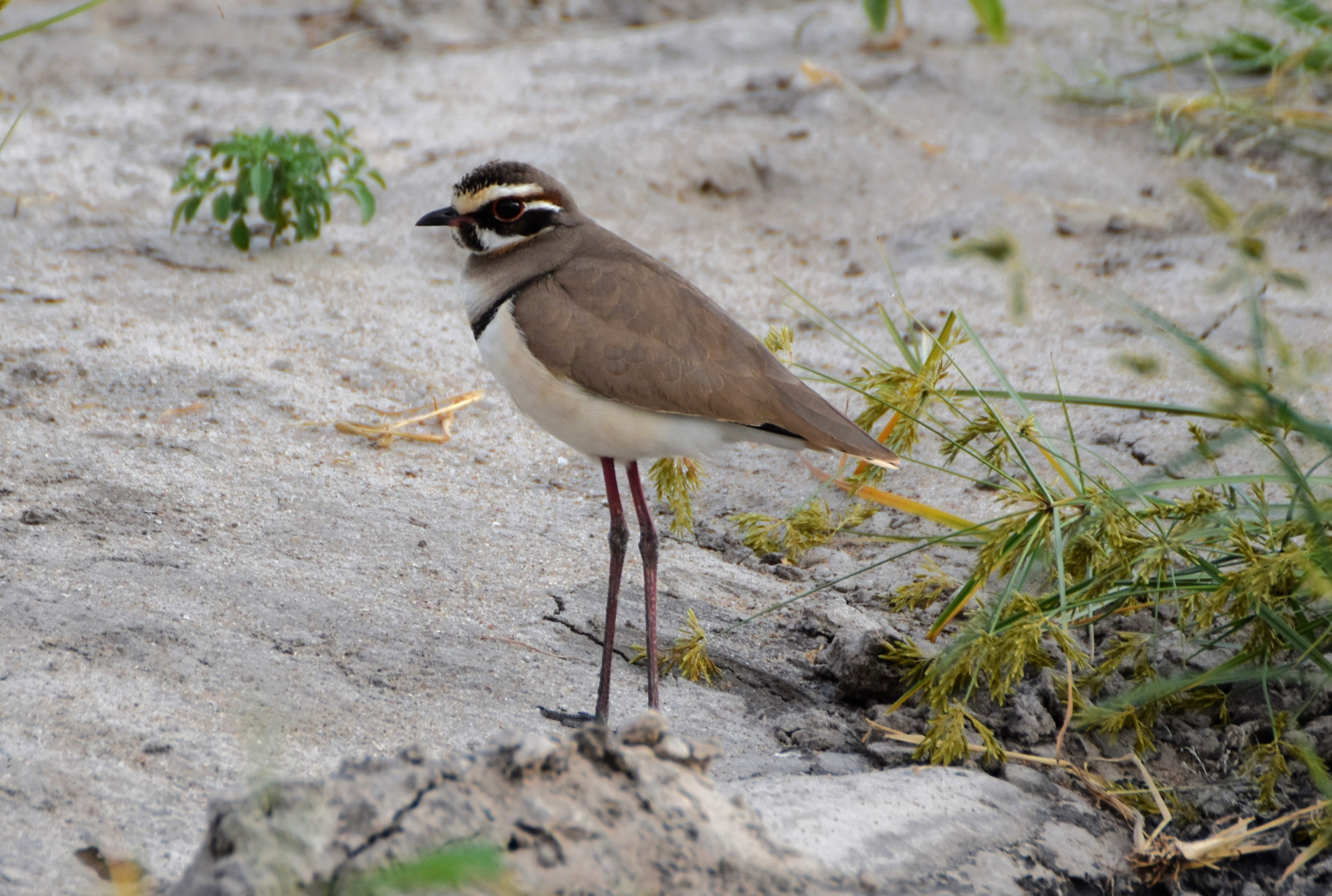
Bronze-winged courser

Order: Charadriiformes Family: Glareolidae

Glareolidae is a family of wading birds comprising the pratincoles, which have short legs, long pointed wings and long forked tails, and the coursers, which have long legs, short wings and long, pointed bills which curve downwards.

- Burchell's courser, Cursorius rufus
- Temminck's courser, Cursorius temminckii
- Double-banded courser, Smutsornis africanus
- Three-banded courser, Rhinoptilus cinctus
- Bronze-winged courser, Rhinoptilus chalcopterus
- Collared pratincole, Glareola pratincola
- Black-winged pratincole, Glareola nordmanni
- Rock pratincole, Glareola nuchalis
- Gray pratincole, Glareola cinerea

== Skuas and jaegers ==
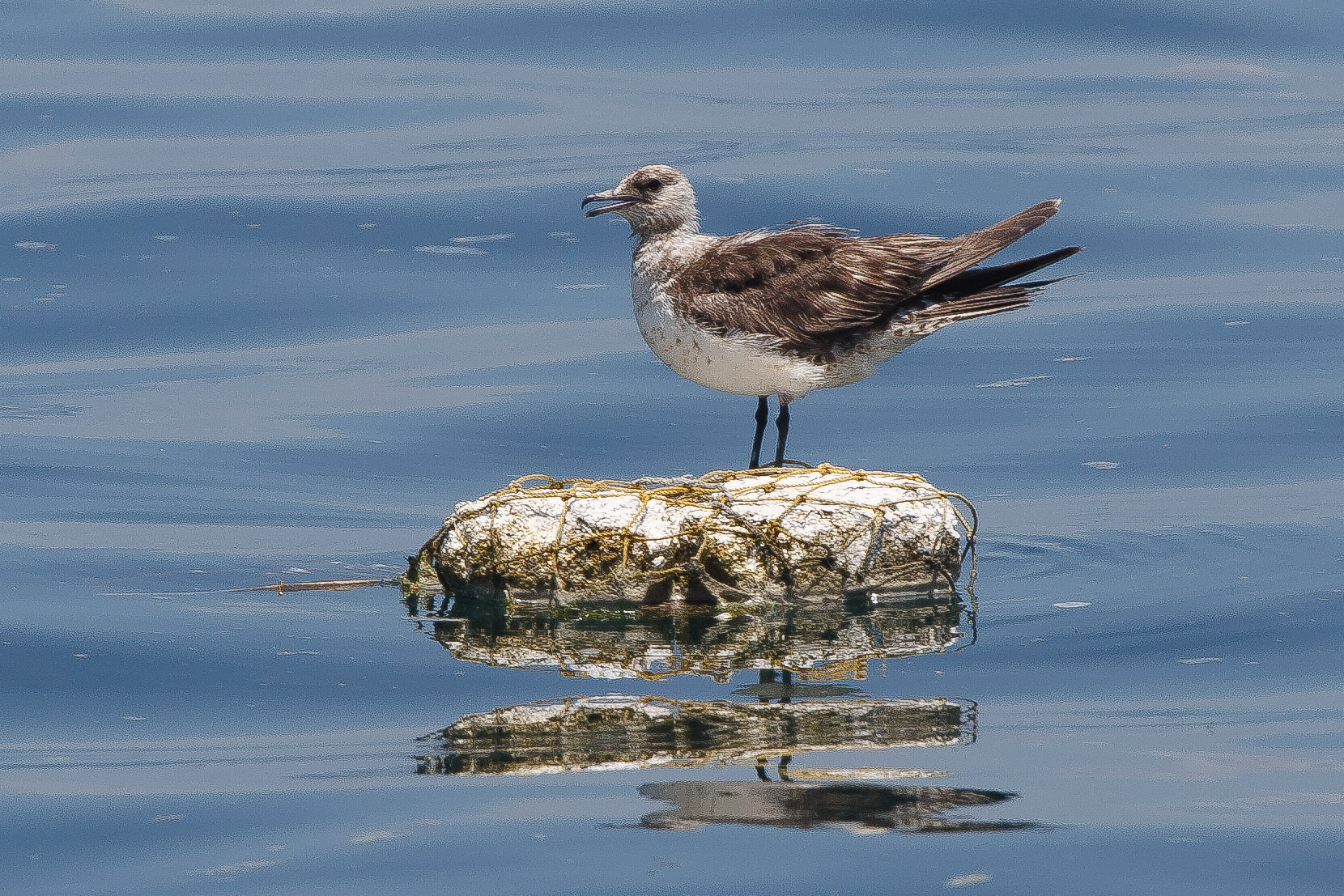
Parasitic jaeger

Order: Charadriiformes Family: Stercorariidae

The family Stercorariidae are, in general, medium to large birds, typically with grey or brown plumage, often with white markings on the wings. They nest on the ground in temperate and arctic regions and are long-distance migrants.

- Brown skua, Stercorarius antarctica (A)
- Pomarine jaeger, Stercorarius pomarinus
- Parasitic jaeger, Stercorarius parasiticus
- Long-tailed jaeger, Stercorarius longicaudus (A)

== Gulls, terns, and skimmers ==
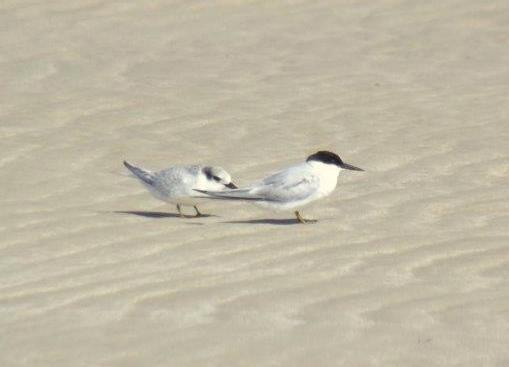
Damara tern

Order: Charadriiformes Family: Laridae

Laridae is a family of medium to large seabirds, the gulls, terns, and skimmers. Gulls are typically grey or white, often with black markings on the head or wings. They have stout, longish bills and webbed feet. Terns are a group of generally medium to large seabirds typically with grey or white plumage, often with black markings on the head. Most terns hunt fish by diving but some pick insects off the surface of fresh water. Terns are generally long-lived birds, with several species known to live in excess of 30 years. Skimmers are a small family of tropical tern-like birds. They have an elongated lower mandible which they use to feed by flying low over the water surface and skimming the water for small fish.

- Sabine's gull, Xema sabini (A)
- Gray-hooded gull, Chroicocephalus cirrocephalus
- Black-headed gull, Chroicocephalus ridibundus (A)
- Little gull, Hydrocoloeus minutus (A)
- Franklin's gull, Leucophaeus pipixcan (A)
- Lesser black-backed gull, Larus fuscus
- Kelp gull, Larus dominicanus
- Brown noddy, Anous stolidus
- Sooty tern, Onychoprion fuscatus
- Little tern, Sternula albifrons (A)
- Damara tern, Sternula balaenarum
- Gull-billed tern, Gelochelidon nilotica (A)
- Caspian tern, Hydroprogne caspia
- Black tern, Chlidonias niger
- White-winged tern, Chlidonias leucopterus
- Whiskered tern, Chlidonias hybrida
- Roseate tern, Sterna dougallii
- Common tern, Sterna hirundo
- Arctic tern, Sterna paradisaea
- Great crested tern, Thalasseus bergii (A)
- Sandwich tern, Thalasseus sandvicensis
- West African crested tern, Thalasseus albididorsalis
- African skimmer, Rynchops flavirostris

== Tropicbirds ==
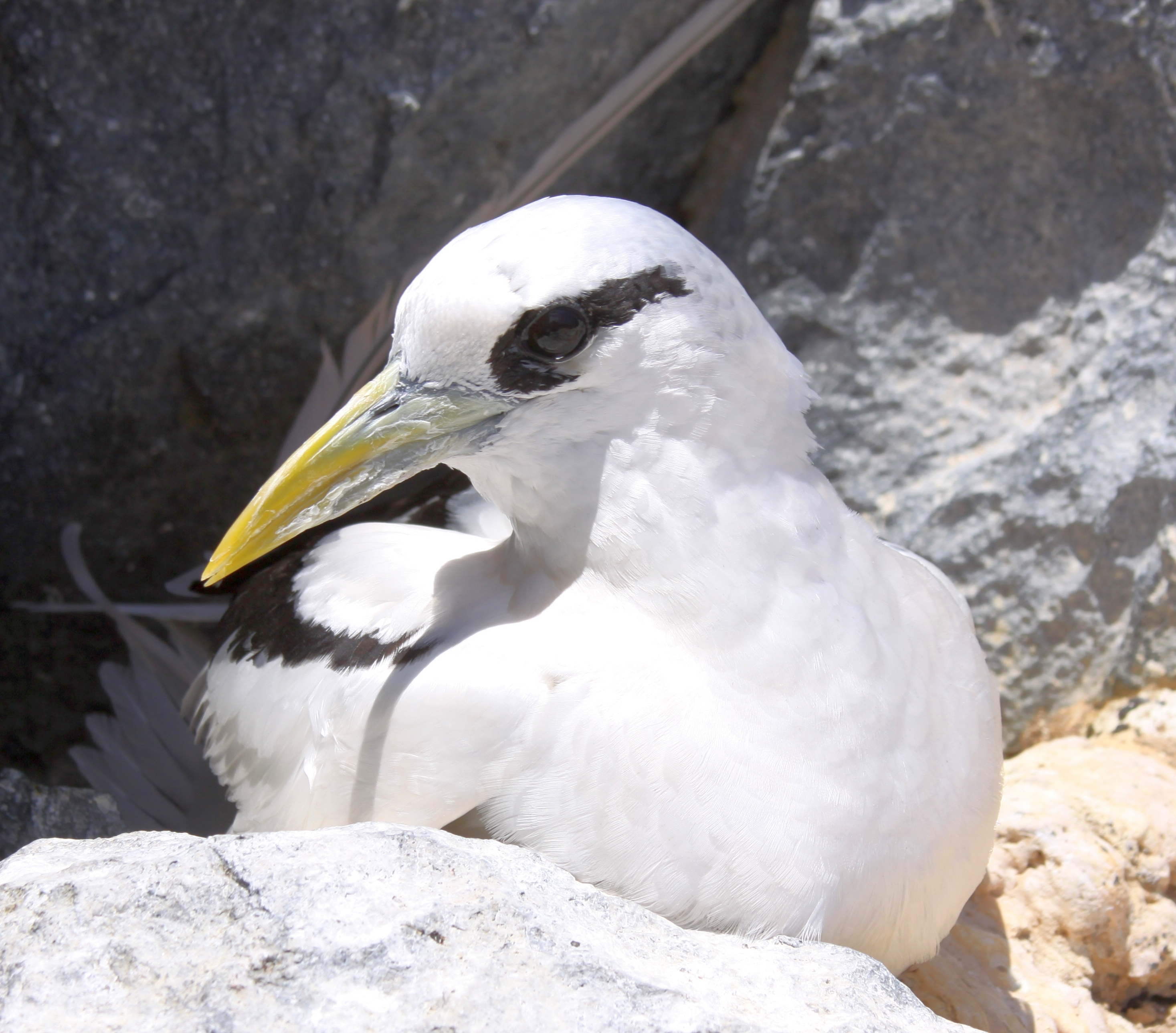
White-tailed tropicbird

Order: Phaethontiformes Family: Phaethontidae

Tropicbirds are slender white birds of tropical oceans, with exceptionally long central tail feathers. Their heads and long wings have black markings.

- White-tailed tropicbird, Phaethon lepturus (A)
- Red-billed tropicbird, Phaethon aethereus (A)

== Penguins ==
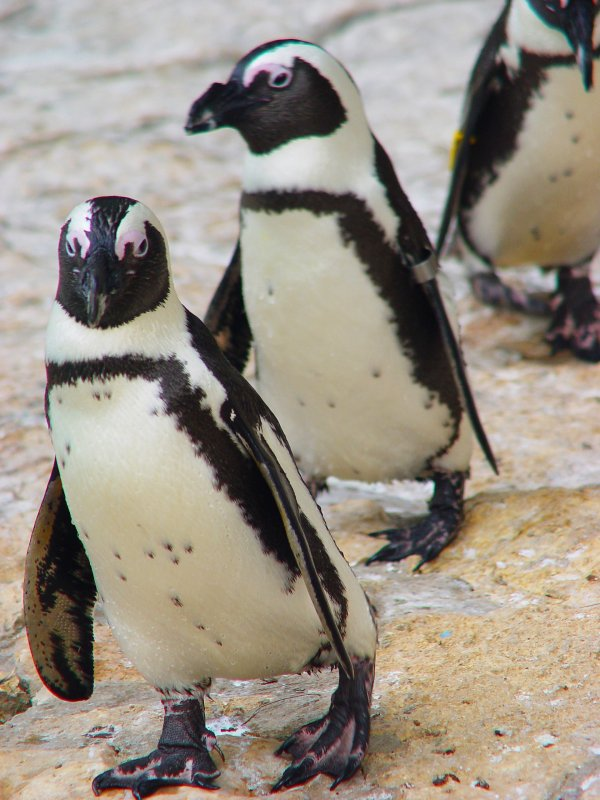
African penguin

Order: Sphenisciformes Family: Spheniscidae

The penguins are a group of aquatic, flightless birds living almost exclusively in the Southern Hemisphere. Most penguins feed on krill, fish, squid and other forms of sealife caught while swimming underwater.

- African penguin, Spheniscus demersus

== Albatrosses ==
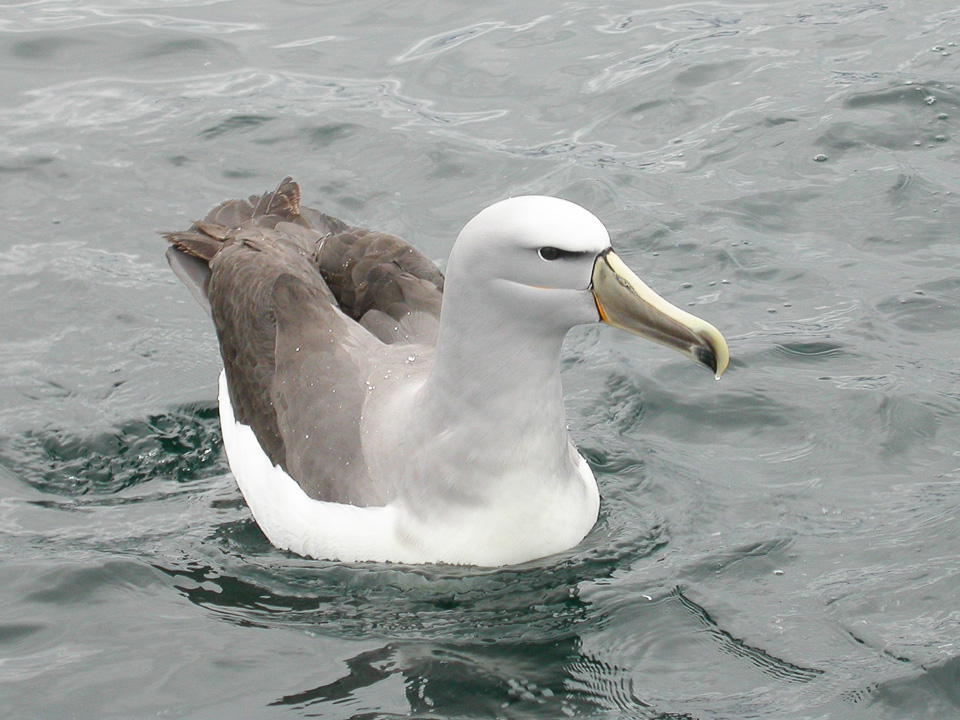
Salvin's albatross

Order: Procellariiformes Family: Diomedeidae

The albatrosses are among the largest of flying birds, and the great albatrosses from the genus Diomedea have the largest wingspans of any extant birds.

- Yellow-nosed albatross, Thalassarche chlororhynchos (A)
- Gray-headed albatross, Thalassarche chrysostoma (A)
- White-capped albatross, Thalassarche cauta (A)
- Salvin's albatross, Thalassarche salvini
- Black-browed albatross, Thalassarche melanophris (A)
- Royal albatross, Diomedea epomophora (A)
- Wandering albatross, Diomedea exulans

== Southern storm-petrels ==
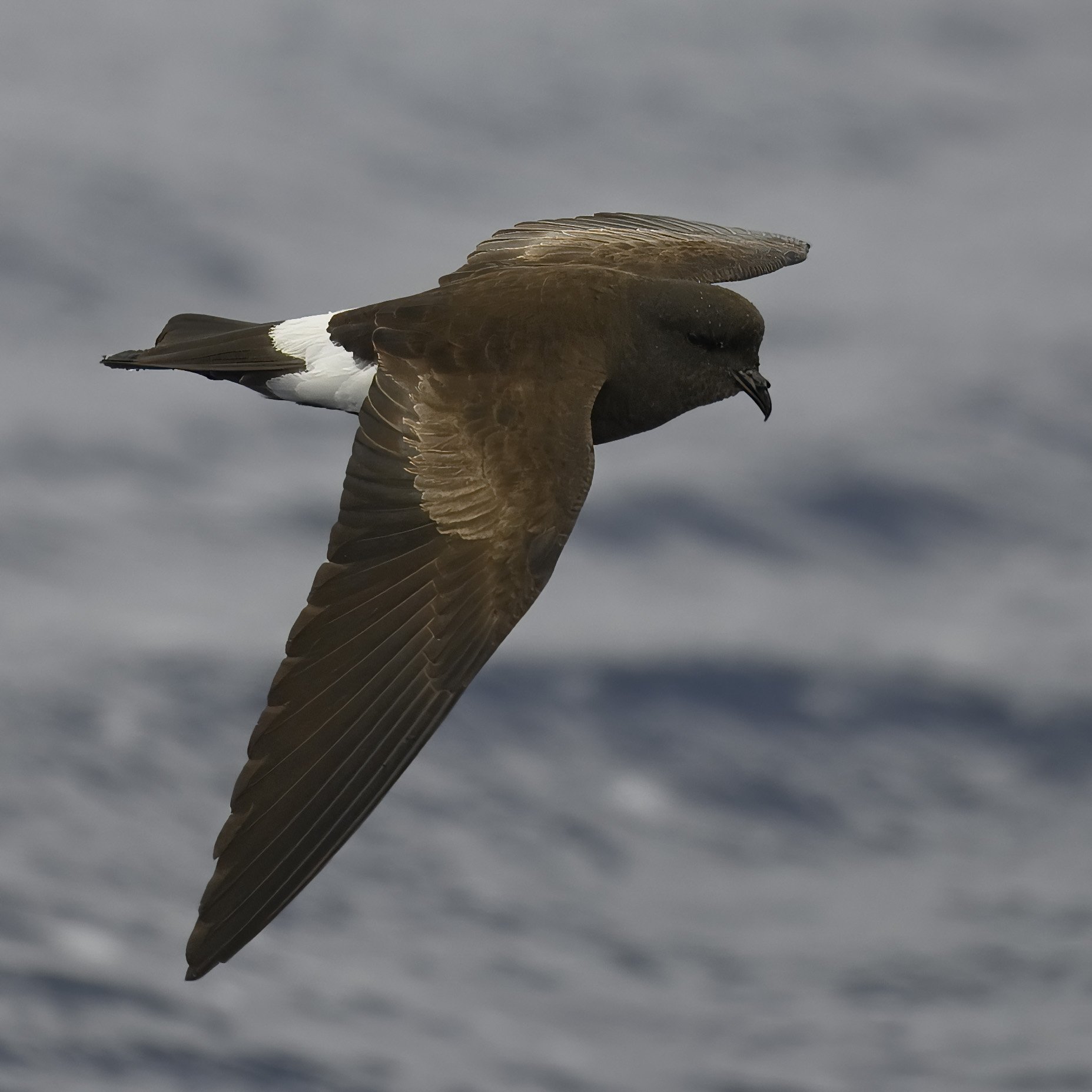
Wilson's storm-petrel

Order: Procellariiformes Family: Oceanitidae

The southern-storm petrels are relatives of the petrels and are the smallest seabirds. They feed on planktonic crustaceans and small fish picked from the surface, typically while hovering. The flight is fluttering and sometimes bat-like.

- Wilson's storm-petrel, Oceanites oceanicus

== Northern storm-petrels ==
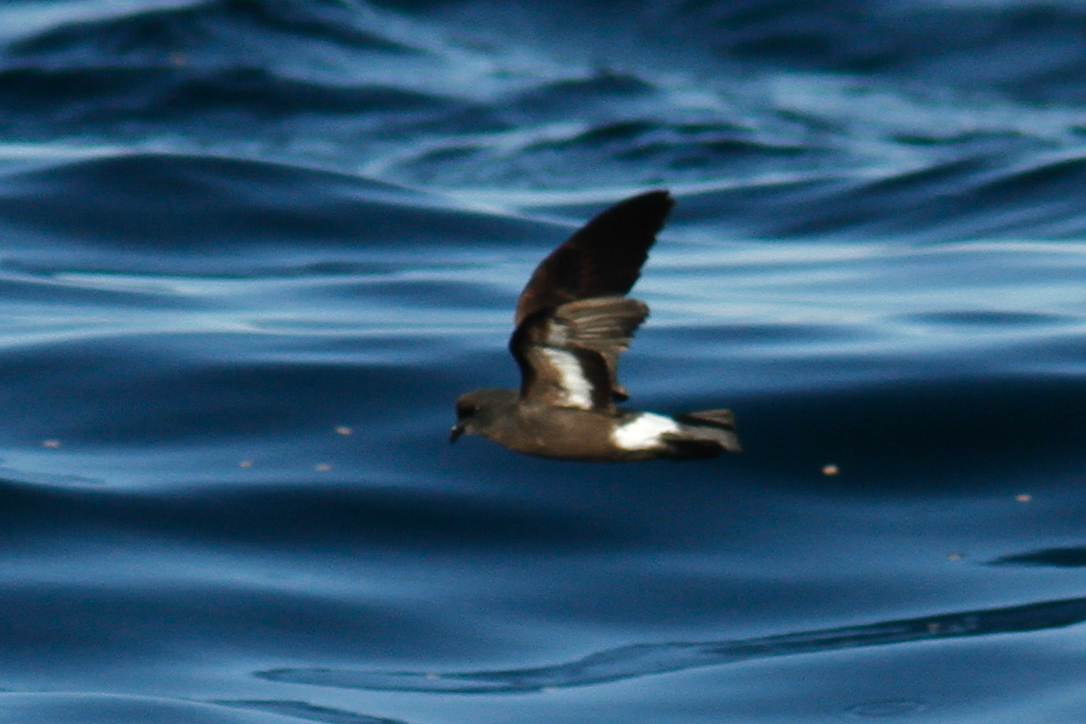
European storm-petrel

Order: Procellariiformes Family: Hydrobatidae

Though the members of this family are similar in many respects to the southern storm-petrels, including their general appearance and habits, there are enough genetic differences to warrant their placement in a separate family.

- European storm-petrel, Hydrobates pelagicus
- Leach's storm-petrel, Hydrobates leucorhous

== Shearwaters and petrels ==
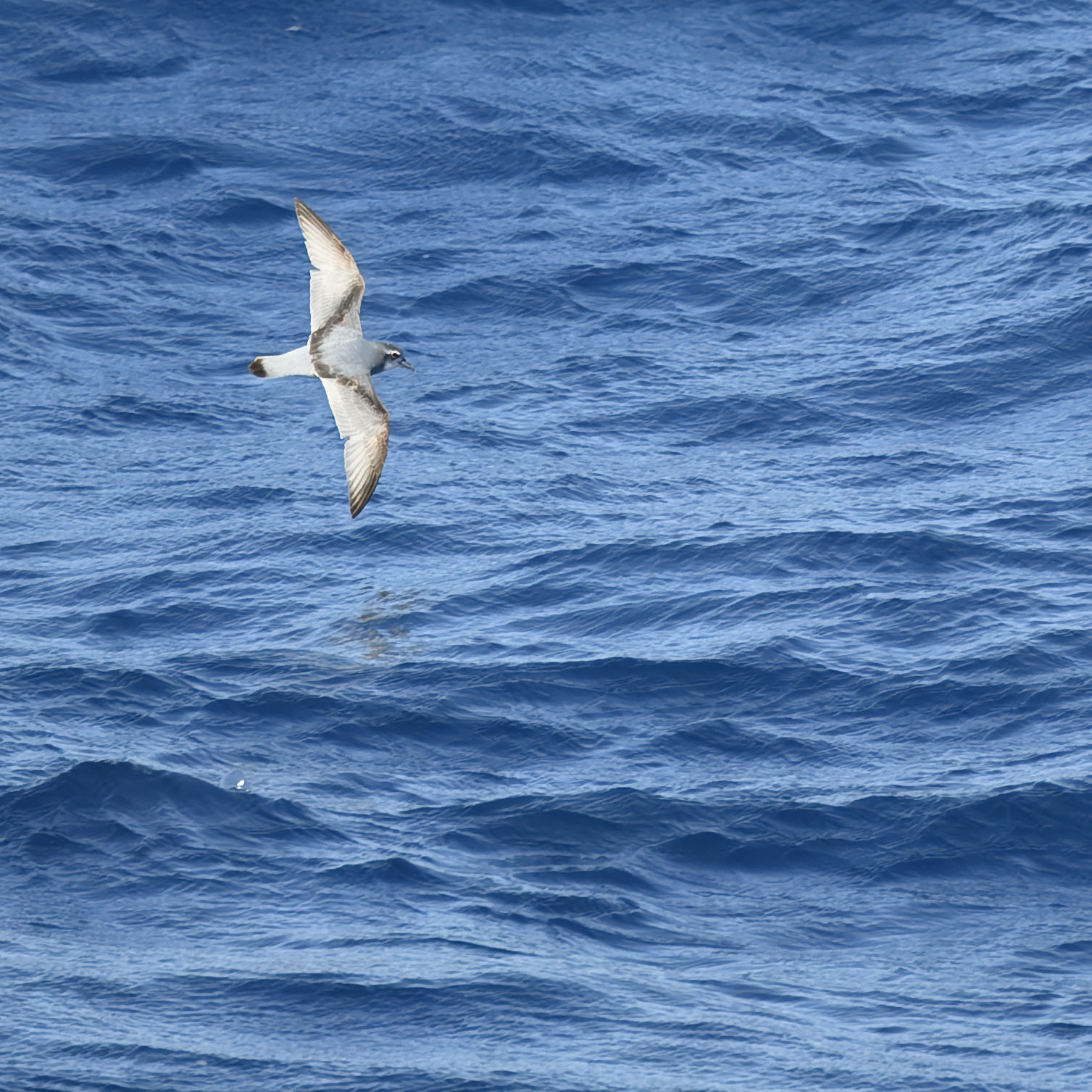
Antarctic prion

Order: Procellariiformes Family: Procellariidae

The procellariids are the main group of medium-sized "true petrels", characterised by united nostrils with medium septum and a long outer functional primary.

- Southern giant-petrel, Macronectes giganteus (A)
- Northern giant-petrel, Macronectes halli
- Cape petrel, Daption capense
- Great-winged petrel, Pterodroma macroptera (A)
- Soft-plumaged petrel, Pterodroma mollis (A)
- Antarctic prion, Pachyptila desolata
- White-chinned petrel, Procellaria aequinoctialis
- Cory's shearwater, Calonectris diomedea (A)
- Great shearwater, Ardenna gravis (A)
- Sooty shearwater, Ardenna griseus
- Manx shearwater, Puffinus puffinus (A)

== Storks ==
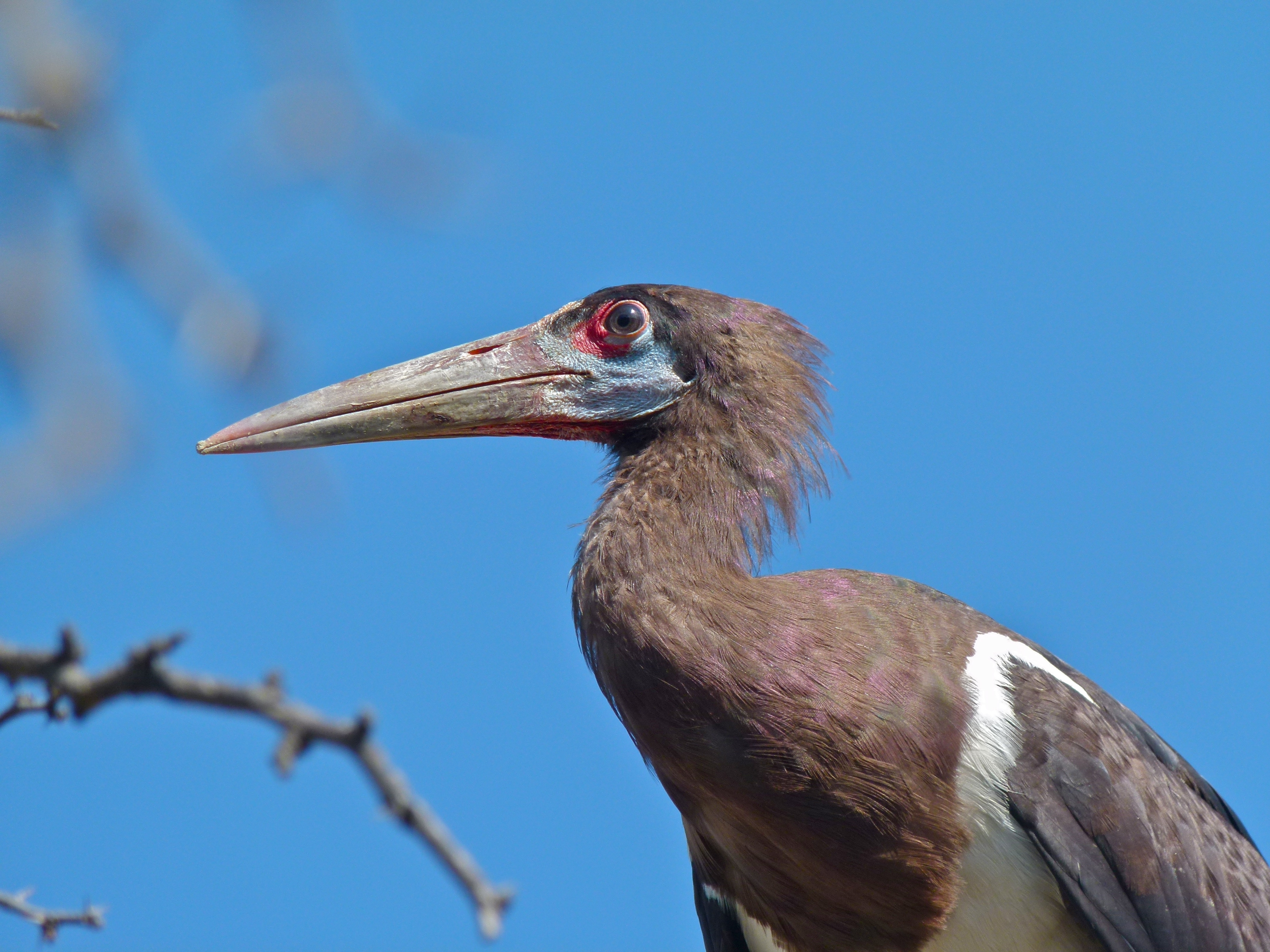
Abdim's stork

Order: Ciconiiformes Family: Ciconiidae

Storks are large, long-legged, long-necked, wading birds with long, stout bills. Storks are mute, but bill-clattering is an important mode of communication at the nest. Their nests can be large and may be reused for many years. Many species are migratory.

- African openbill, Anastomus lamelligerus
- Black stork, Ciconia nigra
- Abdim's stork, Ciconia abdimii
- African woolly-necked stork, Ciconia microscelis
- White stork, Ciconia ciconia
- Saddle-billed stork, Ephippiorhynchus senegalensis
- Marabou stork, Leptoptilos crumenifer
- Yellow-billed stork, Mycteria ibis

== Boobies and gannets ==
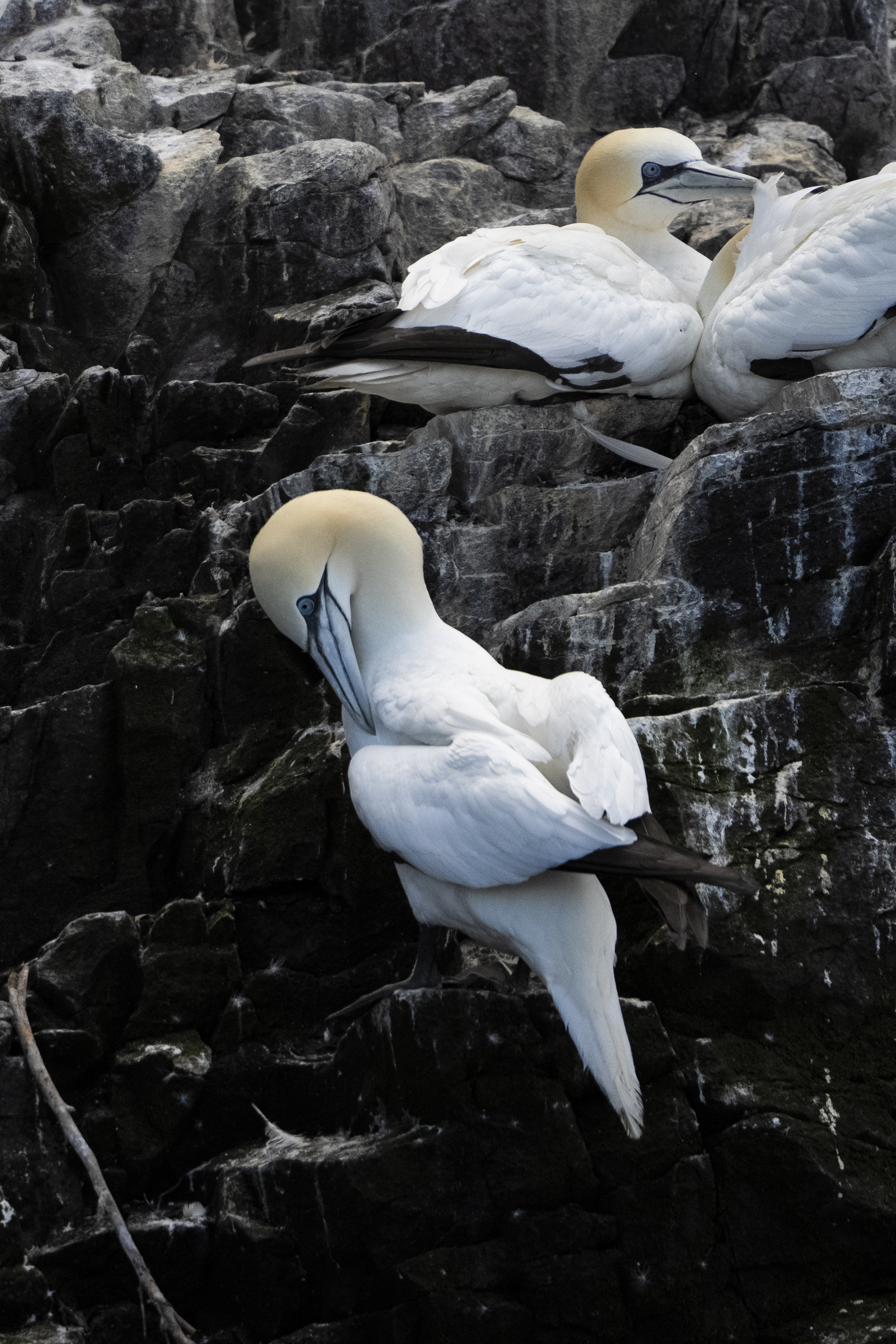
Northern gannet

Order: Suliformes Family: Sulidae

The sulids comprise the gannets and boobies. Both groups are medium to large coastal seabirds that plunge-dive for fish.

- Brown booby, Sula leucogaster (A)
- Northern gannet, Morus bassanus
- Cape gannet, Morus capensis

== Anhingas ==
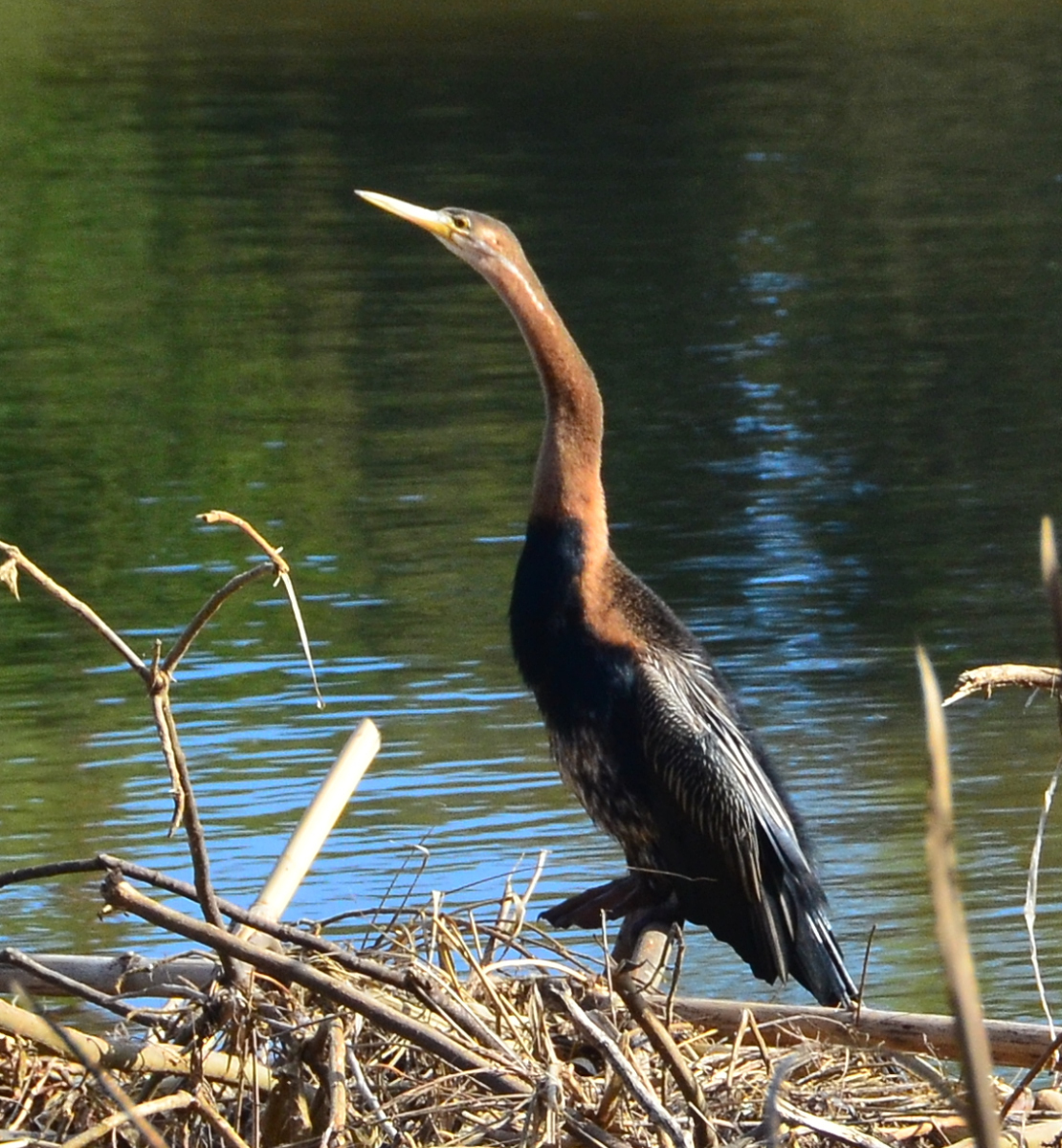
African darter

Order: Suliformes Family: Anhingidae

Anhingas or darters are often called "snake-birds" because of their long thin neck, which gives a snake-like appearance when they swim with their bodies submerged. The males have black and dark-brown plumage, an erectile crest on the nape and a larger bill than the female. The females have much paler plumage especially on the neck and underparts. The darters have completely webbed feet and their legs are short and set far back on the body. Their plumage is somewhat permeable, like that of cormorants, and they spread their wings to dry after diving.

- African darter, Anhinga rufa

== Cormorants and shags ==
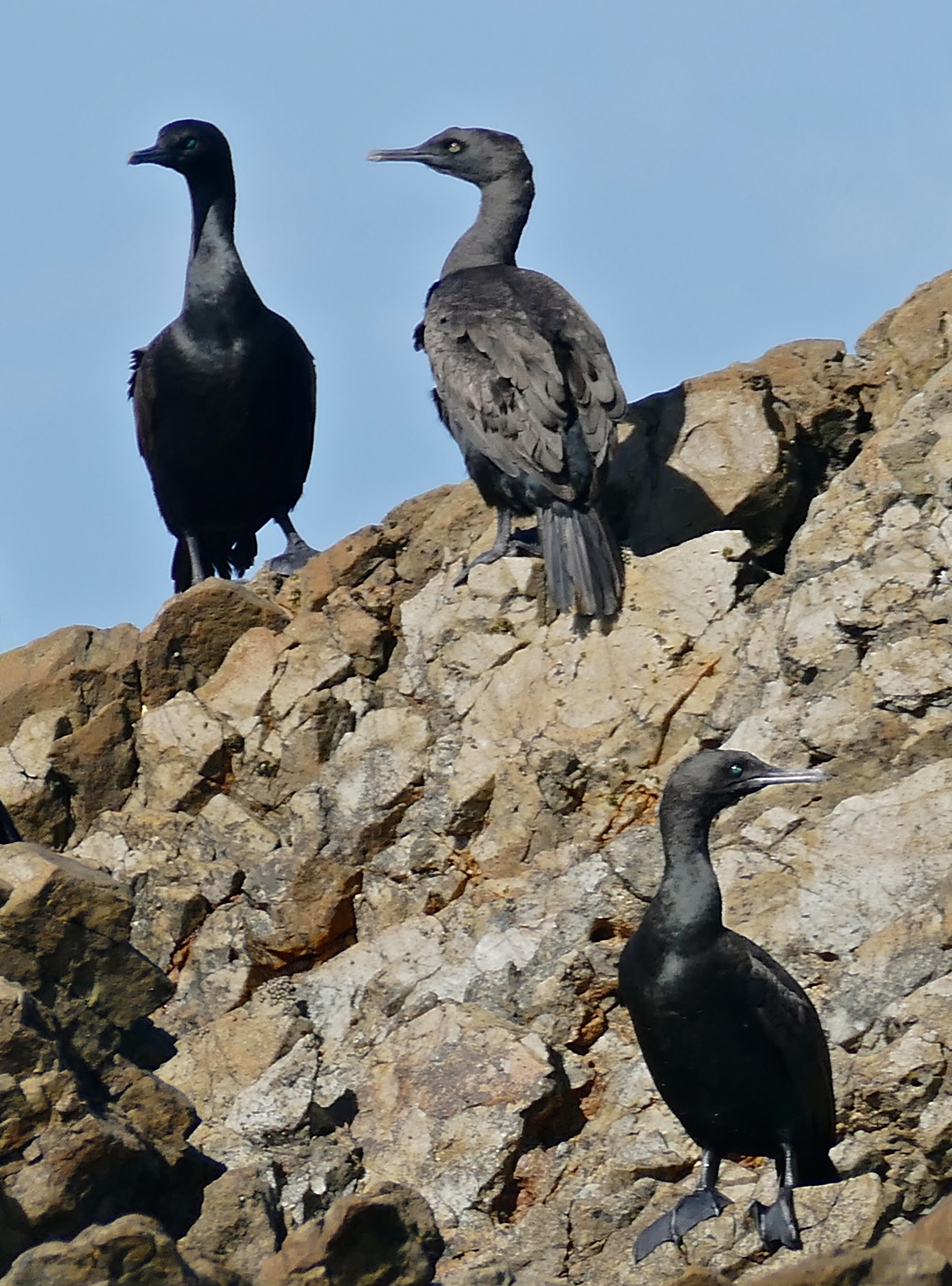
Bank cormorant

Order: Suliformes Family: Phalacrocoracidae

Phalacrocoracidae is a family of medium to large coastal, fish-eating seabirds that includes cormorants and shags. Plumage colouration varies, with the majority having mainly dark plumage, some species being black-and-white and a few being colourful.

- Long-tailed cormorant, Microcarbo africanus
- Crowned cormorant, Microcarbo coronatus
- Bank cormorant, Phalacrocorax neglectus
- Cape cormorant, Phalacrocorax capensis
- Great cormorant, Phalacrocorax carbo

== Pelicans ==
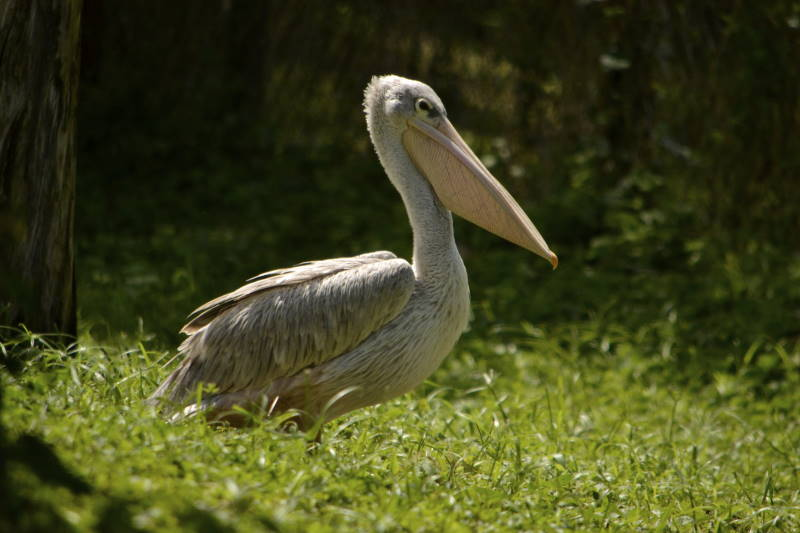
Pink-backed pelican

Order: Pelecaniformes Family: Pelecanidae

Pelicans are large water birds with a distinctive pouch under their beak. As with other members of the order Pelecaniformes, they have webbed feet with four toes.

- Great white pelican, Pelecanus onocrotalus
- Pink-backed pelican, Pelecanus rufescens

== Shoebill ==
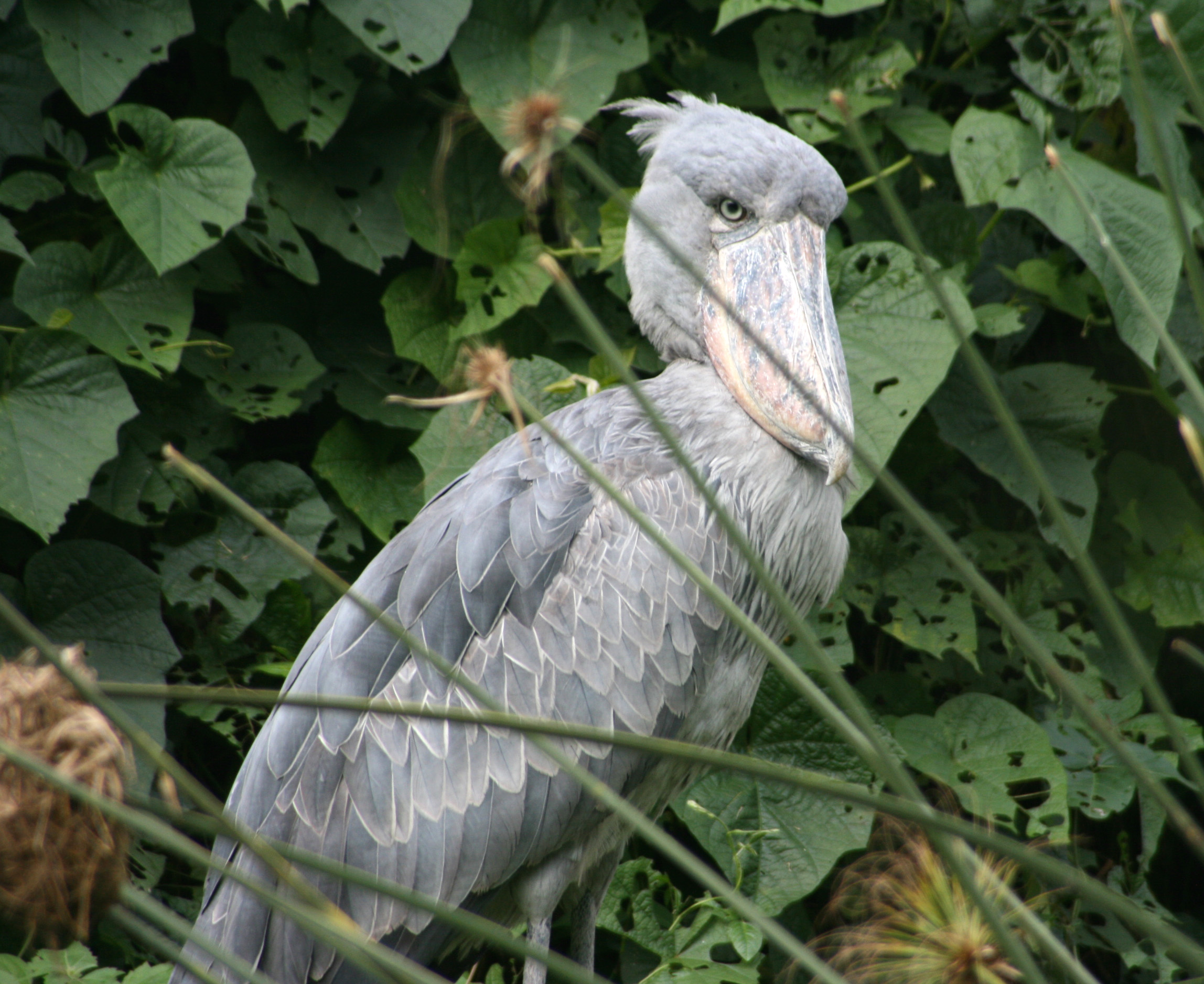
Shoebill

Order: Pelecaniformes Family: Balaenicipididae

The shoebill is a large bird related to the storks. It derives its name from its massive shoe-shaped bill.

- Shoebill, Balaeniceps rex

== Hammerkop ==
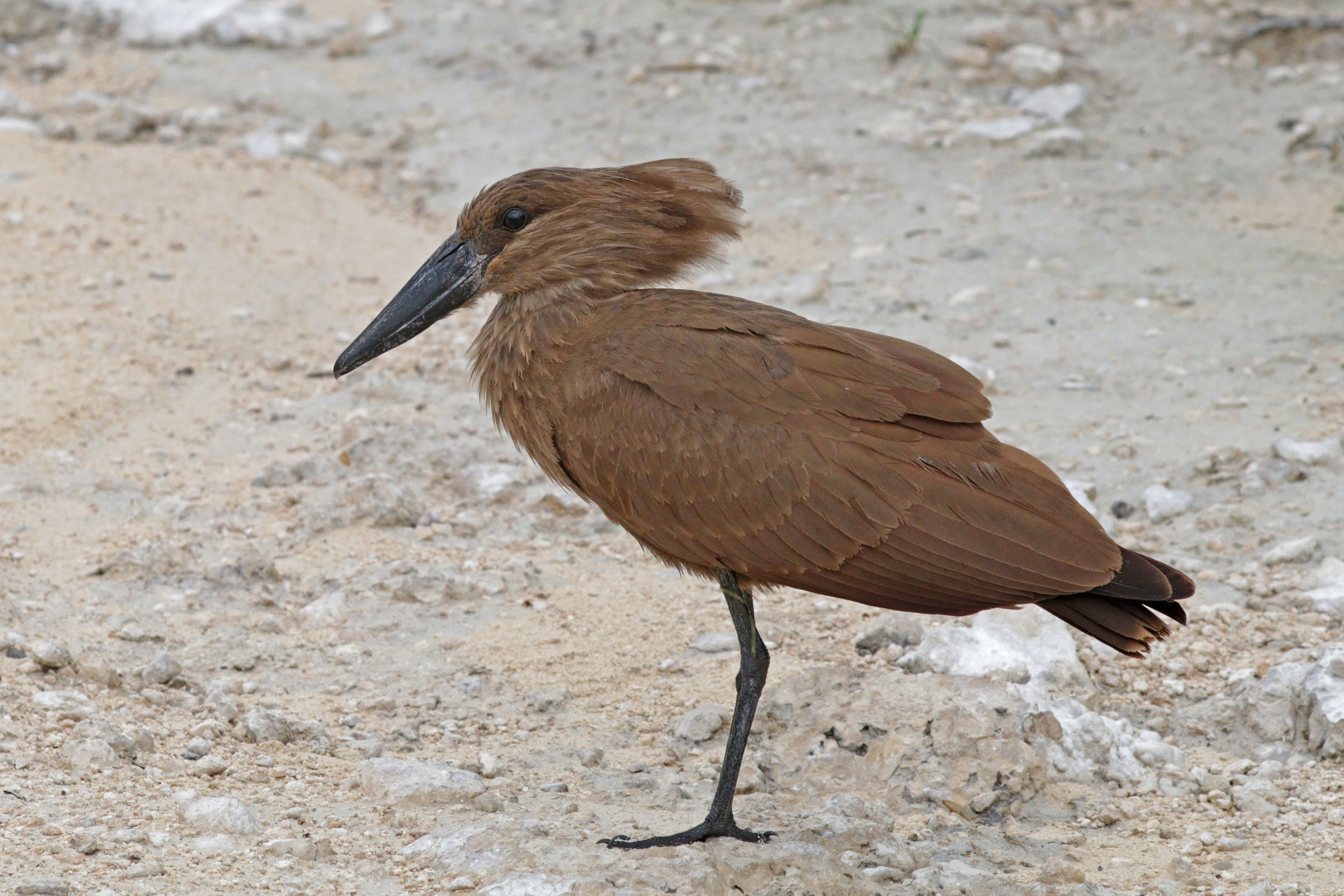
Hamerkop

Order: Pelecaniformes Family: Scopidae

The hammerkop is a medium-sized bird with a long shaggy crest. The shape of its head with a curved bill and crest at the back is reminiscent of a hammer, hence its name. Its plumage is drab-brown all over.

- Hamerkop, Scopus umbretta

== Herons, egrets, and bitterns ==
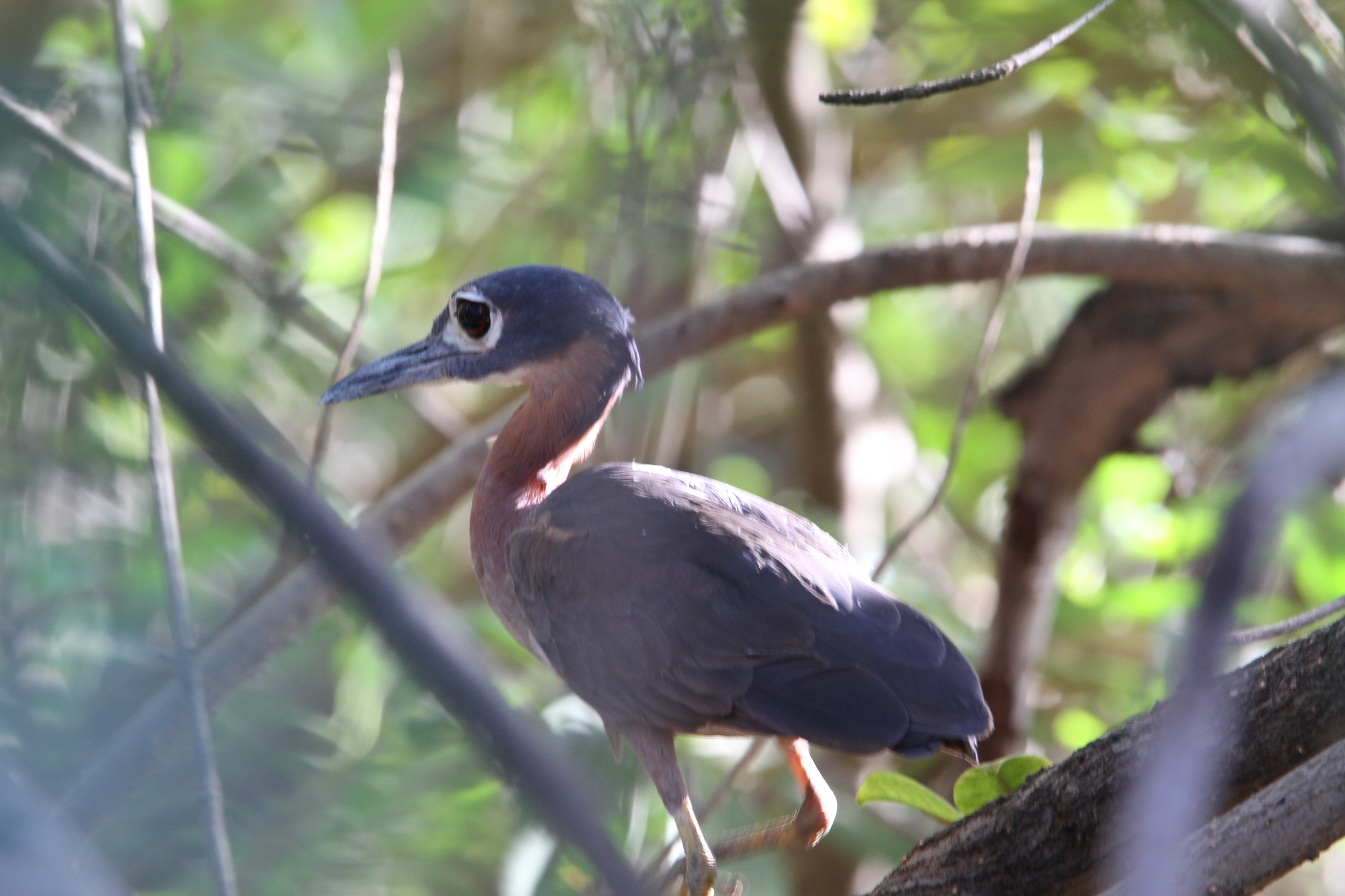
White-backed night-heron

Order: Pelecaniformes Family: Ardeidae

The family Ardeidae contains the bitterns, herons and egrets. Herons and egrets are medium to large wading birds with long necks and legs. Bitterns tend to be shorter necked and more wary. Members of Ardeidae fly with their necks retracted, unlike other long-necked birds such as storks, ibises and spoonbills.

- Great bittern, Botaurus stellaris
- Little bittern, Ixobrychus minutus
- Dwarf bittern, Ixobrychus sturmii
- White-crested bittern, Tigriornis leucolophus
- Gray heron, Ardea cinerea
- Black-headed heron, Ardea melanocephala
- Goliath heron, Ardea goliath
- Purple heron, Ardea purpurea
- Great egret, Ardea alba
- Intermediate egret, Ardea intermedia
- Little egret, Egretta garzetta
- Slaty egret, Egretta vinaceigula (A)
- Black heron, Egretta ardesiaca
- Cattle egret, Bubulcus ibis
- Squacco heron, Ardeola ralloides
- Malagasy pond-heron, Ardeola idae (A)
- Rufous-bellied heron, Ardeola rufiventris
- Striated heron, Butorides striata
- Black-crowned night-heron, Nycticorax nycticorax
- White-backed night-heron, Gorsachius leuconotus

== Ibises and spoonbills ==
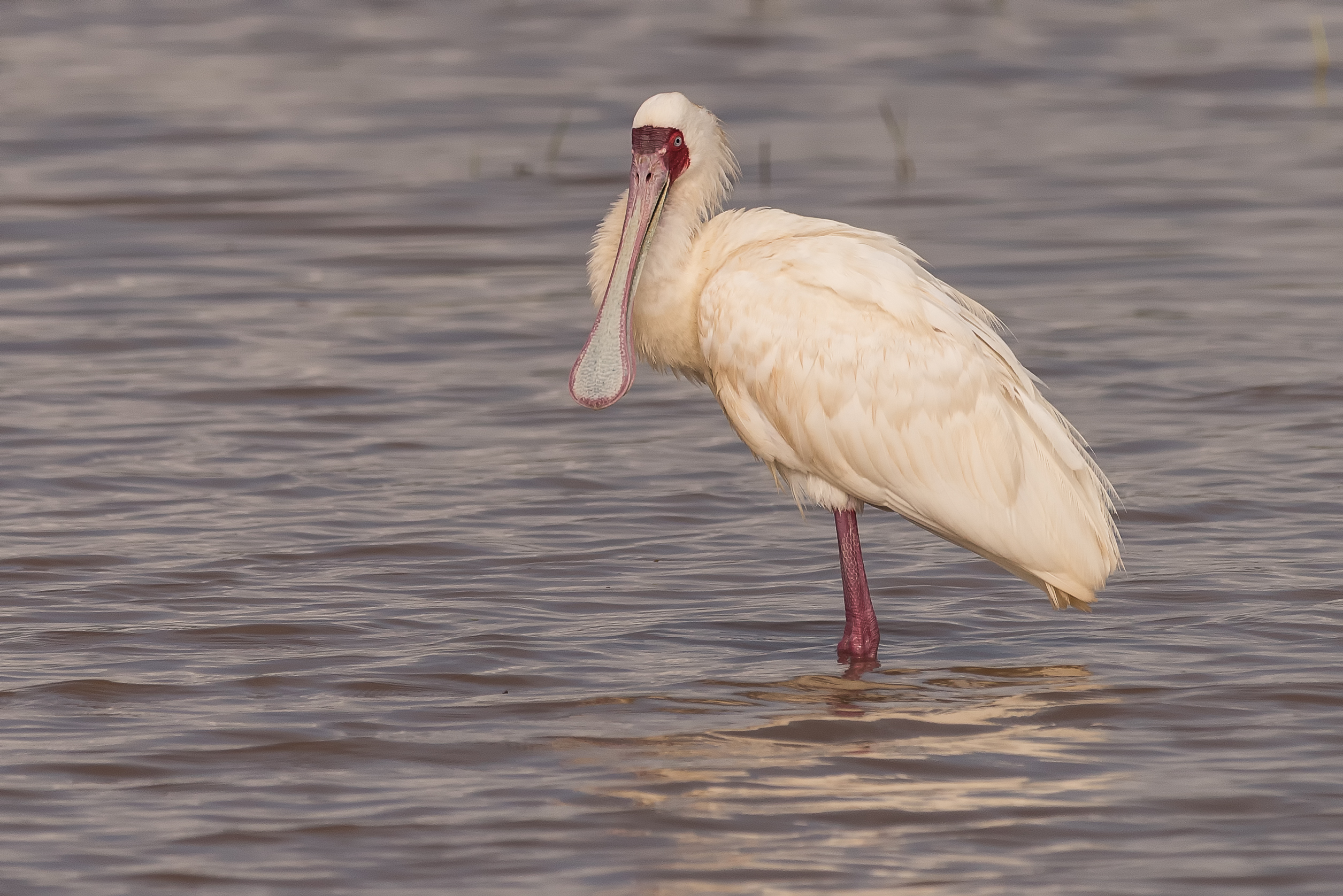
African spoonbill

Order: Pelecaniformes Family: Threskiornithidae

Threskiornithidae is a family of large terrestrial and wading birds which includes the ibises and spoonbills. They have long, broad wings with 11 primary and about 20 secondary feathers. They are strong fliers and despite their size and weight, very capable soarers.

- Glossy ibis, Plegadis falcinellus
- African sacred ibis, Threskiornis aethiopicus
- Spot-breasted ibis, Bostrychia rara
- Hadada ibis, Bostrychia hagedash
- African spoonbill, Platalea alba

== Secretarybird ==
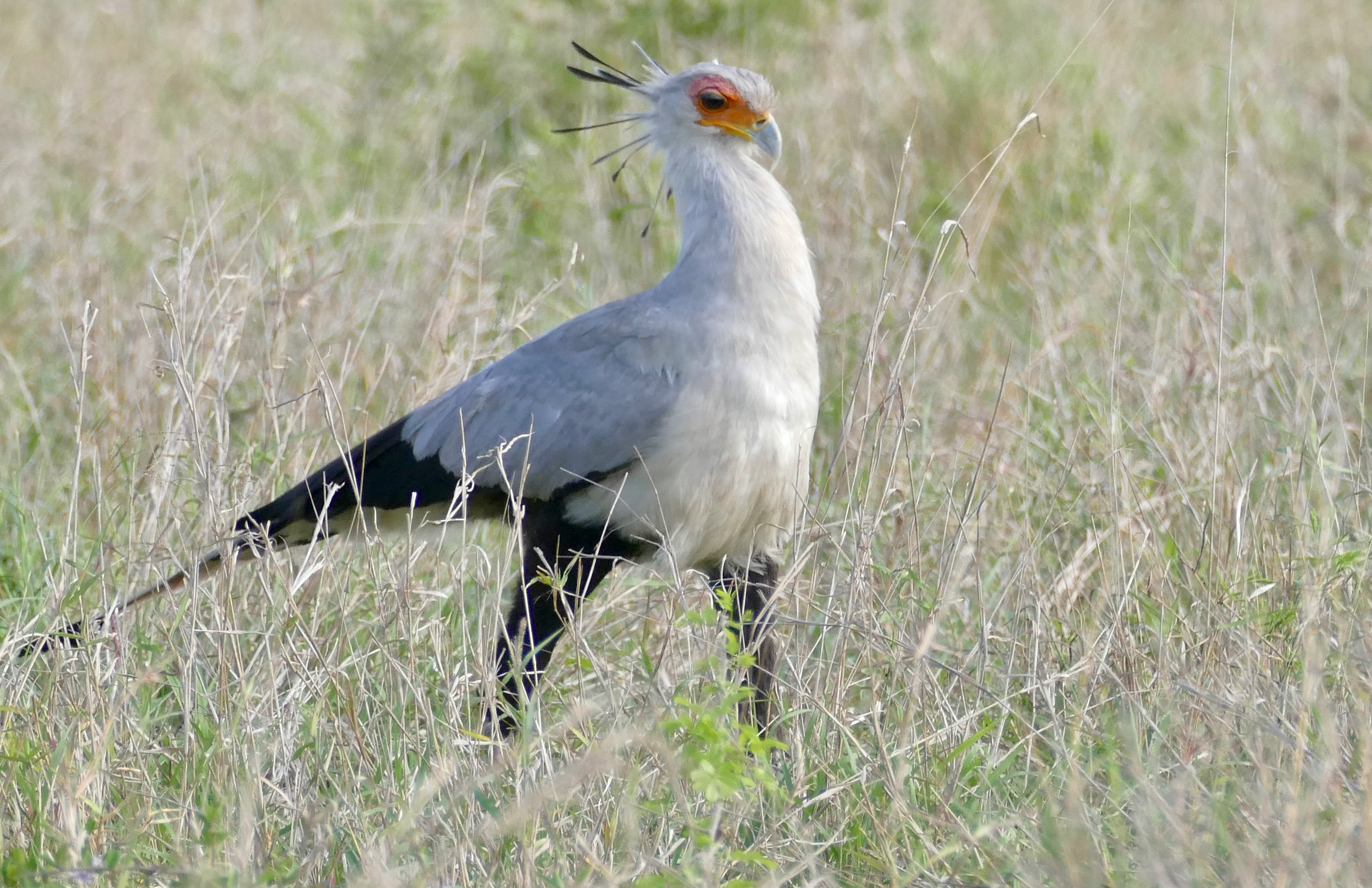
Secretarybird

Order: Accipitriformes Family: Sagittariidae

The secretarybird is a bird of prey in the order Falconiformes but is easily distinguished from other raptors by its long crane-like legs.

- Secretarybird, Sagittarius serpentarius

== Osprey ==
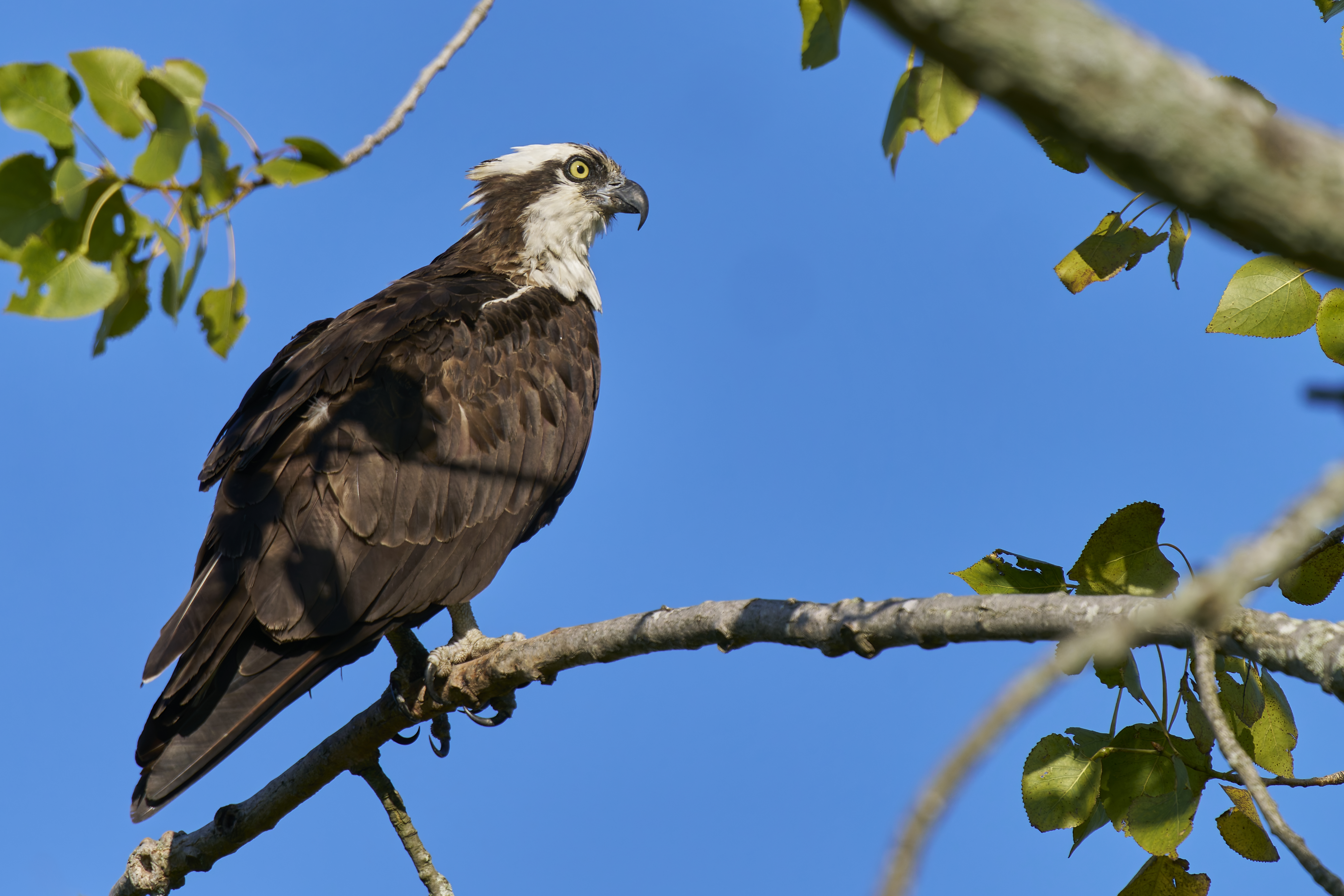
Osprey

Order: Accipitriformes Family: Pandionidae

The family Pandionidae contains only one species, the osprey. The osprey is a medium-large raptor which is a specialist fish-eater with a worldwide distribution.

- Osprey, Pandion haliaetus

== Hawks, eagles, and kites ==
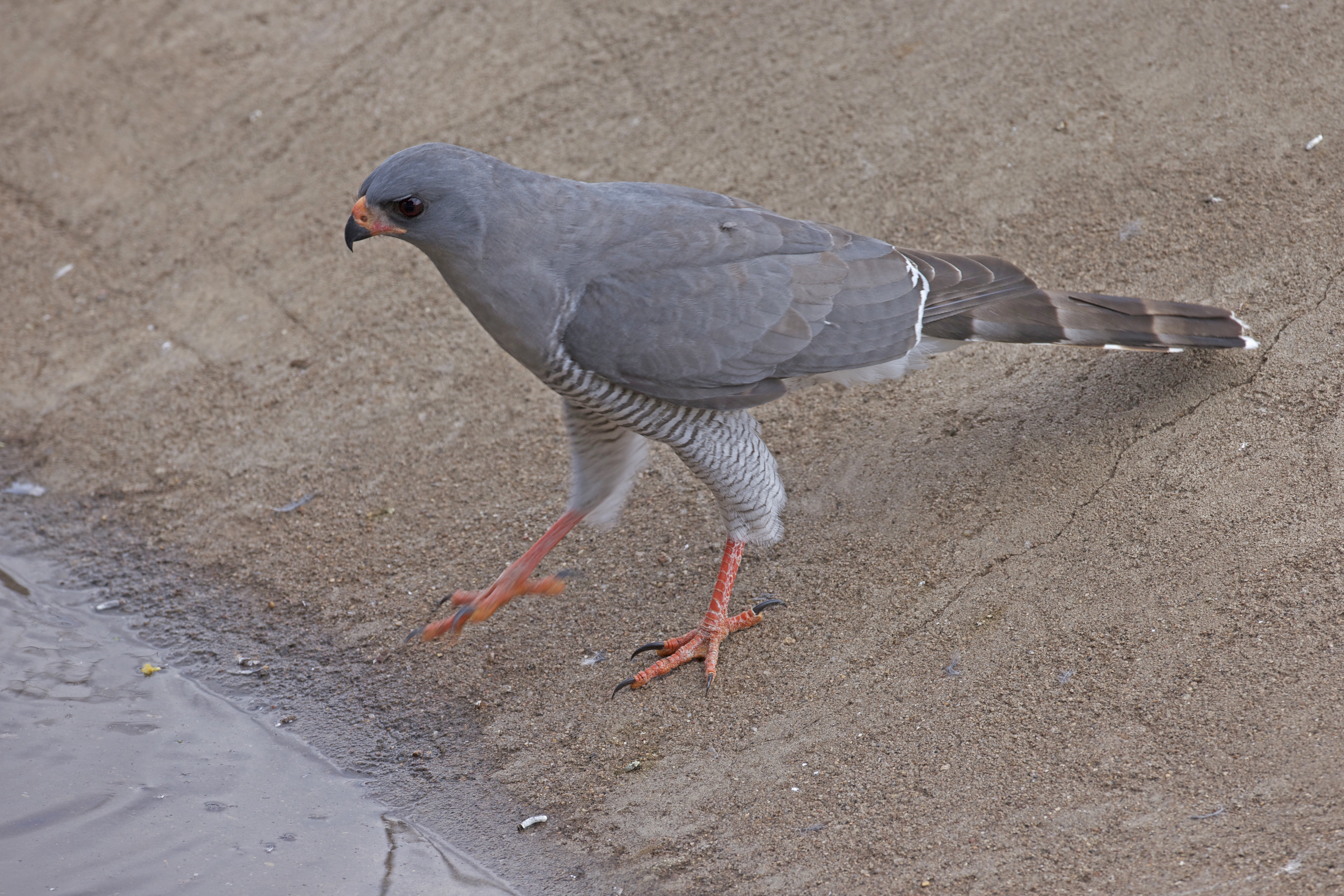
Gabar goshawk

Order: Accipitriformes Family: Accipitridae

Accipitridae is a family of birds of prey, which includes hawks, eagles, kites, harriers and Old World vultures. These birds have powerful hooked beaks for tearing flesh from their prey, strong legs, powerful talons and keen eyesight.

- Black-winged kite, Elanus caeruleus
- African harrier-hawk, Polyboroides typus
- Palm-nut vulture, Gypohierax angolensis
- Egyptian vulture, Neophron percnopterus
- European honey-buzzard, Pernis apivorus
- African cuckoo-hawk, Aviceda cuculoides
- White-headed vulture, Trigonoceps occipitalis
- Lappet-faced vulture, Torgos tracheliotos
- Hooded vulture, Necrosyrtes monachus
- White-backed vulture, Gyps africanus
- Bateleur, Terathopius ecaudatus
- Congo serpent-eagle, Dryotriorchis spectabilis
- Black-chested snake-eagle, Circaetus pectoralis
- Brown snake-eagle, Circaetus cinereus
- Banded snake-eagle, Circaetus cinerascens
- Bat hawk, Macheiramphus alcinus
- Crowned eagle, Stephanoaetus coronatus
- Martial eagle, Polemaetus bellicosus
- Long-crested eagle, Lophaetus occipitalis
- Lesser spotted eagle, Clanga pomarina
- Wahlberg's eagle, Hieraaetus wahlbergi
- Booted eagle, Hieraaetus pennatus (A)
- Ayres's hawk-eagle, Hieraaetus ayresii
- Tawny eagle, Aquila rapax
- Steppe eagle, Aquila nipalensis (A)
- Cassin's hawk-eagle, Aquila africana
- Verreaux's eagle, Aquila verreauxii
- African hawk-eagle, Aquila spilogaster
- Lizard buzzard, Kaupifalco monogrammicus
- Dark chanting-goshawk, Melierax metabates
- Pale chanting-goshawk, Melierax canorus
- Gabar goshawk, Micronisus gabar
- Eurasian marsh-harrier, Circus aeruginosus
- African marsh-harrier, Circus ranivorus
- Pallid harrier, Circus macrourus
- Montagu's harrier, Circus pygargus
- African goshawk, Accipiter tachiro
- Chestnut-flanked sparrowhawk, Accipiter castanilius
- Shikra, Accipiter badius
- Little sparrowhawk, Accipiter minullus
- Ovambo sparrowhawk, Accipiter ovampensis
- Rufous-breasted sparrowhawk, Accipiter rufiventris
- Black goshawk, Accipiter melanoleucus
- Long-tailed hawk, Urotriorchis macrourus
- Black kite, Milvus migrans
- African fish-eagle, Haliaeetus vocifer
- Common buzzard, Buteo buteo
- Red-necked buzzard, Buteo auguralis
- Augur buzzard, Buteo augur

== Barn-owls ==
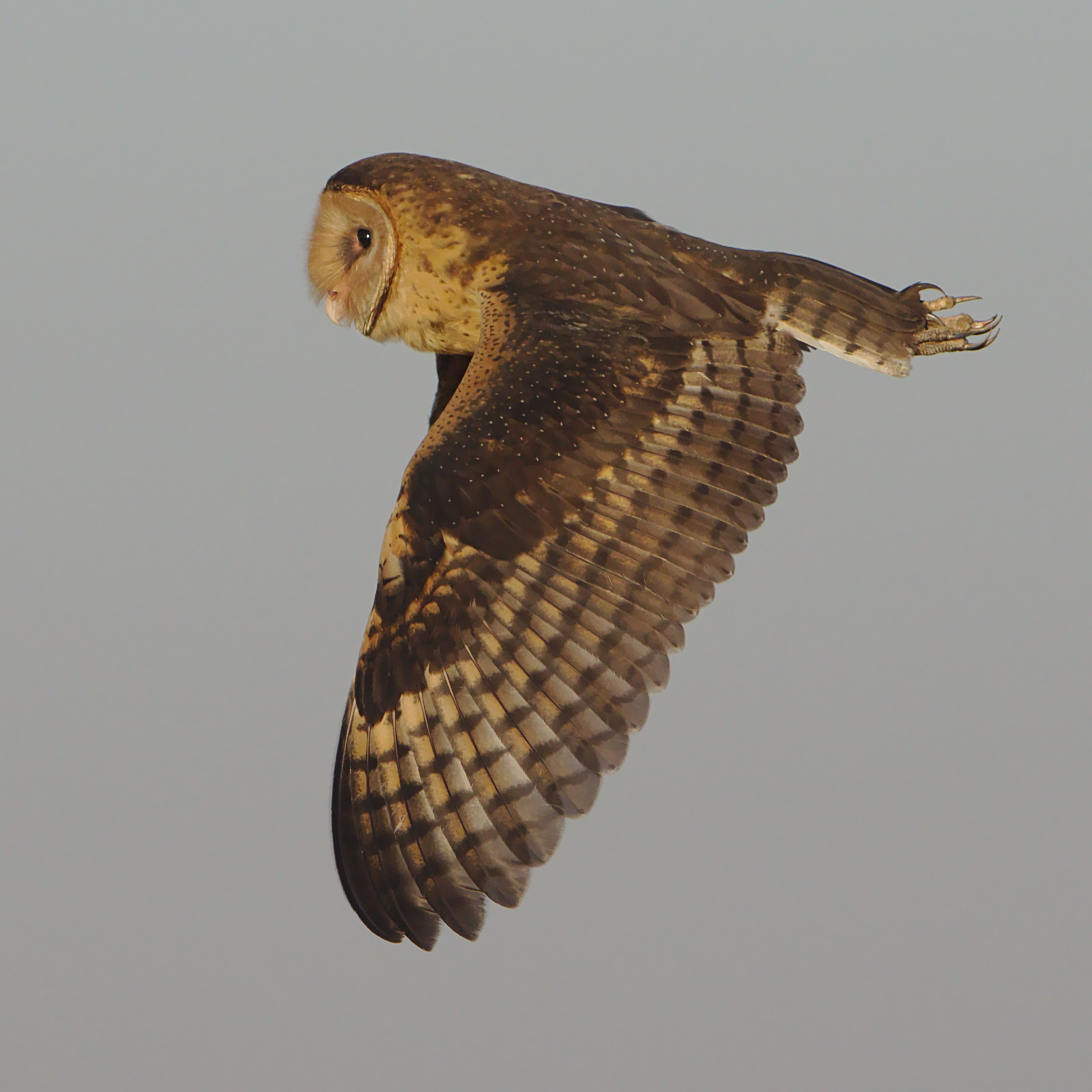
African grass-owl

Order: Strigiformes Family: Tytonidae

Barn-owls are medium to large owls with large heads and characteristic heart-shaped faces. They have long strong legs with powerful talons.

- African grass-owl, Tyto capensis
- Western barn owl, Tyto alba

== Owls ==
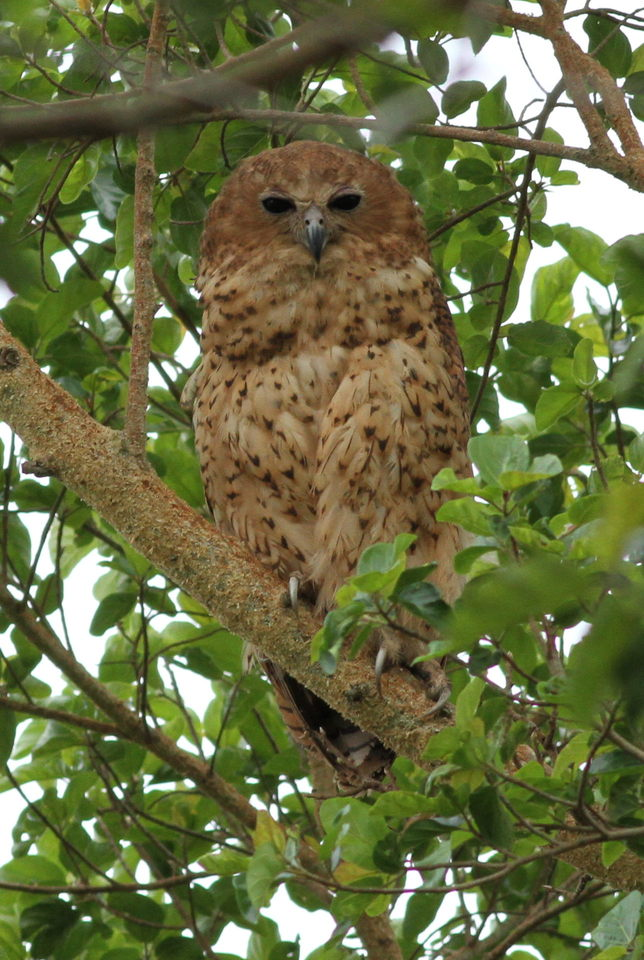
Pel's fishing-owl

Order: Strigiformes Family: Strigidae

The typical owls are small to large solitary nocturnal birds of prey. They have large forward-facing eyes and ears, a hawk-like beak and a conspicuous circle of feathers around each eye called a facial disk.

- Eurasian scops-owl, Otus scops
- African scops-owl, Otus senegalensis
- Southern white-faced owl, Ptilopsis granti
- Spotted eagle-owl, Bubo africanus
- Fraser's eagle-owl, Bubo poensis
- Shelley's eagle-owl, Bubo shelleyi
- Verreaux's eagle-owl, Bubo lacteus
- Akun eagle-owl, Bubo leucostictus
- Pel's fishing-owl, Scotopelia peli
- Vermiculated fishing-owl, Scotopelia bouvieri
- Pearl-spotted owlet, Glaucidium perlatum
- African barred owlet, Glaucidium capense
- African wood-owl, Strix woodfordii
- Marsh owl, Asio capensis

== Mousebirds ==
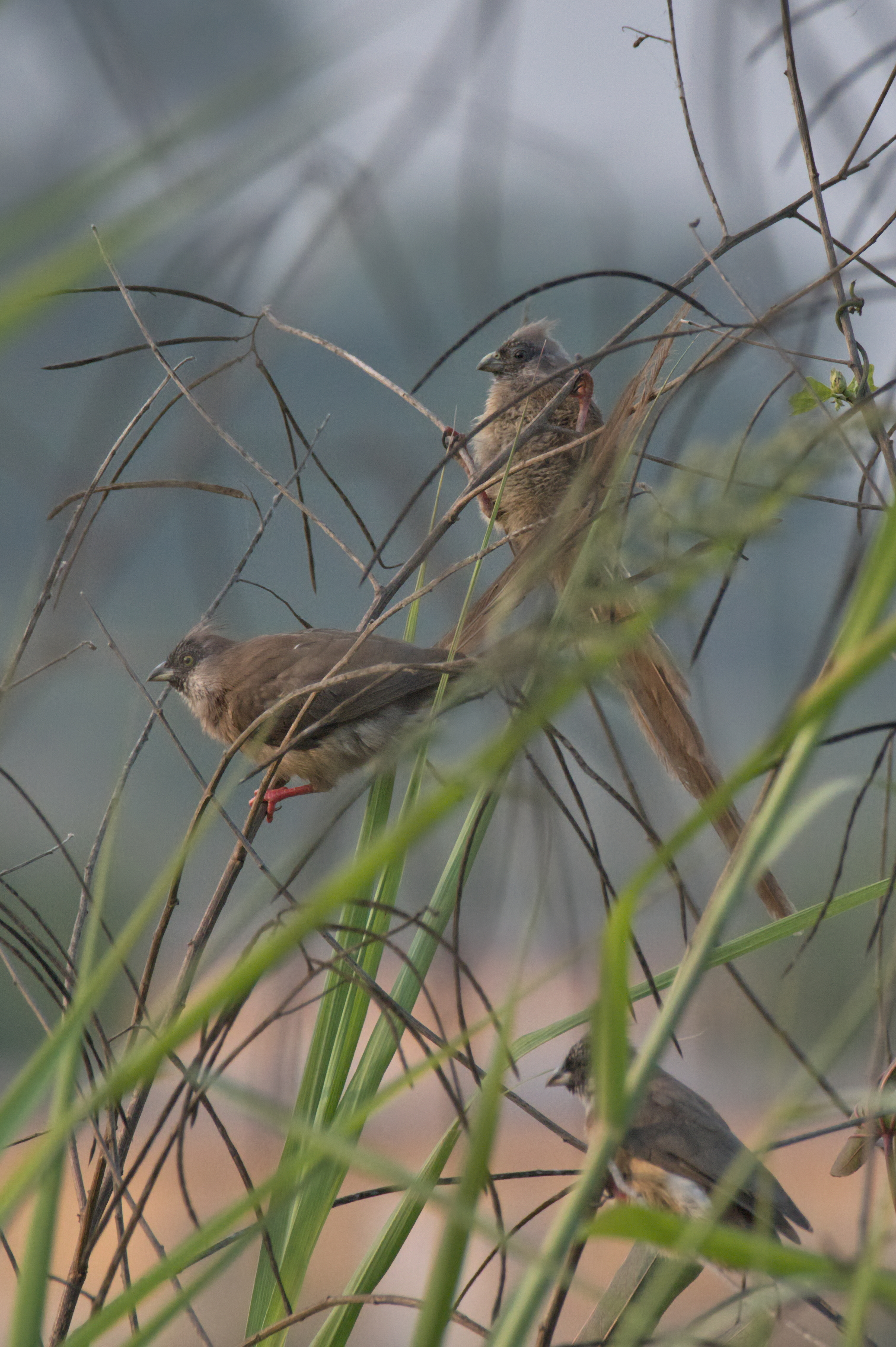
Red-backed mousebird

Order: Coliiformes Family: Coliidae

The mousebirds are slender greyish or brown birds with soft, hairlike body feathers and very long thin tails. They are arboreal and scurry through the leaves like rodents in search of berries, fruit and buds. They are acrobatic and can feed upside down. All species have strong claws and reversible outer toes. They also have crests and stubby bills.

- Speckled mousebird, Colius striatus
- Red-backed mousebird, Colius castanotus (E)
- Red-faced mousebird, Urocolius indicus

== Trogons ==
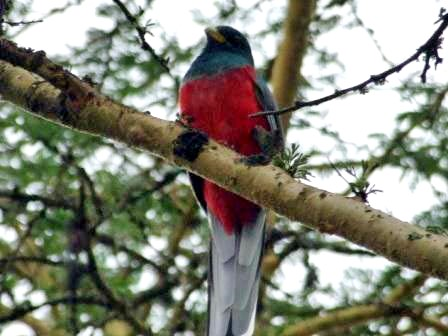
Narina trogon

Order: Trogoniformes Family: Trogonidae

The family Trogonidae includes trogons and quetzals. Found in tropical woodlands worldwide, they feed on insects and fruit, and their broad bills and weak legs reflect their diet and arboreal habits. Although their flight is fast, they are reluctant to fly any distance. Trogons have soft, often colourful, feathers with distinctive male and female plumage.

- Narina trogon, Apaloderma narina
- Bar-tailed trogon, Apaloderma vittatum

== Hoopoes ==
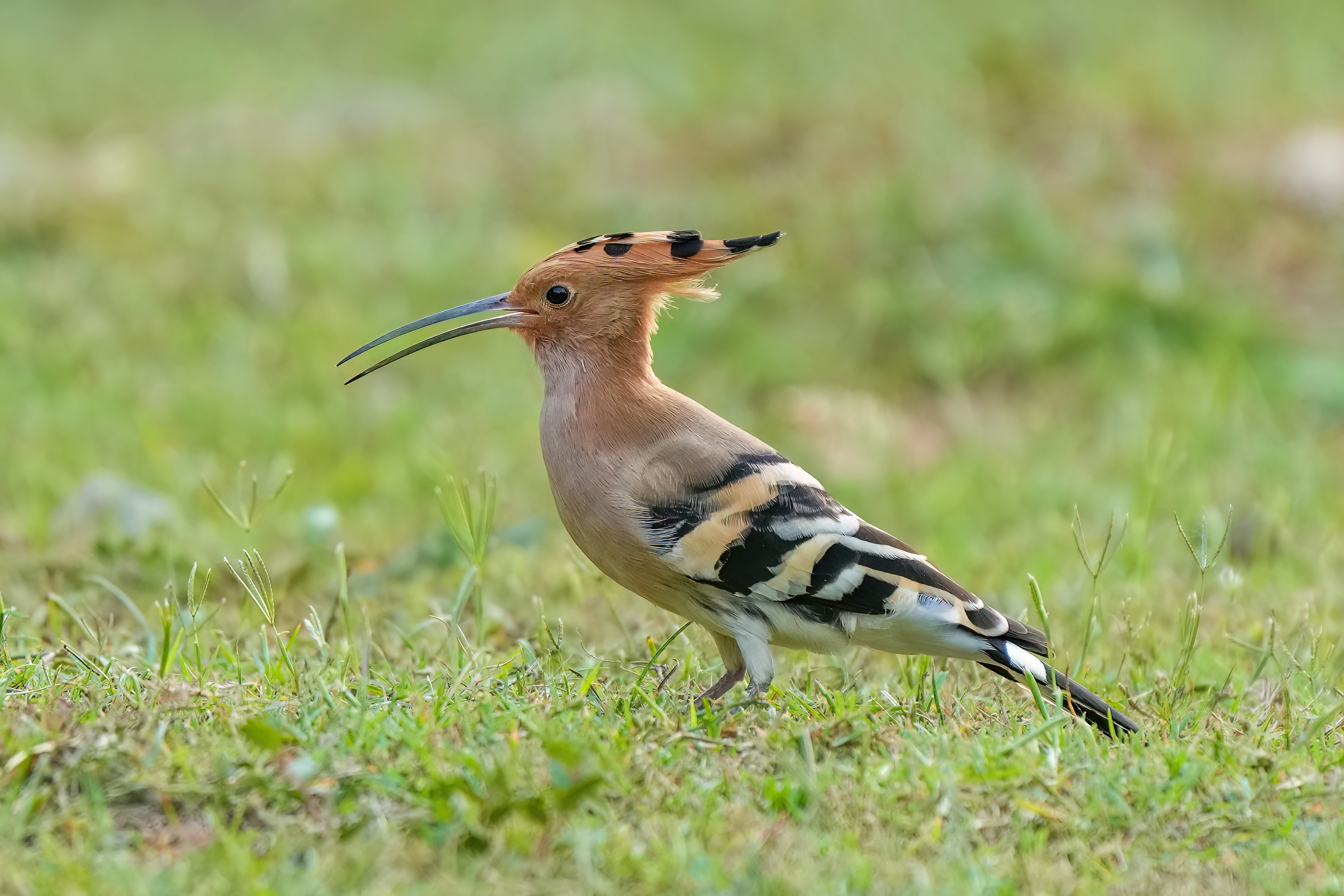
Eurasian hoopoe

Order: Bucerotiformes Family: Upupidae

Hoopoes have black, white and orangey-pink colouring with a large erectile crest on their head.

- Eurasian hoopoe, Upupa epops

== Woodhoopoes and scimitarbills ==
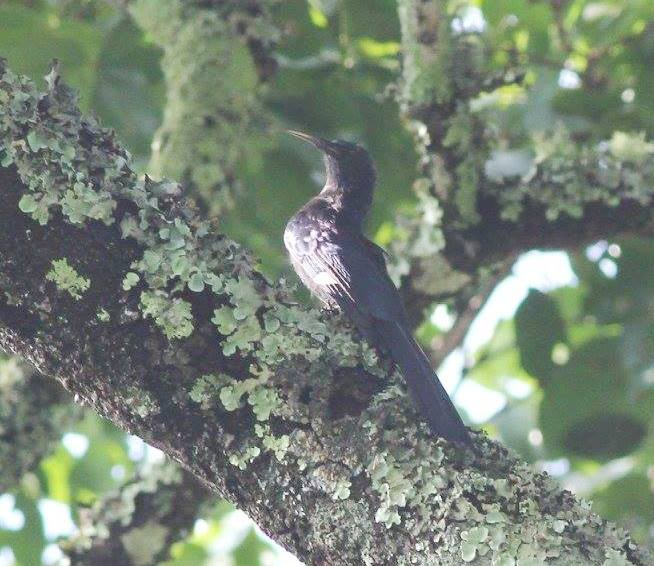
Black scimitarbill

Order: Bucerotiformes Family: Phoeniculidae

The woodhoopoes are related to the kingfishers, rollers and hoopoes. They most resemble the hoopoes with their long curved bills, used to probe for insects, and short rounded wings. However, they differ in that they have metallic plumage, often blue, green or purple, and lack an erectile crest.

- Green woodhoopoe, Phoeniculus purpureus
- Violet woodhoopoe, Phoeniculus damarensis
- Black scimitarbill, Rhinopomastus aterrimus
- Common scimitarbill, Rhinopomastus cyanomelas

== Ground-hornbills ==
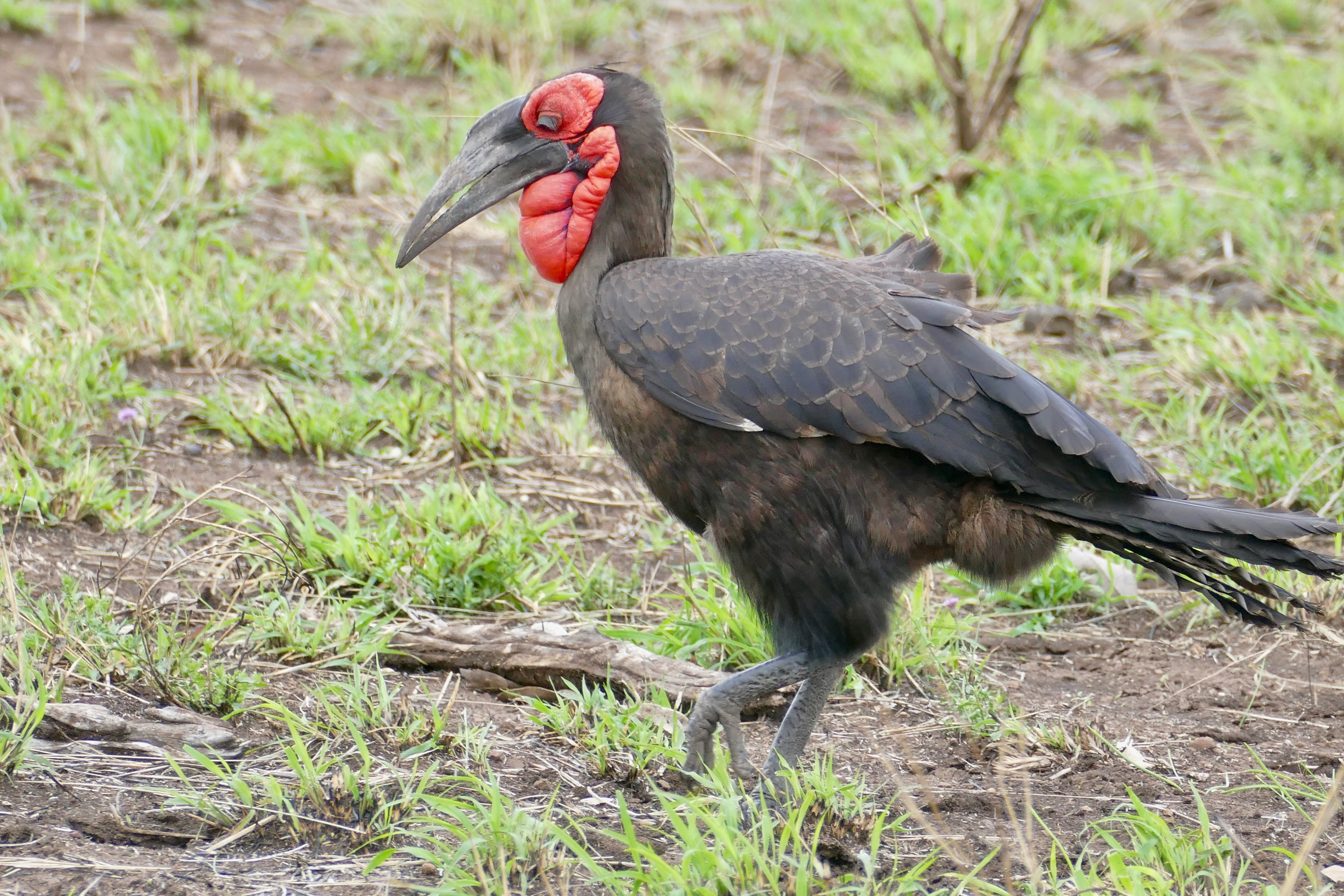
Southern ground-hornbill

Order: Bucerotiformes Family: Bucorvidae

The ground-hornbills are terrestrial birds which feed almost entirely on insects, other birds, snakes, and amphibians.

- Southern ground-hornbill, Bucorvus leadbeateri

== Hornbills ==
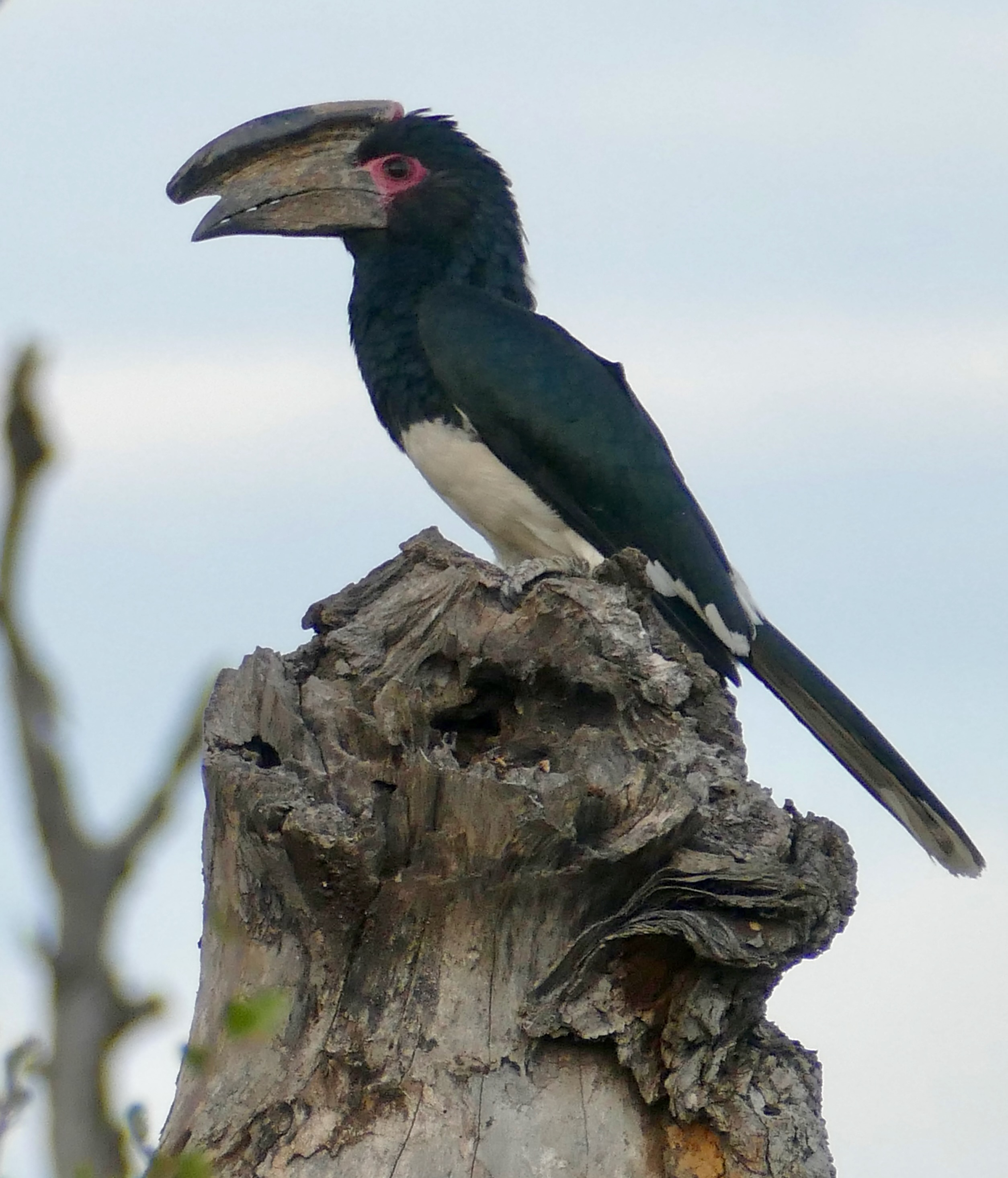
Trumpeter hornbill

Order: Bucerotiformes Family: Bucerotidae

Hornbills are a group of birds whose bill is shaped like a cow's horn, but without a twist, sometimes with a casque on the upper mandible. Frequently, the bill is brightly coloured.

- Red-billed dwarf hornbill, Lophoceros camurus
- Crowned hornbill, Lophoceros alboterminatus
- Bradfield's hornbill, Lophoceros bradfieldi
- African pied hornbill, Lophoceros fasciatus
- African gray hornbill, Lophoceros nasutus
- Pale-billed hornbill, Lophoceros pallidirostris
- Southern yellow-billed hornbill, Tockus leucomelas
- Monteiro's hornbill, Tockus monteiri
- Southern red-billed hornbill, Tockus rufirostris
- Damara red-billed hornbill, Tockus damarensis
- White-crested hornbill, Horizocerus albocristatus
- Black dwarf hornbill, Horizocerus hartlaubi
- Black-casqued hornbill, Ceratogymna atrata
- Black-and-white-casqued hornbill, Bycanistes subcylindricus
- Brown-cheeked hornbill, Bycanistes cylindricus
- White-thighed hornbill, Ceratogymna albotibialis
- Trumpeter hornbill, Bycanistes bucinator
- Piping hornbill, Bycanistes fistulator

== Kingfishers ==
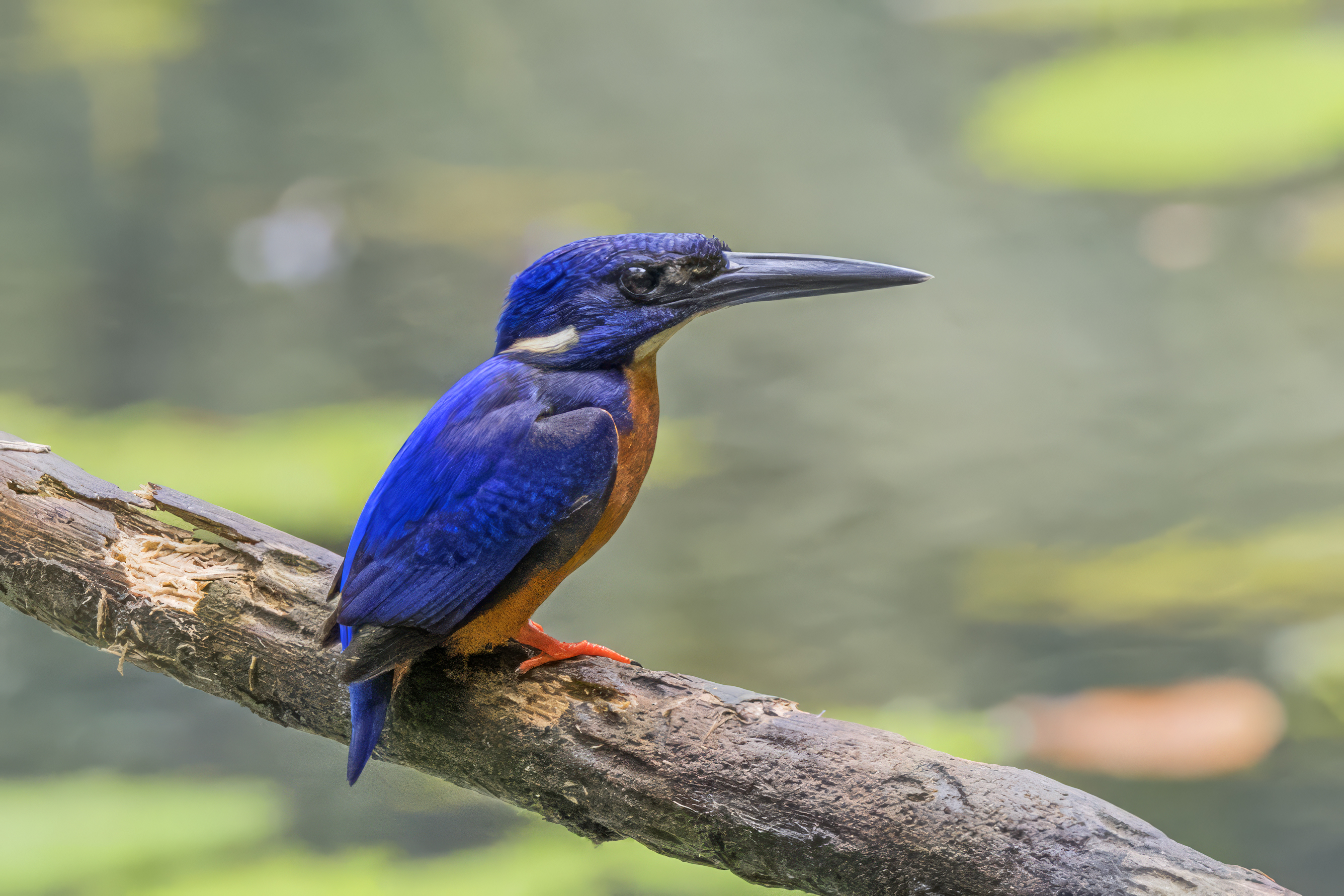
Shining-blue kingfisher

Order: Coraciiformes Family: Alcedinidae

Kingfishers are medium-sized birds with large heads, long, pointed bills, short legs and stubby tails.

- Half-collared kingfisher, Alcedo semitorquata
- Shining-blue kingfisher, Alcedo quadribrachys
- Malachite kingfisher, Corythornis cristatus
- White-bellied kingfisher, Corythornis leucogaster
- African pygmy kingfisher, Ispidina picta
- African dwarf kingfisher, Ispidina lecontei
- Chocolate-backed kingfisher, Halcyon badia
- Gray-headed kingfisher, Halcyon leucocephala
- Woodland kingfisher, Halcyon senegalensis
- Blue-breasted kingfisher, Halcyon malimbica
- Brown-hooded kingfisher, Halcyon albiventris
- Striped kingfisher, Halcyon chelicuti
- Giant kingfisher, Megaceryle maximus
- Pied kingfisher, Ceryle rudis

== Bee-eaters ==
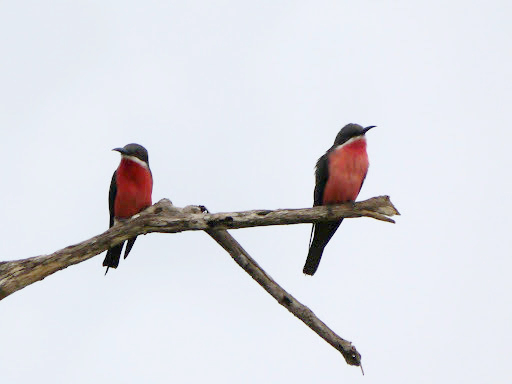
Rosy bee-eater

Order: Coraciiformes Family: Meropidae

The bee-eaters are a group of near passerine birds in the family Meropidae. Most species are found in Africa but others occur in southern Europe, Madagascar, Australia and New Guinea. They are characterised by richly coloured plumage, slender bodies and usually elongated central tail feathers. All are colourful and have long downturned bills and pointed wings, which give them a swallow-like appearance when seen from afar.

- Black bee-eater, Merops gularis
- White-fronted bee-eater, Merops bullockoides
- Little bee-eater, Merops pusillus
- Blue-breasted bee-eater, Merops variegatus
- Swallow-tailed bee-eater, Merops hirundineus
- Black-headed bee-eater, Merops breweri
- White-throated bee-eater, Merops albicollis (A)
- Blue-cheeked bee-eater, Merops persicus
- Madagascar bee-eater, Merops superciliosus
- European bee-eater, Merops apiaster
- Rosy bee-eater, Merops malimbicus
- Southern carmine bee-eater, Merops nubicoides

== Rollers ==
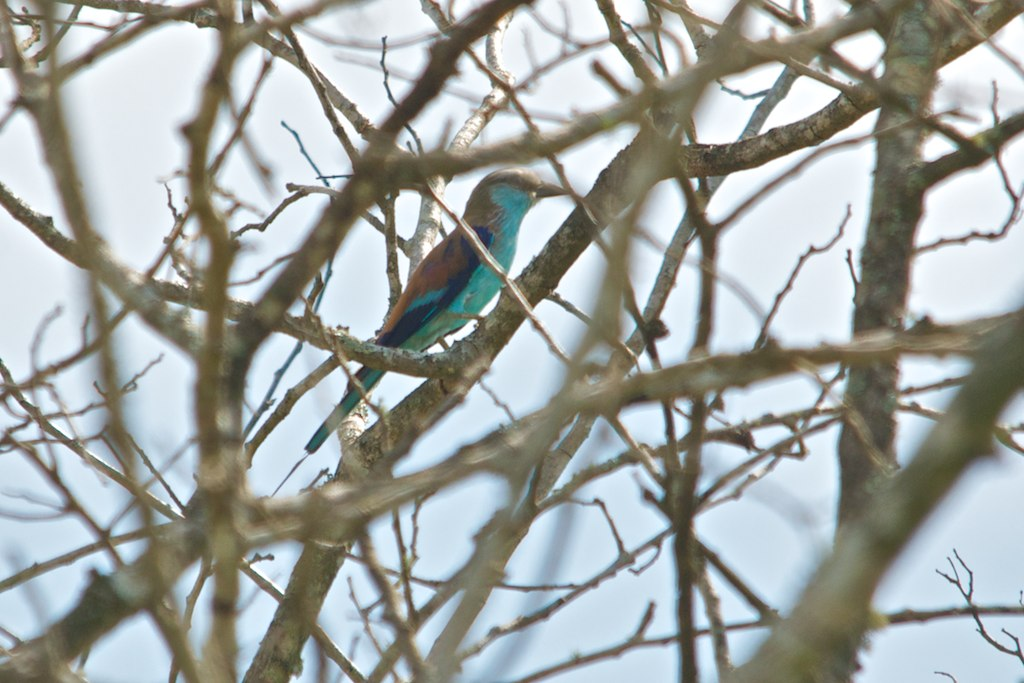
Racket-tailed roller

Order: Coraciiformes Family: Coraciidae

Rollers resemble crows in size and build, but are more closely related to the kingfishers and bee-eaters. They share the colourful appearance of those groups with blues and browns predominating. The two inner front toes are connected, but the outer toe is not.

- European roller, Coracias garrulus
- Lilac-breasted roller, Coracias caudata
- Racket-tailed roller, Coracias spatulatus
- Rufous-crowned roller, Coracias naevia
- Broad-billed roller, Eurystomus glaucurus
- Blue-throated roller, Eurystomus gularis

== African barbets ==
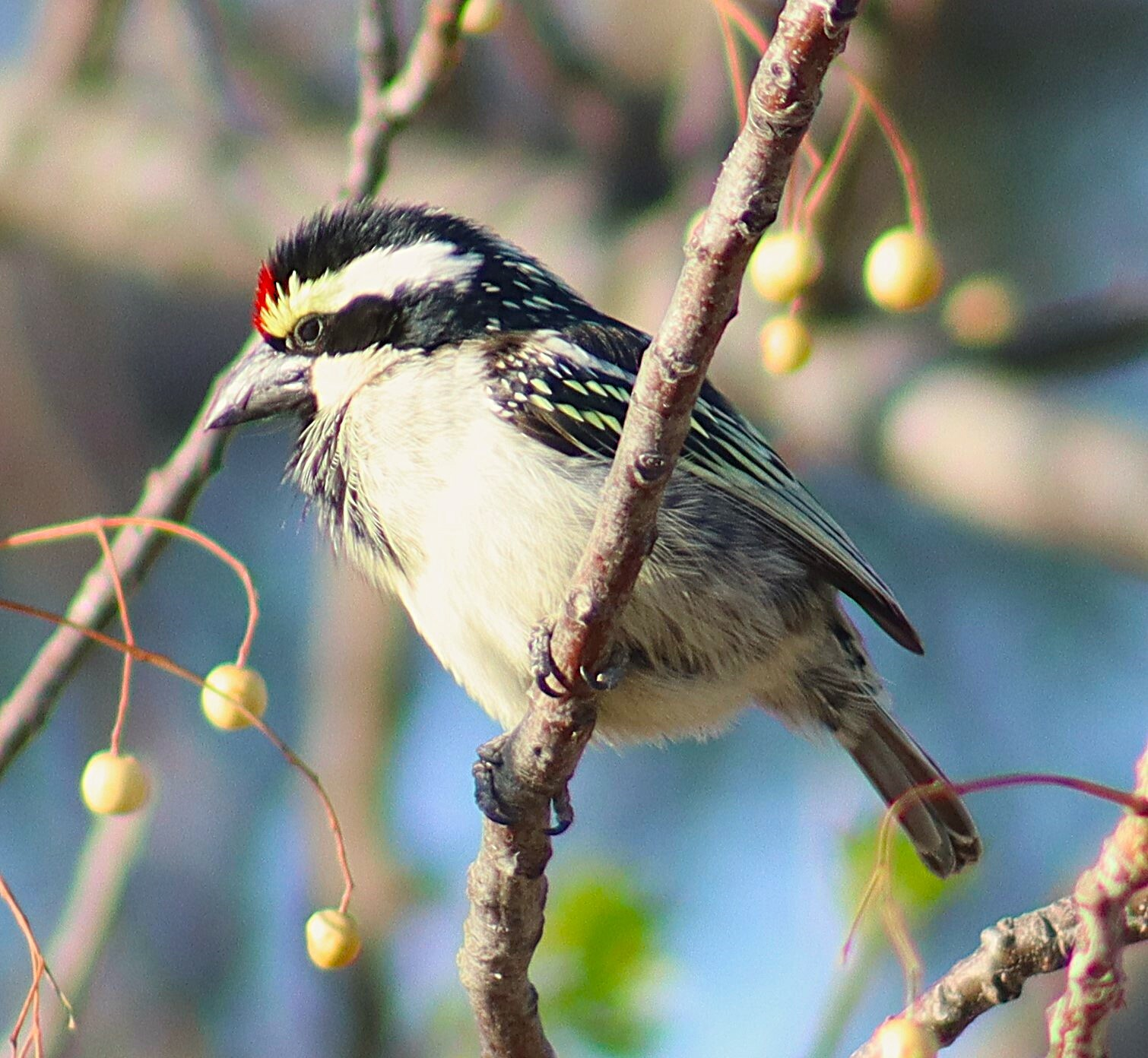
Pied barbet

Order: Piciformes Family: Lybiidae

The African barbets are plump birds, with short necks and large heads. They get their name from the bristles which fringe their heavy bills. Most species are brightly coloured.

- Yellow-billed barbet, Trachyphonus purpuratus
- Crested barbet, Trachyphonus vaillantii
- Gray-throated barbet, Gymnobucco bonapartei
- Sladen's barbet, Gymnobucco sladeni
- Bristle-nosed barbet, Gymnobucco peli
- Naked-faced barbet, Gymnobucco calvus
- Anchieta's barbet, Stactolaema anchietae
- Speckled tinkerbird, Pogoniulus scolopaceus
- Western tinkerbird, Pogoniulus coryphaea
- Red-rumped tinkerbird, Pogoniulus atroflavus
- Yellow-throated tinkerbird, Pogoniulus subsulphureus
- Yellow-rumped tinkerbird, Pogoniulus bilineatus
- Yellow-fronted tinkerbird, Pogoniulus chrysoconus
- Yellow-spotted barbet, Buccanodon duchaillui
- Hairy-breasted barbet, Tricholaema hirsuta
- Miombo barbet, Tricholaema frontata
- Pied barbet, Tricholaema leucomelas
- White-headed barbet, Lybius leucocephalus
- Black-collared barbet, Lybius torquatus
- Black-backed barbet, Lybius minor
- Double-toothed barbet, Lybius bidentatus

== Honeyguides ==
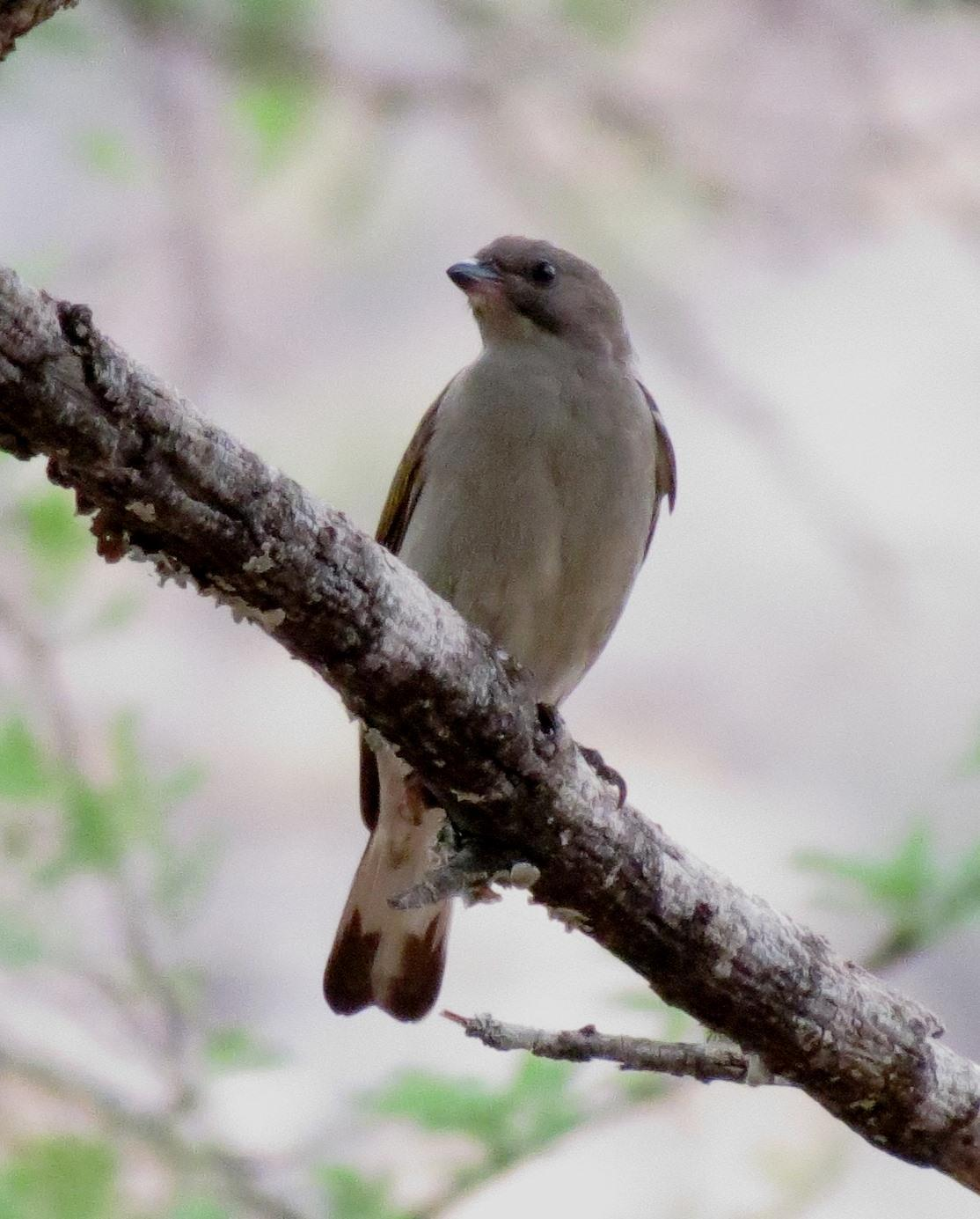
Lesser honeyguide

Order: Piciformes Family: Indicatoridae

Honeyguides are among the few birds that feed on wax. They are named for the greater honeyguide which leads traditional honey-hunters to bees' nests and, after the hunters have harvested the honey, feeds on the remaining contents of the hive.

- Cassin's honeyguide, Prodotiscus insignis
- Green-backed honeyguide, Prodotiscus zambesiae
- Wahlberg's honeyguide, Prodotiscus regulus
- Willcocks's honeyguide, Prodotiscus willcocksi (A)
- Pallid honeyguide, Indicator meliphilus
- Least honeyguide, Indicator exilis
- Lesser honeyguide, Indicator minor
- Spotted honeyguide, Indicator maculatus
- Scaly-throated honeyguide, Indicator variegatus
- Greater honeyguide, Indicator indicator
- Lyre-tailed honeyguide, Melichneutes robustus

== Woodpeckers ==
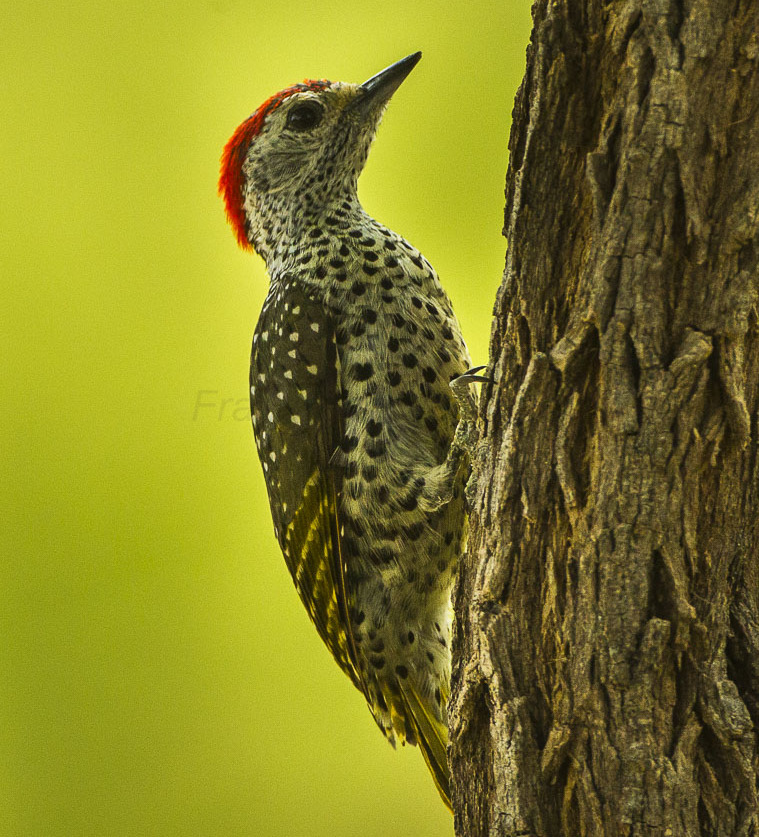
Green-backed woodpecker

Order: Piciformes Family: Picidae

Woodpeckers are small to medium-sized birds with chisel-like beaks, short legs, stiff tails and long tongues used for capturing insects. Some species have feet with two toes pointing forward and two backward, while several species have only three toes. Many woodpeckers have the habit of tapping noisily on tree trunks with their beaks.

- Rufous-necked wryneck, Jynx ruficollis
- African piculet, Verreauxia africana
- Elliot's woodpecker, Chloropicus elliotii
- Cardinal woodpecker, Chloropicus fuscescens
- Bearded woodpecker, Chloropicus namaquus
- Golden-crowned woodpecker, Chloropicus xantholophus
- African gray woodpecker, Chloropicus goertae
- Olive woodpecker, Chloropicus griseocephalus
- Brown-eared woodpecker, Campethera caroli
- Buff-spotted woodpecker, Campethera nivosa
- Green-backed woodpecker, Campethera cailliautii
- Bennett's woodpecker, Campethera bennettii
- Reichenow's woodpecker, Campethera scriptoricauda
- Golden-tailed woodpecker, Campethera abingoni

== Falcons and caracaras ==
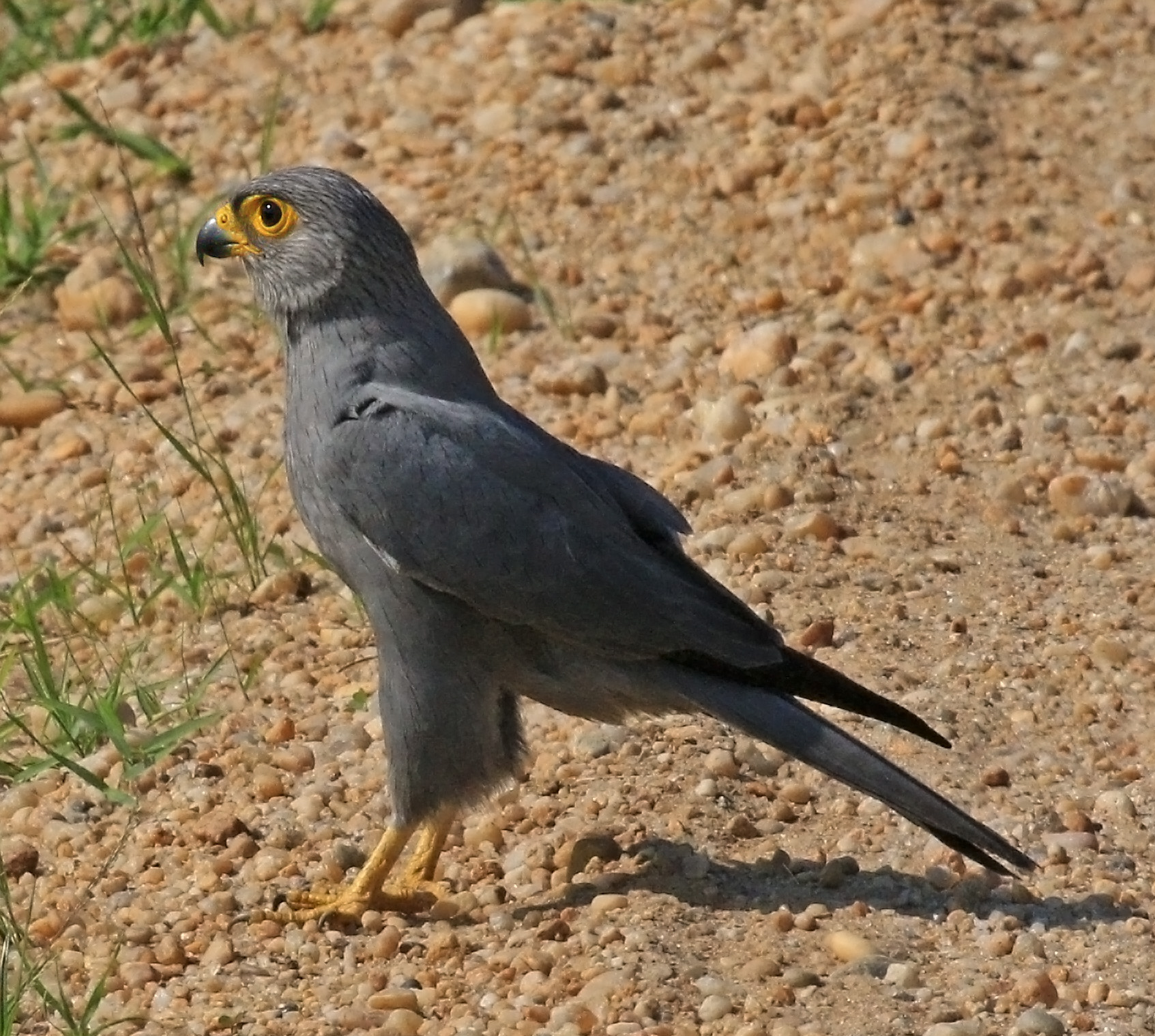
Gray kestrel

Order: Falconiformes Family: Falconidae

Falconidae is a family of diurnal birds of prey. They differ from hawks, eagles and kites in that they kill with their beaks instead of their talons.

- Pygmy falcon, Polihierax semitorquatus
- Lesser kestrel, Falco naumanni
- Eurasian kestrel, Falco tinnunculus
- Rock kestrel, Falco rupicolus
- Greater kestrel, Falco rupicoloides
- Gray kestrel, Falco ardosiaceus
- Dickinson's kestrel, Falco dickinsoni
- Red-necked falcon, Falco chicquera (A)
- Red-footed falcon, Falco vespertinus
- Amur falcon, Falco amurensis
- Eurasian hobby, Falco subbuteo
- African hobby, Falco cuvierii
- Lanner falcon, Falco biarmicus
- Peregrine falcon, Falco peregrinus

== Old World parrots ==
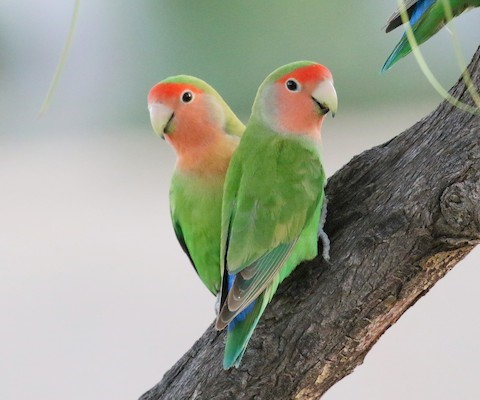
Rosy-faced lovebird

Order: Psittaciformes Family: Psittaculidae.

Characteristic features of parrots include a strong curved bill, an upright stance, strong legs, and clawed zygodactyl feet. Many parrots are vividly colored, and some are multi-colored. In size they range from 8 cm (3.1 in) to 1 m (3.3 ft) in length. Old World parrots are found from Africa east across south and southeast Asia and Oceania to Australia and New Zealand.

- Red-headed lovebird, Agapornis pullarius
- Rosy-faced lovebird, Agapornis roseicollis

== African and New World parrots ==
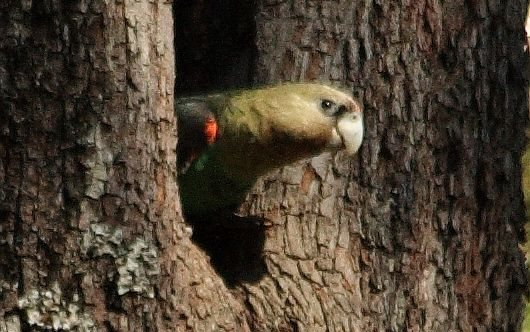
Brown-necked parrot

Order: Psittaciformes Family: Psittacidae.

Characteristic features of parrots include a strong curved bill, an upright stance, strong legs, and clawed zygodactyl feet. Many parrots are vividly coloured, and some are multi-coloured. In size they range from 8 cm (3.1 in) to 1 m (3.3 ft) in length. Most of the more than 150 species in this family are found in the New World.

- Gray parrot, Psittacus erithacus
- Brown-necked parrot, Poicephalus robustus
- Red-fronted parrot, Poicephalus gulielmi
- Meyer's parrot, Poicephalus meyeri
- Rüppell's parrot, Poicephalus rueppellii

== African and green broadbills ==
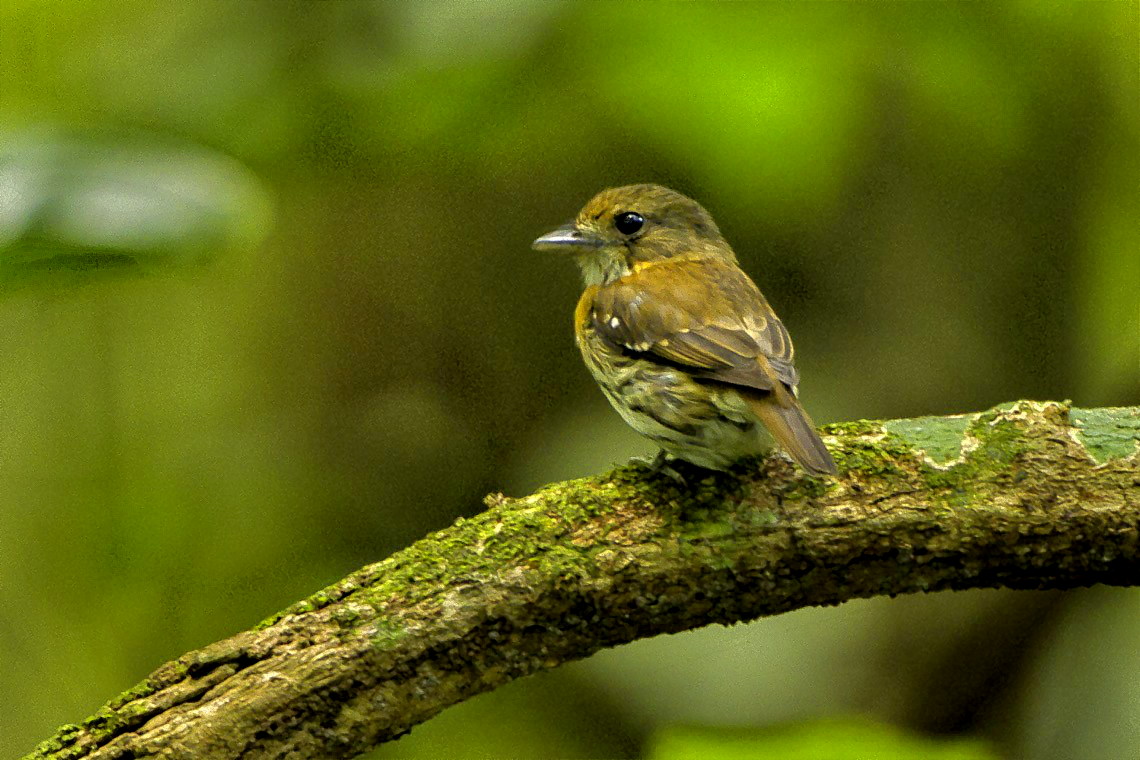
Rufous-sided broadbill

Order: Passeriformes Family: Calyptomenidae

The broadbills are small, brightly coloured birds, which feed on fruit and also take insects in flycatcher fashion, snapping their broad bills. Their habitat is canopies of wet forests.

- African broadbill, Smithornis capensis
- Rufous-sided broadbill, Smithornis rufolateralis

== Pittas ==
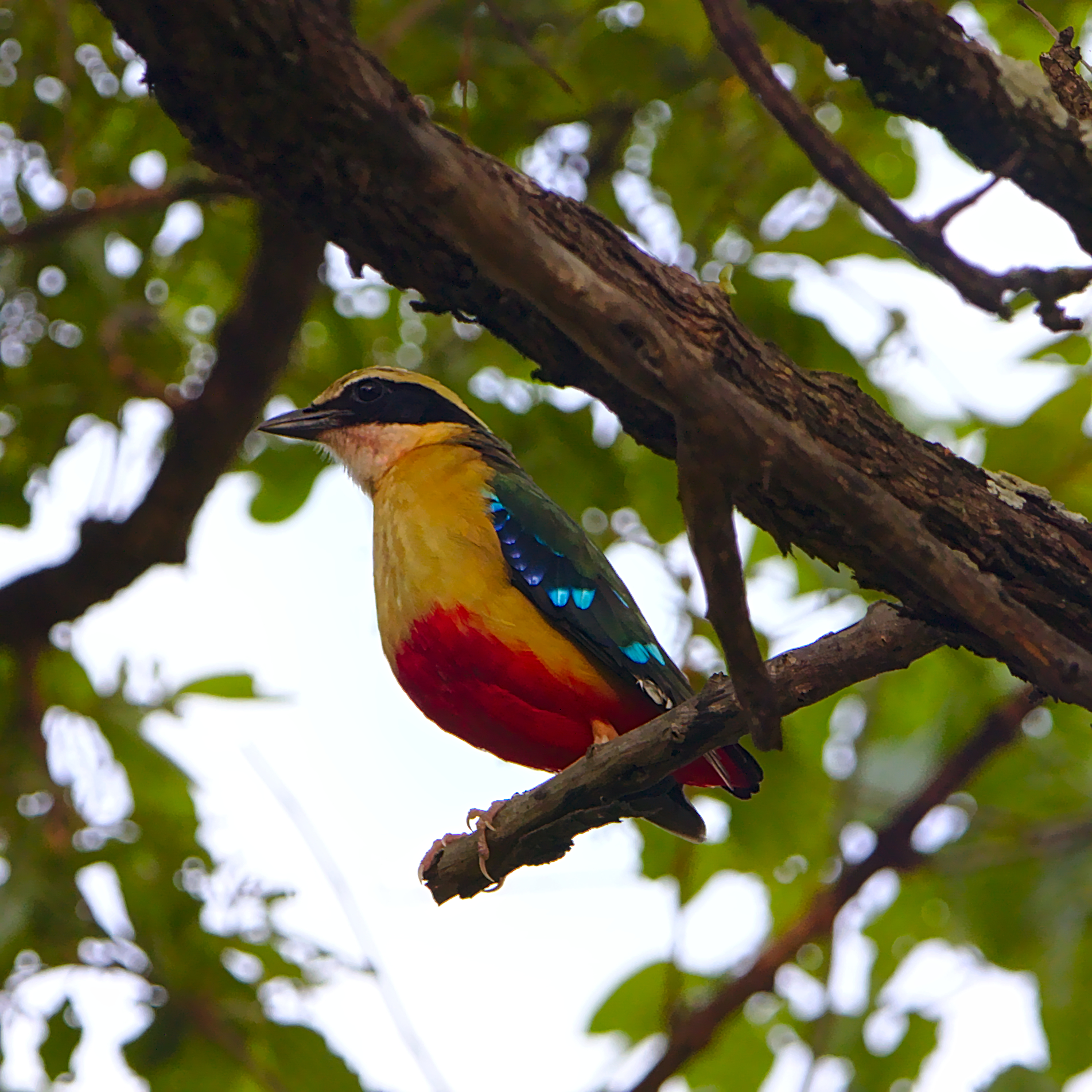
African pitta

Order: Passeriformes Family: Pittidae

Pittas are medium-sized by passerine standards and are stocky, with fairly long, strong legs, short tails and stout bills. Many are brightly coloured. They spend the majority of their time on wet forest floors, eating snails, insects and similar invertebrates.

- African pitta, Pitta angolensis

== Cuckooshrikes ==
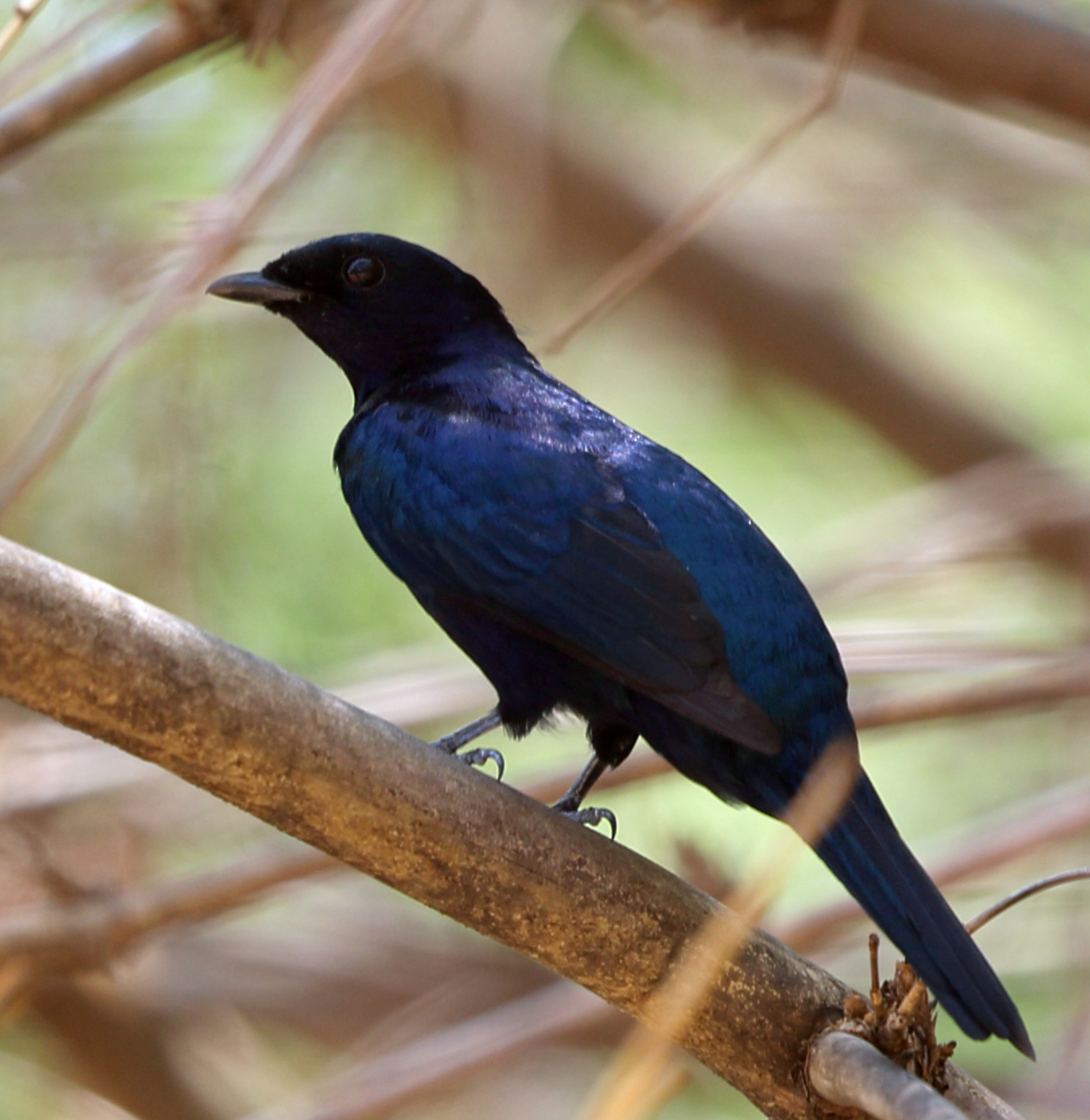
Purple-throated cuckooshrike

Order: Passeriformes Family: Campephagidae

The cuckooshrikes are small to medium-sized passerine birds. They are predominantly greyish with white and black, although some species are brightly coloured.

- White-breasted cuckooshrike, Coracina pectoralis
- Black cuckooshrike, Campephaga flava
- Petit's cuckooshrike, Campephaga petiti
- Red-shouldered cuckooshrike, Campephaga phoenicea
- Purple-throated cuckooshrike, Campephaga quiscalina

== Old World orioles ==
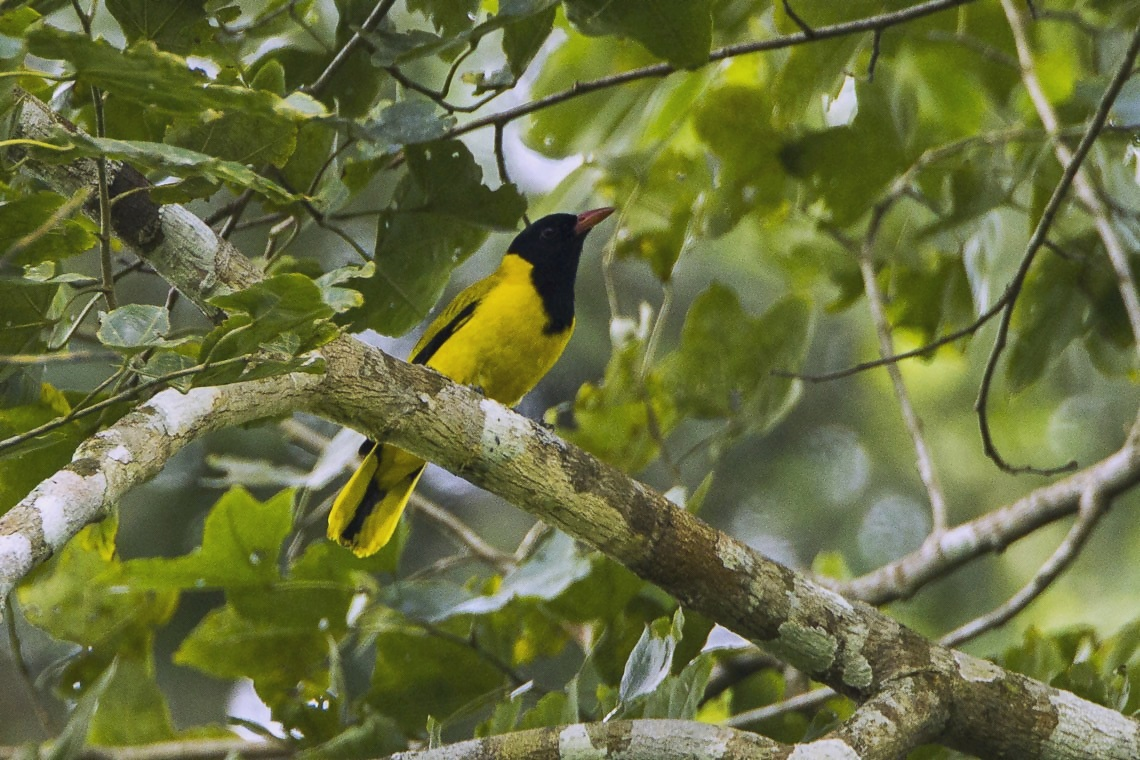
Black-winged oriole

Order: Passeriformes Family: Oriolidae

The Old World orioles are colourful passerine birds. They are not related to the New World orioles.

- Eurasian golden oriole, Oriolus oriolus
- African golden oriole, Oriolus auratus
- Western black-headed oriole, Oriolus brachyrynchus
- African black-headed oriole, Oriolus larvatus
- Black-winged oriole, Oriolus nigripennis

== Wattle-eyes and batises ==
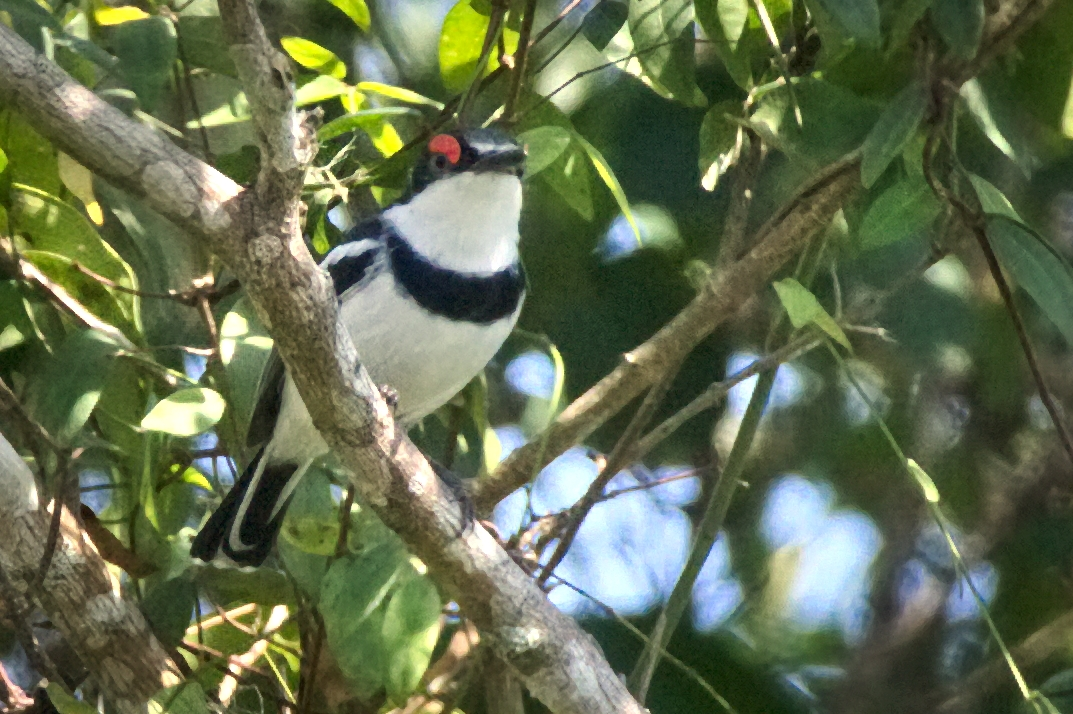
White-fronted wattle-eye

Order: Passeriformes Family: Platysteiridae

The wattle-eyes, or puffback flycatchers, are small stout passerine birds of the African tropics. They get their name from the brightly coloured fleshy eye decorations found in most species in this group.

- White-tailed shrike, Lanioturdus torquatus
- Brown-throated wattle-eye, Platysteira cyanea
- White-fronted wattle-eye, Platysteira albifrons (E)
- Black-throated wattle-eye, Platysteira peltata
- Chestnut wattle-eye, Platysteira castanea
- Red-cheeked wattle-eye, Platysteira blissetti
- Black-necked wattle-eye, Platysteira chalybea
- Yellow-bellied wattle-eye, Platysteira concreta
- Boulton's batis, Batis margaritae
- Chinspot batis, Batis molitor
- Pririt batis, Batis pririt
- Western black-headed batis, Batis erlangeri
- Angolan batis, Batis minulla

== Vangas, helmetshrikes, and allies ==
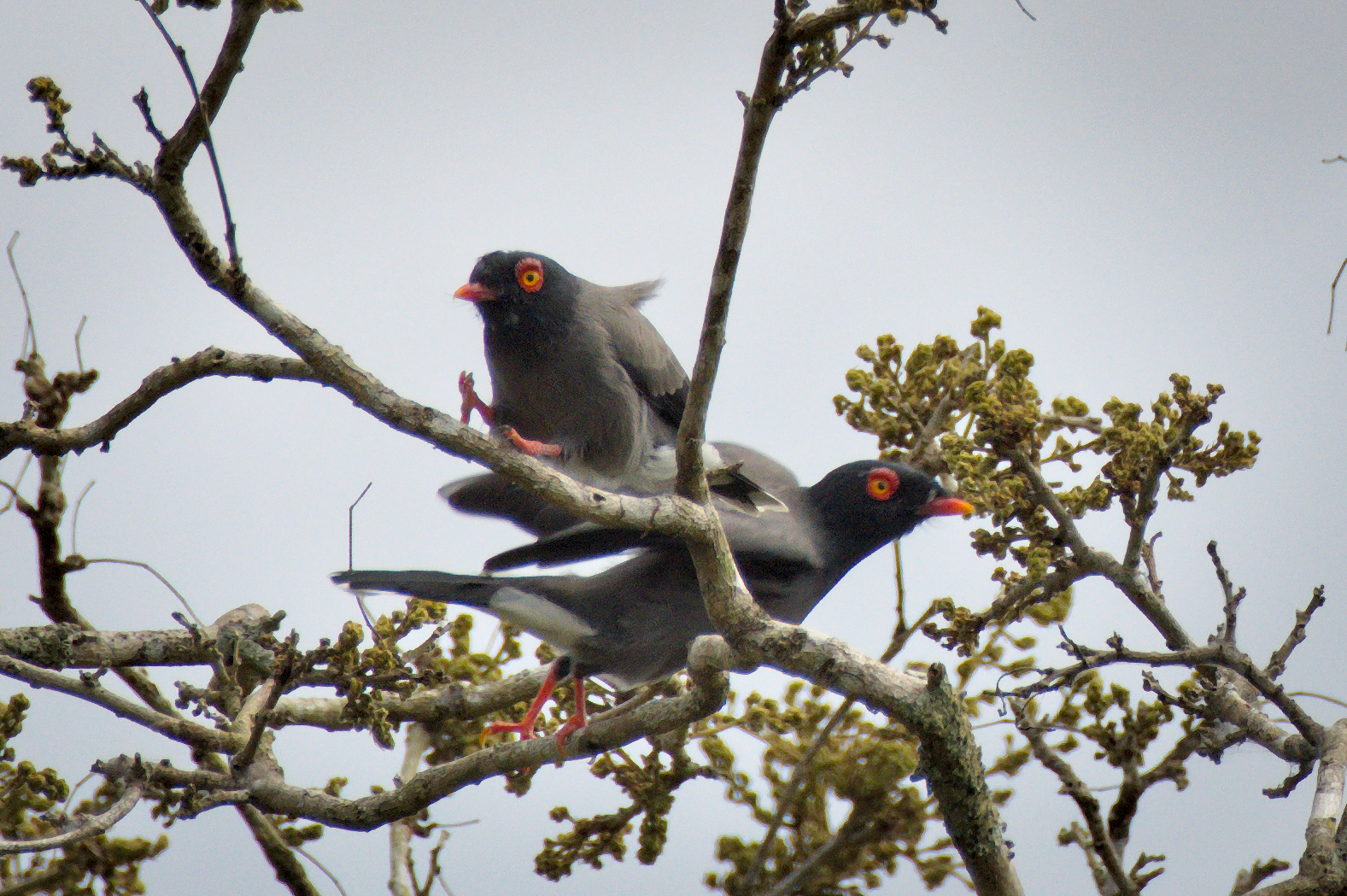
Angola helmetshrike

Order: Passeriformes Family: Vangidae

The helmetshrikes are similar in build to the shrikes, but tend to be colourful species with distinctive crests or other head ornaments, such as wattles, from which they get their name.

- White helmetshrike, Prionops plumatus
- Red-billed helmetshrike, Prionops caniceps
- Rufous-bellied helmetshrike, Prionops rufiventris
- Retz's helmetshrike, Prionops retzii
- Angola helmetshrike, Prionops gabela (E)
- African shrike-flycatcher, Megabyas flammulatus
- Black-and-white shrike-flycatcher, Bias musicus

== Bushshrikes and allies ==
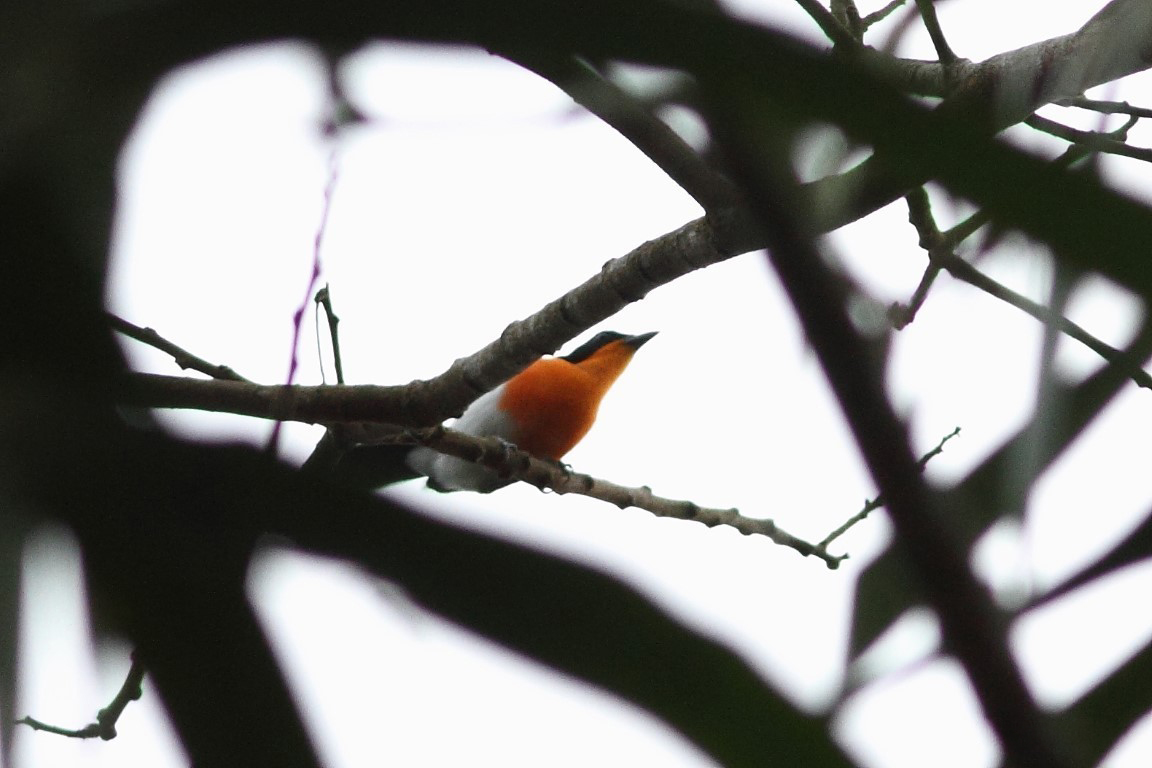
Braun's bushshrike

Order: Passeriformes Family: Malaconotidae

Bushshrikes are similar in habits to shrikes, hunting insects and other small prey from a perch on a bush. Although similar in build to the shrikes, these tend to be either colourful species or largely black; some species are quite secretive.

- Brubru, Nilaus afer
- Northern puffback, Dryoscopus gambensis
- Black-backed puffback, Dryoscopus cubla
- Red-eyed puffback, Dryoscopus senegalensis
- Pink-footed puffback, Dryoscopus angolensis
- Sabine's puffback, Dryoscopus sabini
- Marsh tchagra, Tchagra minuta
- Black-crowned tchagra, Tchagra senegala
- Brown-crowned tchagra, Tchagra australis
- Lühder's bushshrike, Laniarius luehderi
- Braun's bushshrike, Laniarius brauni (E)
- Gabela bushshrike, Laniarius amboimensis (E)
- Tropical boubou, Laniarius major
- Gabon boubou, Laniarius bicolor
- Crimson-breasted gonolek, Laniarius atrococcineus
- Lowland sooty boubou, Laniarius leucorhynchus
- Bokmakierie, Telophorus zeylonus
- Gray-green bushshrike, Telophorus bocagei
- Sulphur-breasted bushshrike, Telophorus sulfureopectus
- Many-colored bushshrike, Telophorus multicolor
- Black-fronted bushshrike, Telophorus nigrifrons
- Four-colored bushshrike, Telophorus viridis
- Gray-headed bushshrike, Malaconotus blanchoti
- Monteiro's bushshrike, Malaconotus monteiri

== Drongos ==
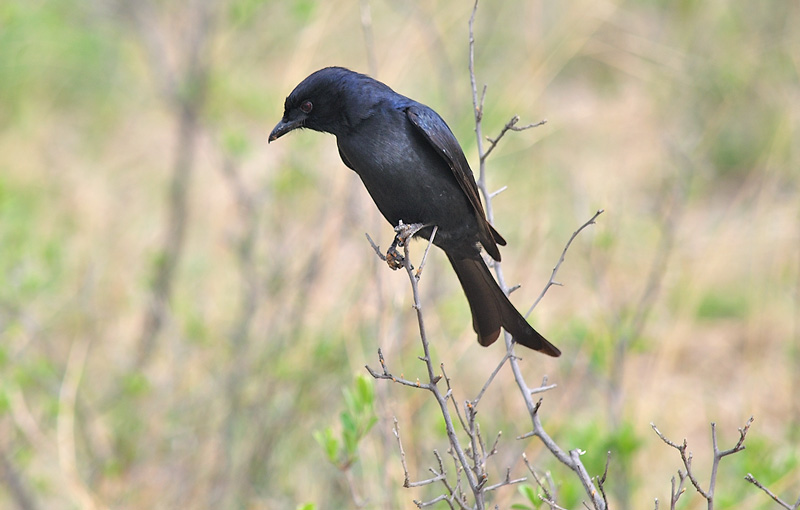
Fork-tailed drongo

Order: Passeriformes Family: Dicruridae

The drongos are mostly black or dark grey in colour, sometimes with metallic tints. They have long forked tails, and some Asian species have elaborate tail decorations. They have short legs and sit very upright when perched, like a shrike. They flycatch or take prey from the ground.

- Sharpe's drongo, Dicrurus sharpei
- Common square-tailed drongo, Dicrurus ludwigii
- Fork-tailed drongo, Dicrurus adsimilis
- Fanti drongo, Dicrurus atactus
- Velvet-mantled drongo, Dicrurus modestus
- Hair-crested drongo, Dicrurus hottentottus

== Monarch flycatchers ==
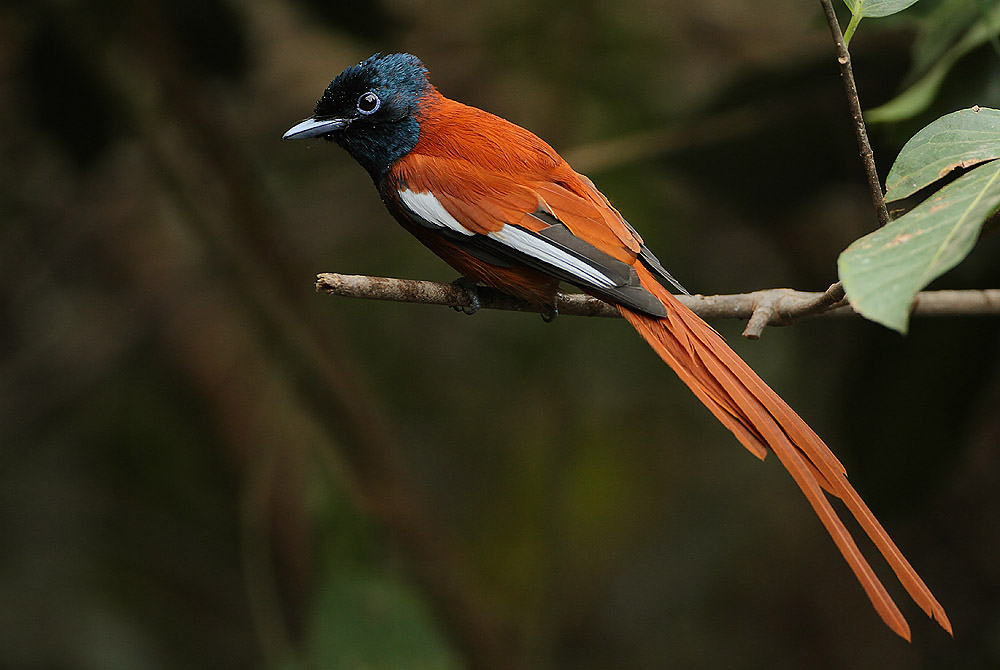
Black-headed paradise-flycatcher

Order: Passeriformes Family: Monarchidae

The monarch flycatchers are small to medium-sized insectivorous passerines which hunt by flycatching.

- Blue-headed crested-flycatcher, Trochocercus nitens
- Black-headed paradise-flycatcher, Terpsiphone rufiventer
- Rufous-vented paradise-flycatcher, Terpsiphone rufocinerea
- Bates's paradise-flycatcher, Terpsiphone batesi
- African paradise-flycatcher, Terpsiphone viridis

== Shrikes ==
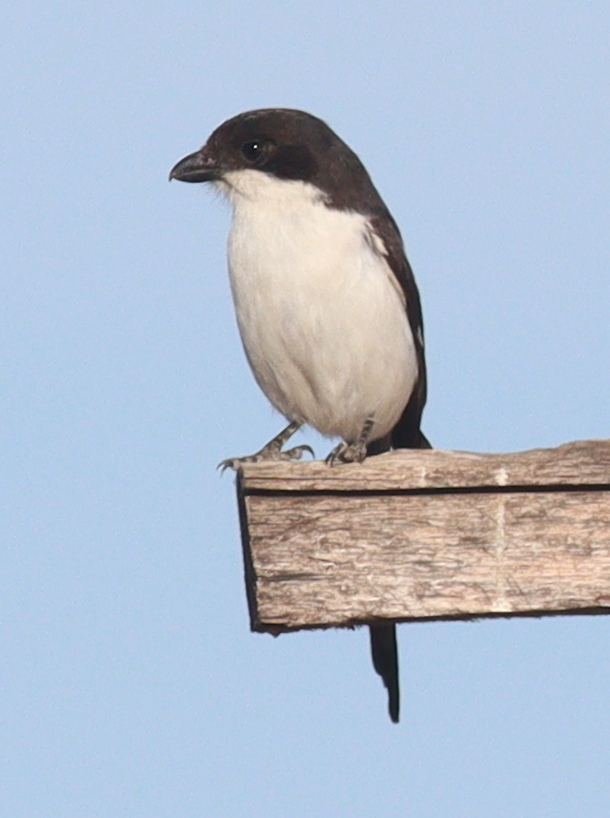
Northern fiscal

Order: Passeriformes Family: Laniidae

Shrikes are passerine birds known for their habit of catching other birds and small animals and impaling the uneaten portions of their bodies on thorns. A typical shrike's beak is hooked, like a bird of prey.

- Red-backed shrike, Lanius collurio
- Lesser gray shrike, Lanius minor
- Magpie shrike, Lanius melanoleucus
- Mackinnon's shrike, Lanius mackinnoni
- Northern fiscal, Lanius humeralis
- Southern fiscal, Lanius collaris
- Souza's shrike, Lanius souzae
- Woodchat shrike, Lanius senator (A)
- White-crowned shrike, Eurocephalus anguitimens

== Crows, jays, and magpies ==
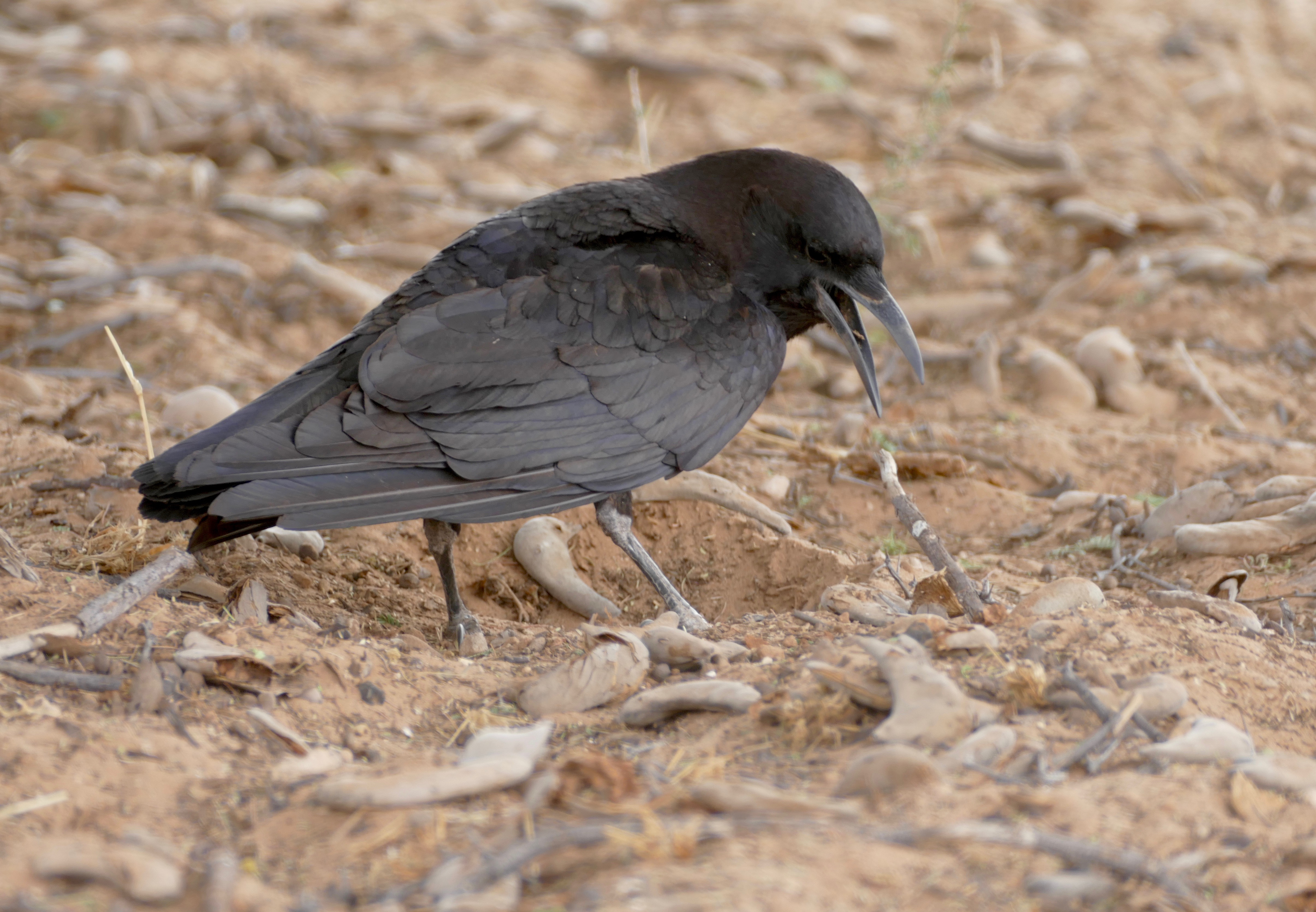
Cape crow

Order: Passeriformes Family: Corvidae

The family Corvidae includes crows, ravens, jays, choughs, magpies, treepies, nutcrackers and ground jays. Corvids are above average in size among the Passeriformes, and some of the larger species show high levels of intelligence.

- Cape crow, Corvus capensis
- Pied crow, Corvus albus

== Hyliotas ==
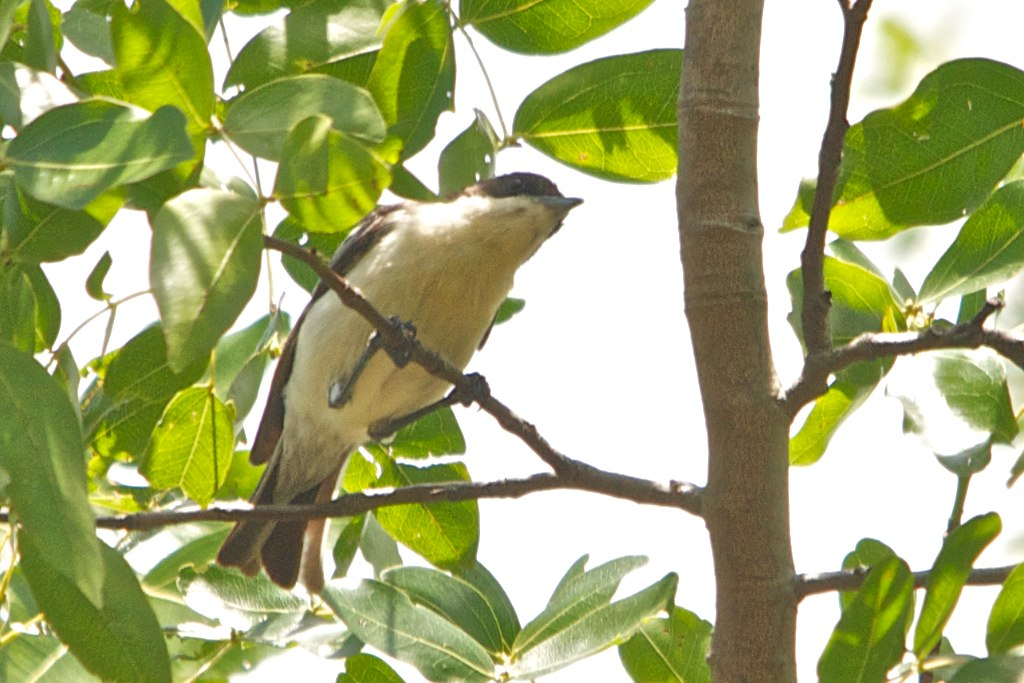
Southern hyliota

Order: Passeriformes Family: Hyliotidae

The members of this small family, all of genus Hyliota, are birds of the forest canopy. They tend to feed in mixed-species flocks.

- Yellow-bellied hyliota, Hyliota flavigaster
- Southern hyliota, Hyliota australis

== Fairy flycatchers ==
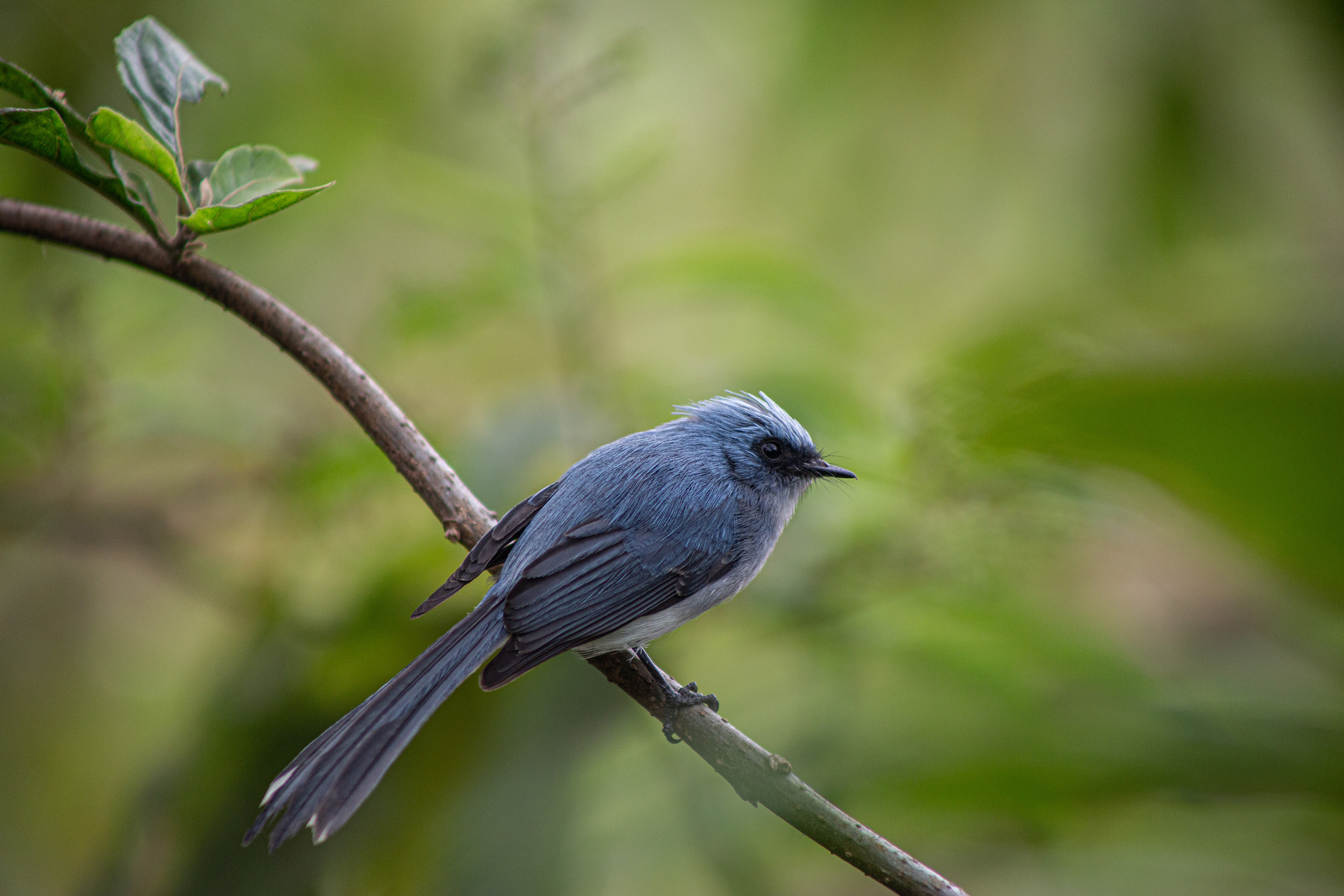
White-tailed blue flycatcher

Order: Passeriformes Family: Stenostiridae

Most of the species of this small family are found in Africa, though a few inhabit tropical Asia. They are not closely related to other birds called "flycatchers".

- African blue flycatcher, Elminia longicauda
- White-tailed blue flycatcher, Elminia albicauda

== Tits, chickadees, and titmice ==
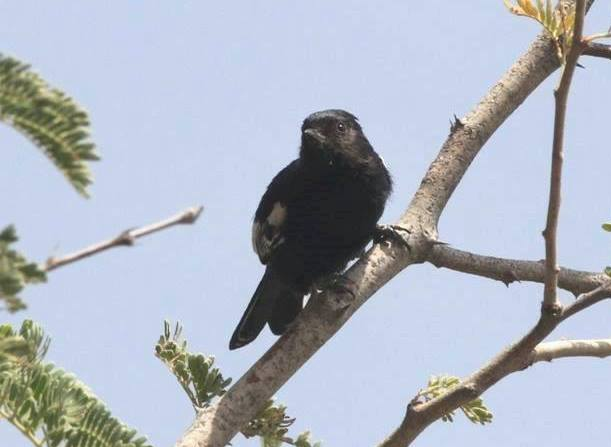
Carp's tit

Order: Passeriformes Family: Paridae

The Paridae are mainly small stocky woodland species with short stout bills. Some have crests. They are adaptable birds, with a mixed diet including seeds and insects.

- White-winged black-tit, Melaniparus leucomelas
- Rufous-bellied tit, Melaniparus rufiventris
- Southern black-tit, Melaniparus niger
- Carp's tit, Melaniparus carpi
- Dusky tit, Melaniparus funereus
- Miombo tit, Melaniparus griseiventris
- Ashy tit, Melaniparus cinerascens

== Penduline-tits ==
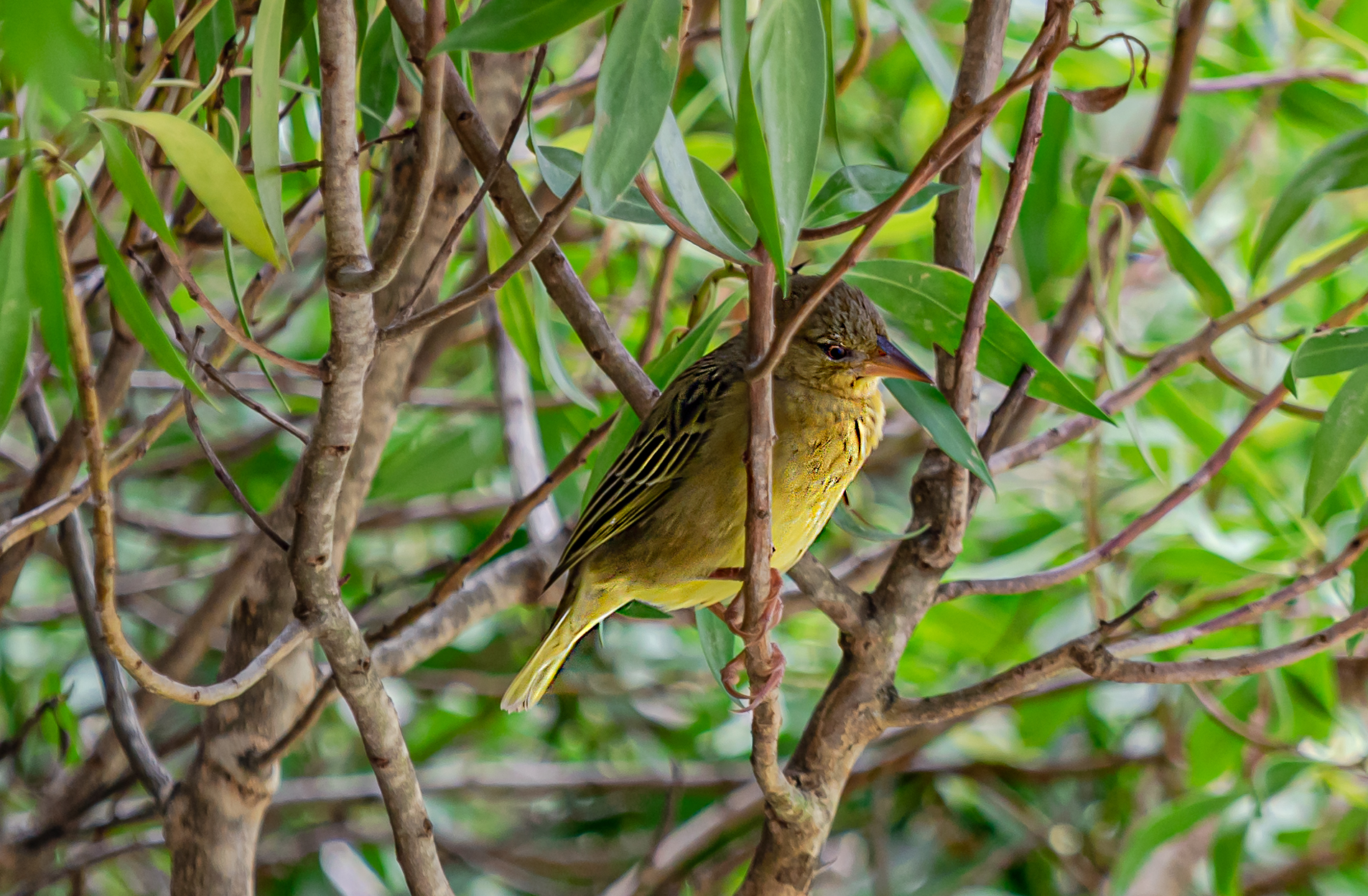
Southern penduline-tit

Order: Passeriformes Family: Remizidae

The penduline-tits are a group of small passerine birds related to the true tits. They are insectivores.

- African penduline-tit, Anthoscopus caroli
- Southern penduline-tit, Anthoscopus minutus

== Larks ==
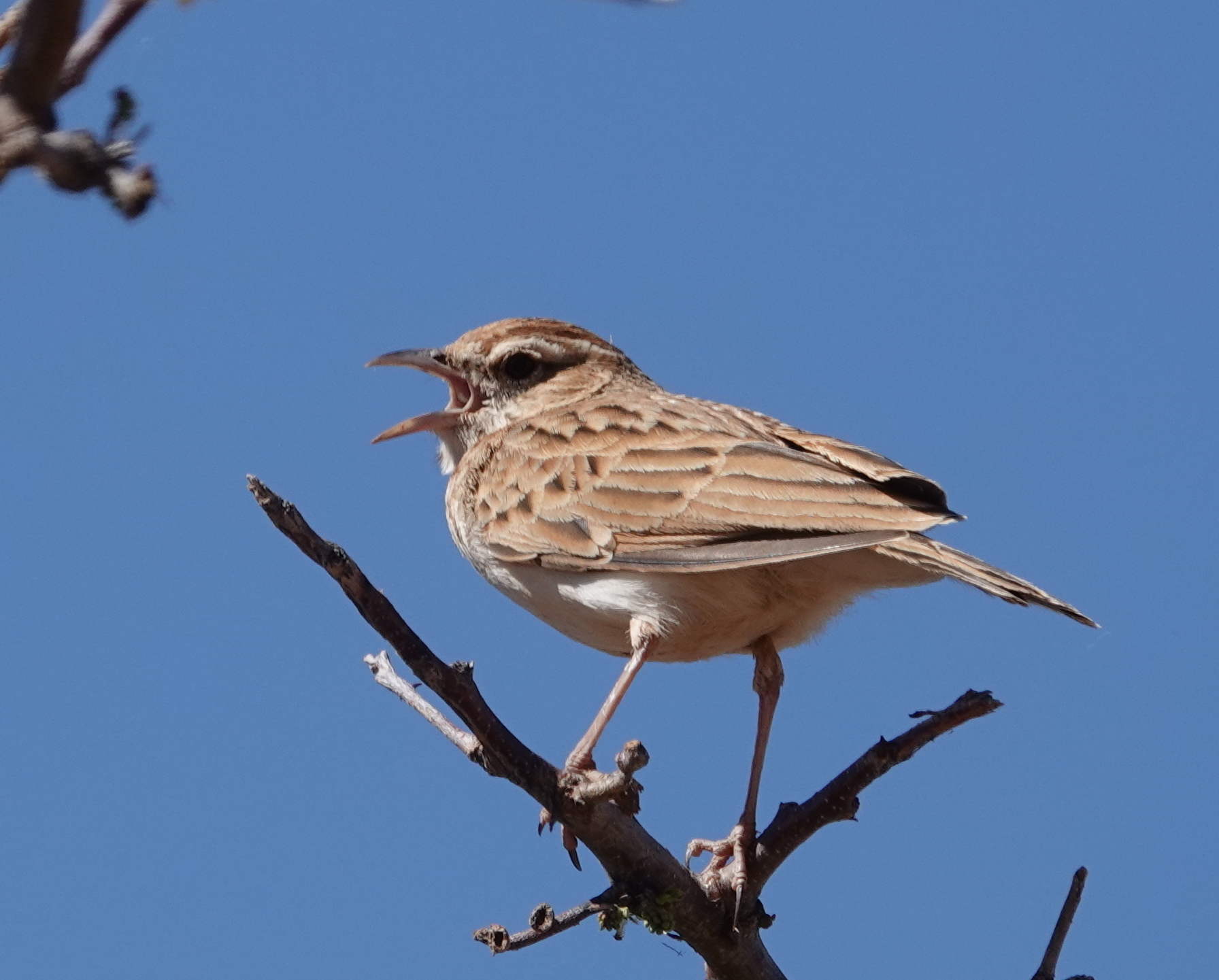
Fawn-coloured lark

Order: Passeriformes Family: Alaudidae

Larks are small terrestrial birds with often extravagant songs and display flights. Most larks are fairly dull in appearance. Their food is insects and seeds.

- Spike-heeled lark, Chersomanes albofasciata
- Gray's lark, Ammomanopsis grayi
- Karoo long-billed lark, Certhilauda subcoronata
- Dusky lark, Pinarocorys nigricans
- Chestnut-backed sparrow-lark, Eremopterix leucotis
- Gray-backed sparrow-lark, Eremopterix verticalis
- Sabota lark, Calendulauda sabota
- Fawn-coloured lark, Calendulauda africanoides
- Rufous-naped lark, Mirafra africana
- Angola lark, Mirafra angolensis
- Flappet lark, Mirafra rufocinnamomea
- Monotonous lark, Mirafra passerina (A)
- Red-capped lark, Calandrella cinerea
- Stark's lark, Spizocorys starki
- Pink-billed lark, Spizocorys conirostris (A)

== Nicators ==
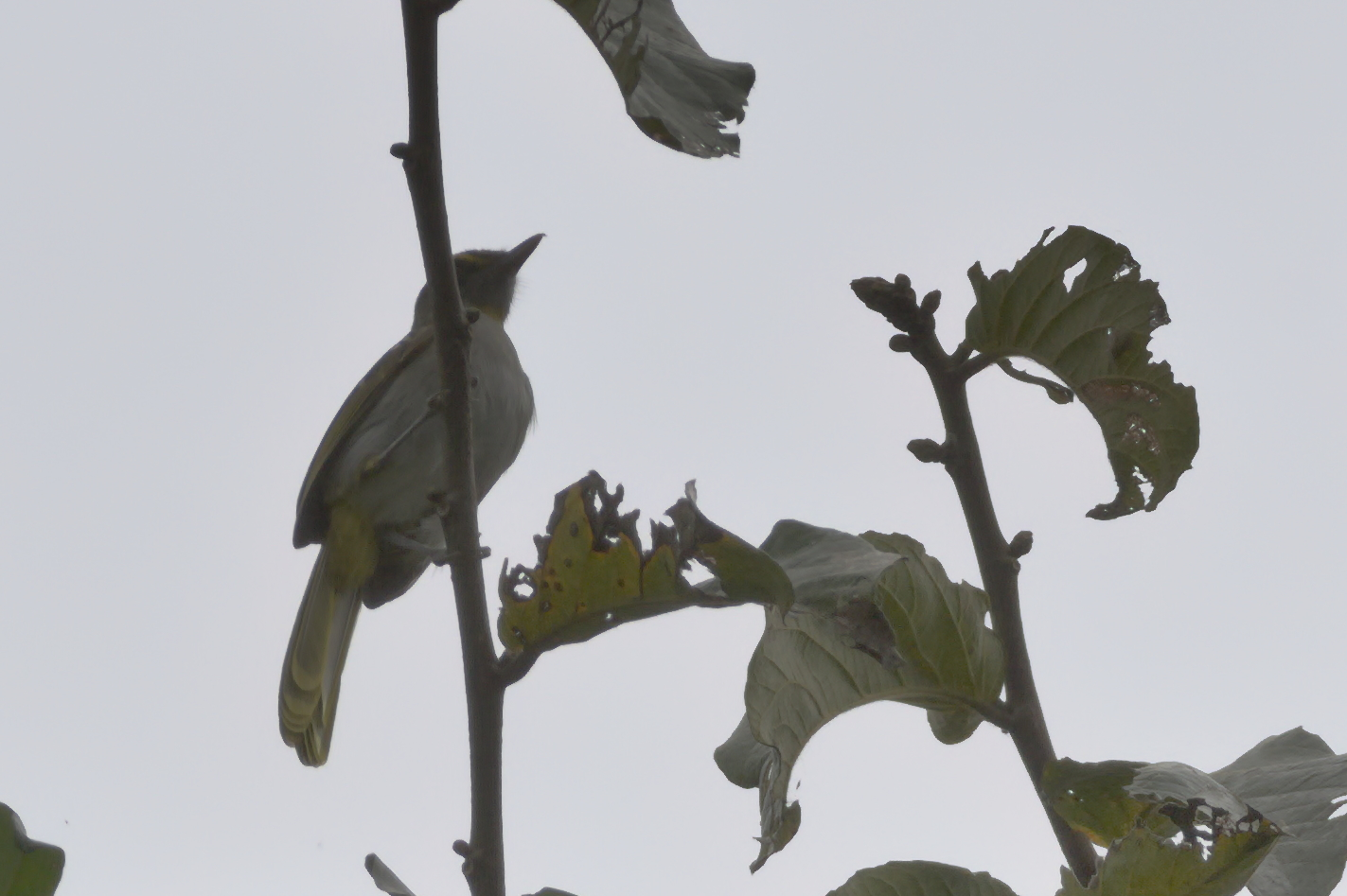
Yellow-throated nicator

Order: Passeriformes Family: Nicatoridae

The nicators are shrike-like, with hooked bills. They are endemic to sub-Saharan Africa.

- Western nicator, Nicator chloris
- Yellow-throated nicator, Nicator vireo

== African warblers ==
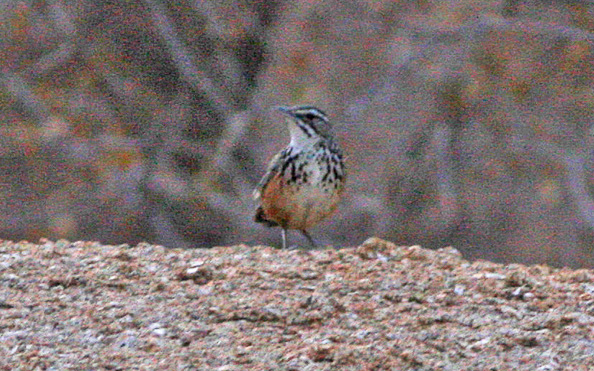
Rockrunner

Order: Passeriformes Family: Macrosphenidae

African warblers are small to medium-sized insectivores which are found in a wide variety of habitats south of the Sahara.

- Green crombec, Sylvietta virens
- Lemon-bellied crombec, Sylvietta denti
- Red-capped crombec, Sylvietta ruficapilla
- Cape crombec, Sylvietta rufescens
- Rockrunner, Achaetops pycnopygius
- Moustached grass-warbler, Melocichla mentalis
- Yellow longbill, Macrosphenus flavicans
- Gray longbill, Macrosphenus concolor
- Pulitzer's longbill, Macrosphenus pulitzeri (E)
- Green hylia, Hylia prasina
- Tit-hylia, Pholidornis rushiae

== Cisticolas and allies ==
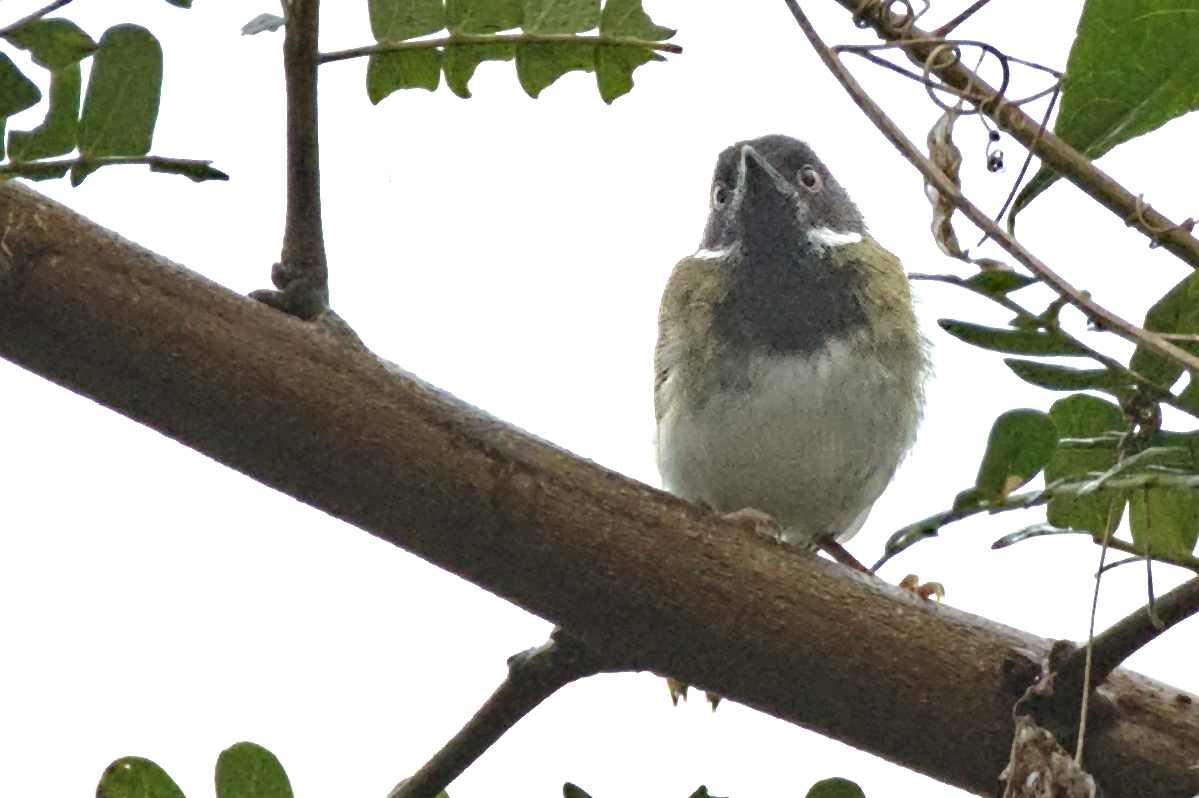
Masked apalis

Order: Passeriformes Family: Cisticolidae

The Cisticolidae are warblers found mainly in warmer southern regions of the Old World. They are generally very small birds of drab brown or grey appearance found in open country such as grassland or scrub.

- Salvadori's eremomela, Eremomela salvadorii
- Yellow-bellied eremomela, Eremomela icteropygialis
- Greencap eremomela, Eremomela scotops
- Rufous-crowned eremomela, Eremomela badiceps
- Black-necked eremomela, Eremomela atricollis
- Burnt-neck eremomela, Eremomela usticollis
- White-chinned prinia, Schistolais leucopogon
- Miombo wren-warbler, Calamonastes undosus
- Stierling's wren-warbler, Calamonastes stierlingi
- Barred wren-warbler, Calamonastes fasciolatus
- Green-backed camaroptera, Calamonastes brachyura
- Hartert's camaroptera, Calamonastes harterti
- Yellow-browed camaroptera, Calamonastes superciliaris
- Olive-green camaroptera, Calamonastes chloronota
- Black-throated apalis, Apalis jacksoni
- Masked apalis, Apalis binotata
- Yellow-breasted apalis, Apalis flavida
- Buff-throated apalis, Apalis rufogularis
- Gosling's apalis, Apalis goslingi
- Gray apalis, Apalis cinerea
- Brown-headed apalis, Apalis alticola
- Tawny-flanked prinia, Prinia subflava
- Black-chested prinia, Prinia flavicans
- Banded prinia, Prinia bairdii
- Red-faced cisticola, Cisticola erythrops
- Singing cisticola, Cisticola cantans
- Whistling cisticola, Cisticola lateralis
- Chattering cisticola, Cisticola anonymus
- Bubbling cisticola, Cisticola bulliens
- Rock-loving cisticola, Cisticola aberrans
- Rattling cisticola, Cisticola chiniana
- Tinkling cisticola, Cisticola rufilatus
- Red-headed cisticola, Cisticola subruficapillus
- Wailing cisticola, Cisticola lais
- Luapula cisticola, Cisticola luapula
- Chirping cisticola, Cisticola pipiens
- Winding cisticola, Cisticola marginatus
- Levaillant's cisticola, Cisticola tinniens
- Stout cisticola, Cisticola robustus
- Croaking cisticola, Cisticola natalensis
- Piping cisticola, Cisticola fulvicapillus
- Slender-tailed cisticola, Cisticola melanurus
- Siffling cisticola, Cisticola brachypterus
- Zitting cisticola, Cisticola juncidis
- Desert cisticola, Cisticola aridulus
- Cloud cisticola, Cisticola textrix
- Cloud-scraping cisticola, Cisticola dambo
- Pale-crowned cisticola, Cisticola cinnamomeus
- Wing-snapping cisticola, Cisticola ayresii

== Reed warblers and allies ==
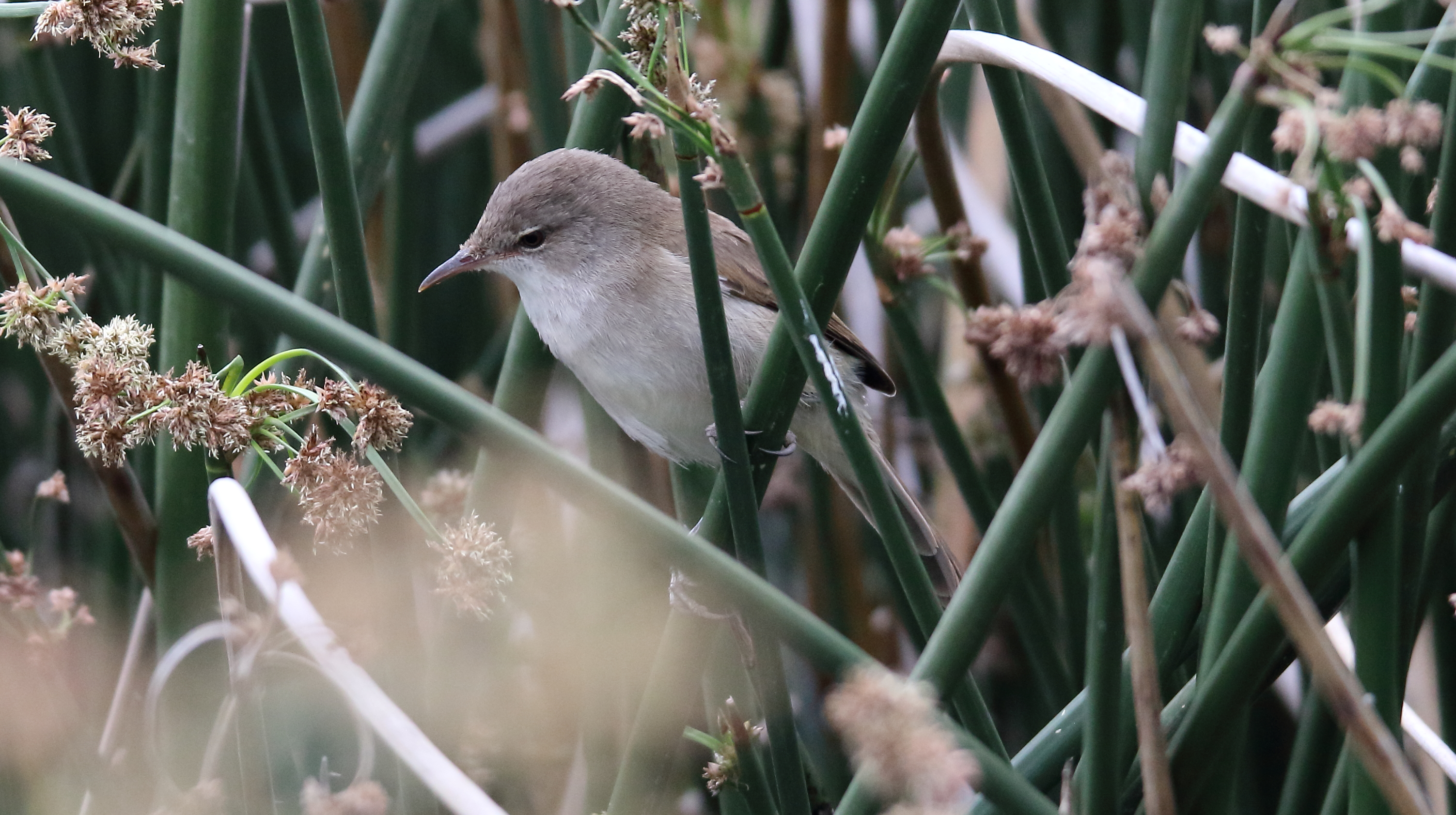
Lesser swamp warbler

Order: Passeriformes Family: Acrocephalidae

The members of this family are usually rather large for "warblers". Most are rather plain olivaceous brown above with much yellow to beige below. They are usually found in open woodland, reedbeds, or tall grass. The family occurs mostly in southern to western Eurasia and surroundings, but it also ranges far into the Pacific, with some species in Africa.

- African yellow-warbler, Iduna natalensis
- Icterine warbler, Hippolais icterina
- Sedge warbler, Acrocephalus schoenobaenus
- Common reed warbler, Acrocephalus scirpaceus
- Lesser swamp warbler, Acrocephalus gracilirostris
- Greater swamp warbler, Acrocephalus rufescens
- Great reed warbler, Acrocephalus arundinaceus

== Grassbirds and allies ==
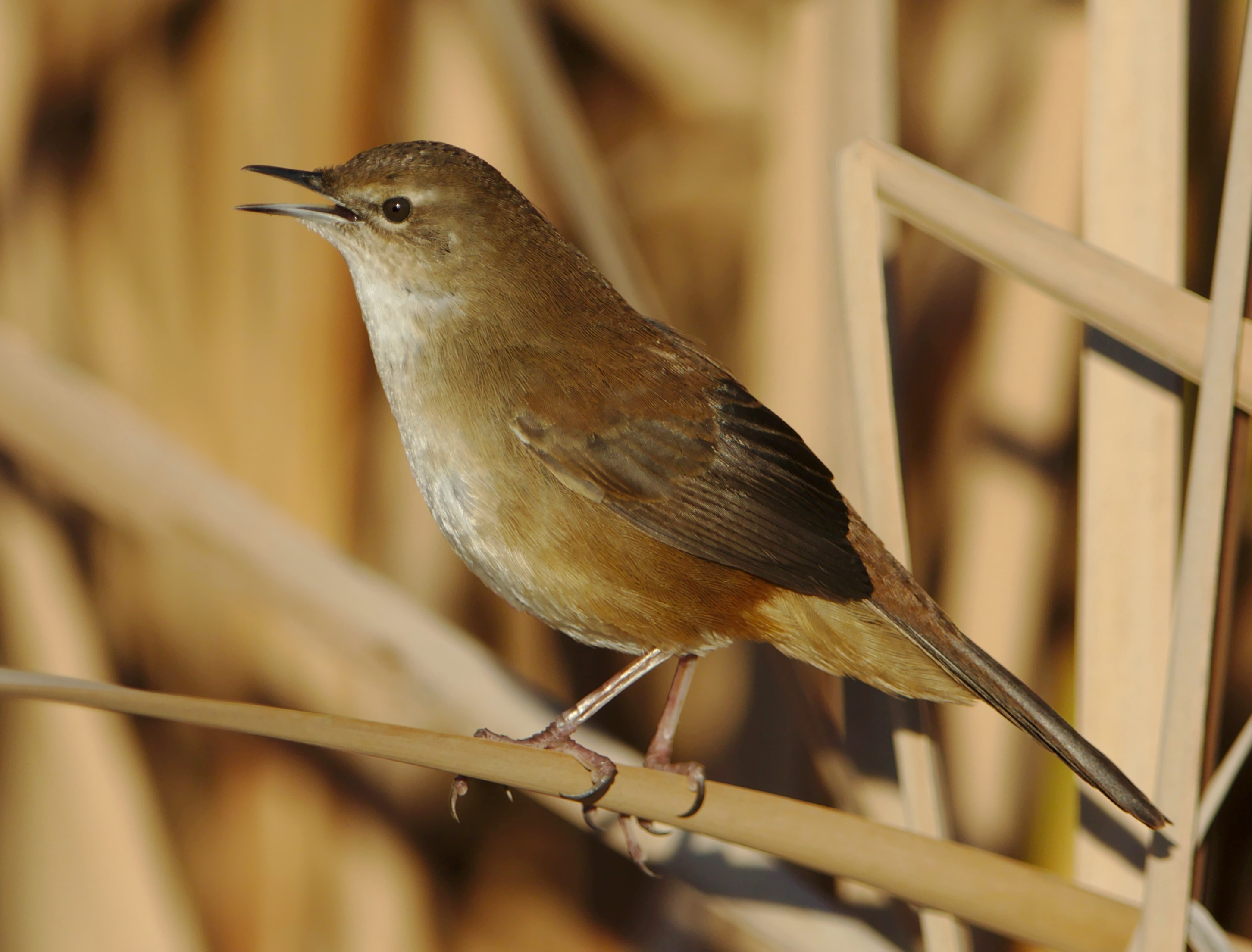
Little rush warbler

Order: Passeriformes Family: Locustellidae

Locustellidae are a family of small insectivorous songbirds found mainly in Eurasia, Africa, and the Australian region. They are smallish birds with tails that are usually long and pointed, and tend to be drab brownish or buffy all over.

- Fan-tailed grassbird, Catriscus brevirostris
- Evergreen-forest warbler, Bradypterus lopezi
- Little rush warbler, Bradypterus baboecala

== Swallows ==
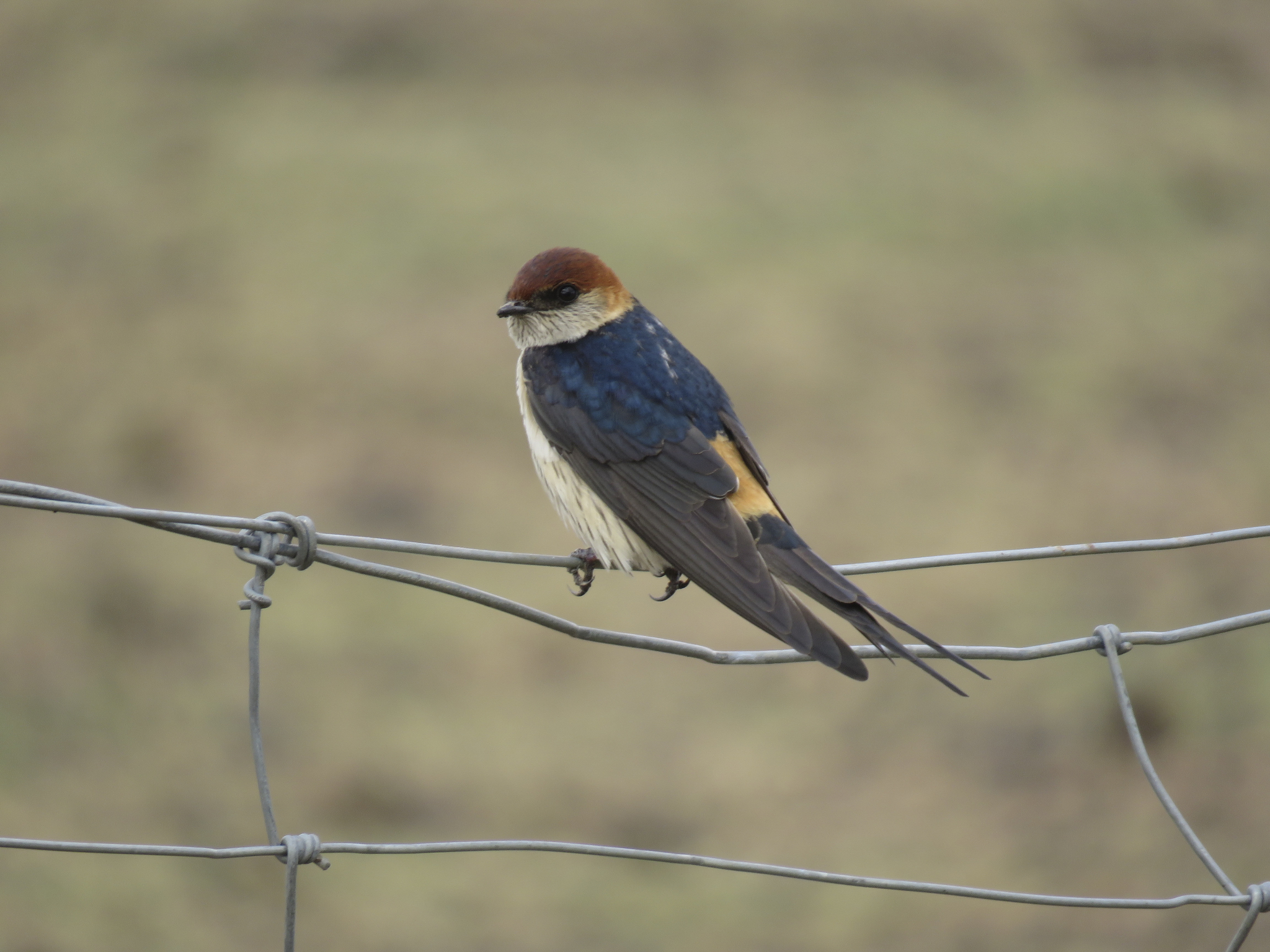
Greater striped swallow

Order: Passeriformes Family: Hirundinidae

The family Hirundinidae is adapted to aerial feeding. They have a slender streamlined body, long pointed wings and a short bill with a wide gape. The feet are adapted to perching rather than walking, and the front toes are partially joined at the base.

- Plain martin, Riparia paludicola
- Bank swallow, Riparia riparia
- Banded martin, Neophedina cincta
- Brazza's martin, Phedinopsis brazzae
- Rock martin, Ptyonoprogne fuligula
- Barn swallow, Hirundo rustica
- Angola swallow, Hirundo angolensis
- White-throated blue swallow, Hirundo nigrita
- White-throated swallow, Hirundo albigularis
- Wire-tailed swallow, Hirundo smithii
- Pearl-breasted swallow, Hirundo dimidiata
- Black-and-rufous swallow, Hirundo nigrorufa
- Greater striped swallow, Cecropis cucullata
- Lesser striped swallow, Cecropis abyssinica
- Rufous-chested swallow, Cecropis semirufa
- Mosque swallow, Cecropis senegalensis
- Red-throated swallow, Petrochelidon rufigula
- South African swallow, Petrochelidon spilodera (A)
- Forest swallow, Atronanus fuliginosus (A)
- Common house-martin, Delichon urbicum
- Square-tailed sawwing, Psalidoprocne nitens
- White-headed sawwing, Psalidoprocne albiceps
- Black sawwing, Psalidoprocne pristoptera
- Gray-rumped swallow, Pseudhirundo griseopyga

== Bulbuls ==
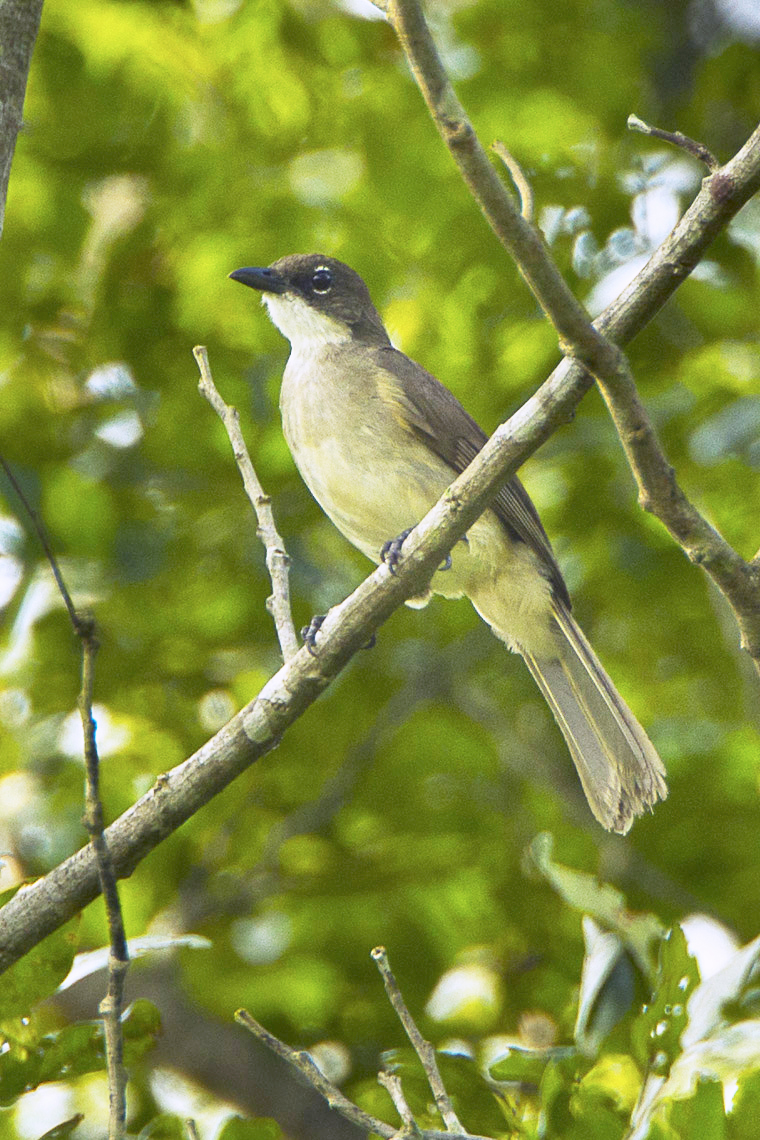
Simple greenbul

Order: Passeriformes Family: Pycnonotidae

Bulbuls are medium-sized songbirds. Some are colourful with yellow, red or orange vents, cheeks, throats or supercilia, but most are drab, with uniform olive-brown to black plumage. Some species have distinct crests.

- Slender-billed greenbul, Stelgidillas gracilirostris
- Golden greenbul, Calyptocichla serinus
- Black-collared bulbul, Neolestes torquatus
- Red-tailed bristlebill, Bleda syndactylus
- Lesser bristlebill, Bleda notatus
- Simple greenbul, Chlorocichla simplex
- Yellow-necked greenbul, Chlorocichla falkensteini
- Yellow-bellied greenbul, Chlorocichla flaviventris
- Honeyguide greenbul, Baeopogon indicator
- Yellow-throated greenbul, Atimastillas flavicollis
- Spotted greenbul, Ixonotus guttatus
- Swamp greenbul, Thescelocichla leucopleura
- Red-tailed greenbul, Criniger calurus
- Eastern bearded-greenbul, Criniger chloronotus
- White-bearded greenbul, Criniger ndussumensis
- Gray greenbul, Eurillas gracilis
- Ansorge's greenbul, Eurillas ansorgei
- Plain greenbul, Eurillas curvirostris
- Yellow-whiskered bulbul, Eurillas latirostris
- Little greenbul, Eurillas virens
- Leaf-love, Phyllastrephus scandens (A)
- Terrestrial brownbul, Phyllastrephus terrestris
- Pale-olive greenbul, Phyllastrephus fulviventris
- Gray-olive greenbul, Phyllastrephus cerviniventris
- Cabanis's greenbul, Phyllastrephus cabanisi
- Icterine greenbul, Phyllastrephus icterinus
- Xavier's greenbul, Phyllastrephus xavieri
- White-throated greenbul, Phyllastrephus albigularis
- Common bulbul, Pycnonotus barbatus
- Black-fronted bulbul, Pycnonotus nigricans

== Leaf warblers ==
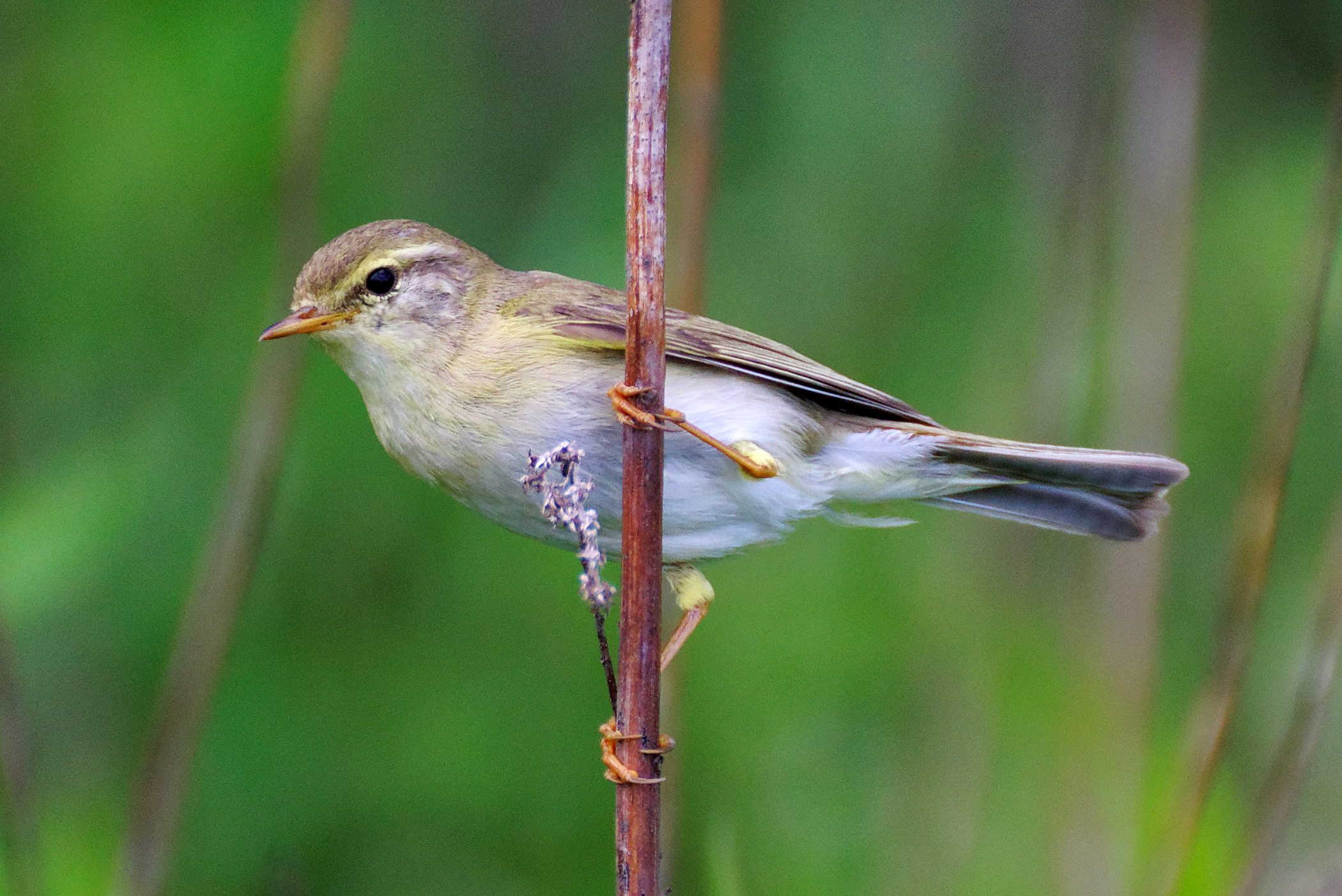
Willow warbler

Order: Passeriformes Family: Phylloscopidae

Leaf warblers are a family of small insectivorous birds found mostly in Eurasia and ranging into Wallacea and Africa. The species are of various sizes, often green-plumaged above and yellow below, or more subdued with grayish-green to grayish-brown colors.

- Wood warbler, Phylloscopus sibilatrix
- Willow warbler, Phylloscopus trochilus
- Laura's woodland-warbler, Phylloscopus laurae

== Bush warblers and allies ==
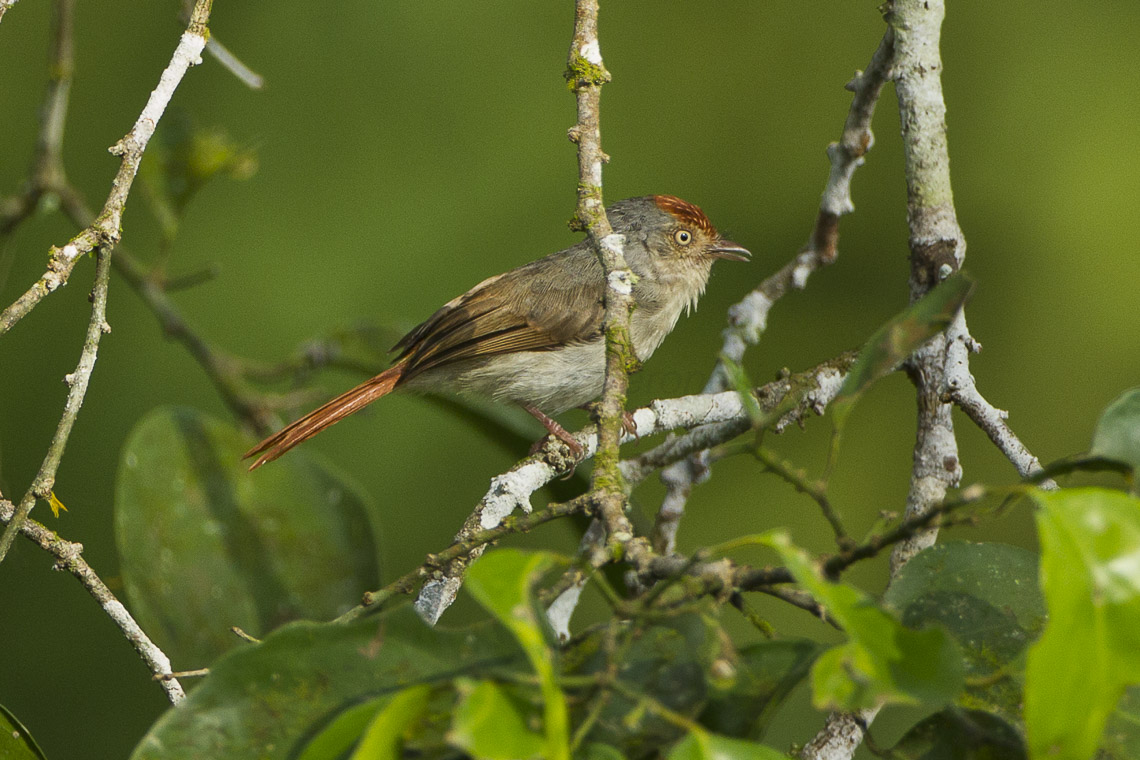
Chestnut-capped flycatcher

Order: Passeriformes Family: Scotocercidae

The members of this family are found throughout Africa, Asia, and Polynesia. Their taxonomy is in flux, and some authorities place genus Erythrocerus in another family.

- Chestnut-capped flycatcher, Erythrocercus mccallii

== Sylviid warblers, parrotbills, and allies ==
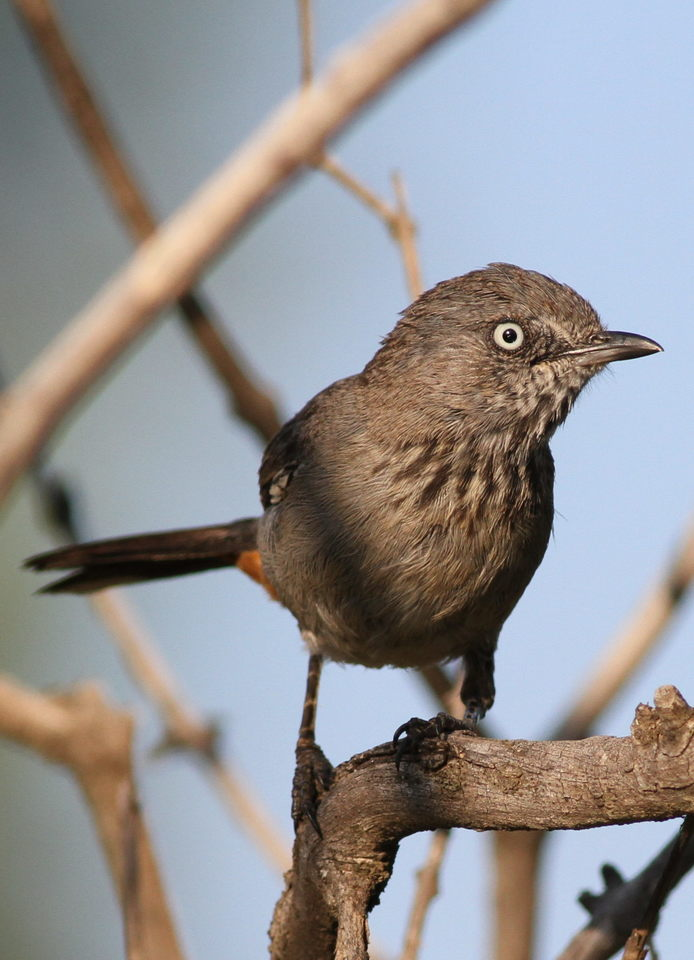
Chestnut-vented warbler

Order: Passeriformes Family: Sylviidae

The family Sylviidae is a group of small insectivorous passerine birds. They mainly occur as breeding species, as the common name implies, in Europe, Asia and, to a lesser extent, Africa. Most are of generally undistinguished appearance, but many have distinctive songs.

- Garden warbler, Sylvia borin
- African hill babbler, Sylvia abyssinica
- Chestnut-vented warbler, Curruca subcoerulea
- Greater whitethroat, Curruca communis (A)

== White-eyes, yuhinas, and allies ==
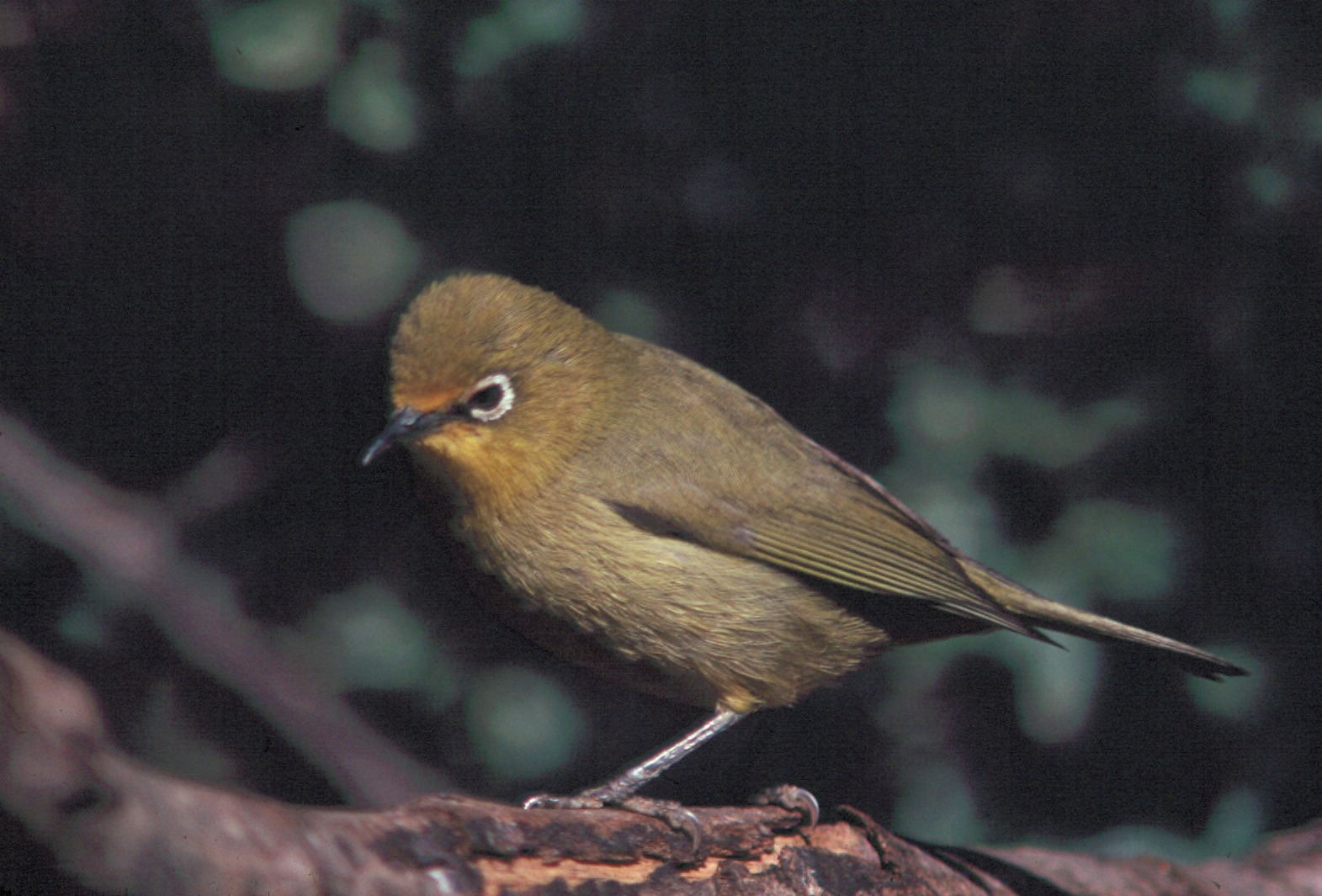
Orange River white-eye

Order: Passeriformes Family: Zosteropidae

The white-eyes are small and mostly undistinguished, their plumage above being generally some dull colour like greenish-olive, but some species have a white or bright yellow throat, breast or lower parts, and several have buff flanks. As their name suggests, many species have a white ring around each eye.

- Northern yellow white-eye, Zosterops senegalensis
- Orange River white-eye, Zosterops pallidus
- Southern yellow white-eye, Zosterops anderssoni

== Ground babblers and allies ==
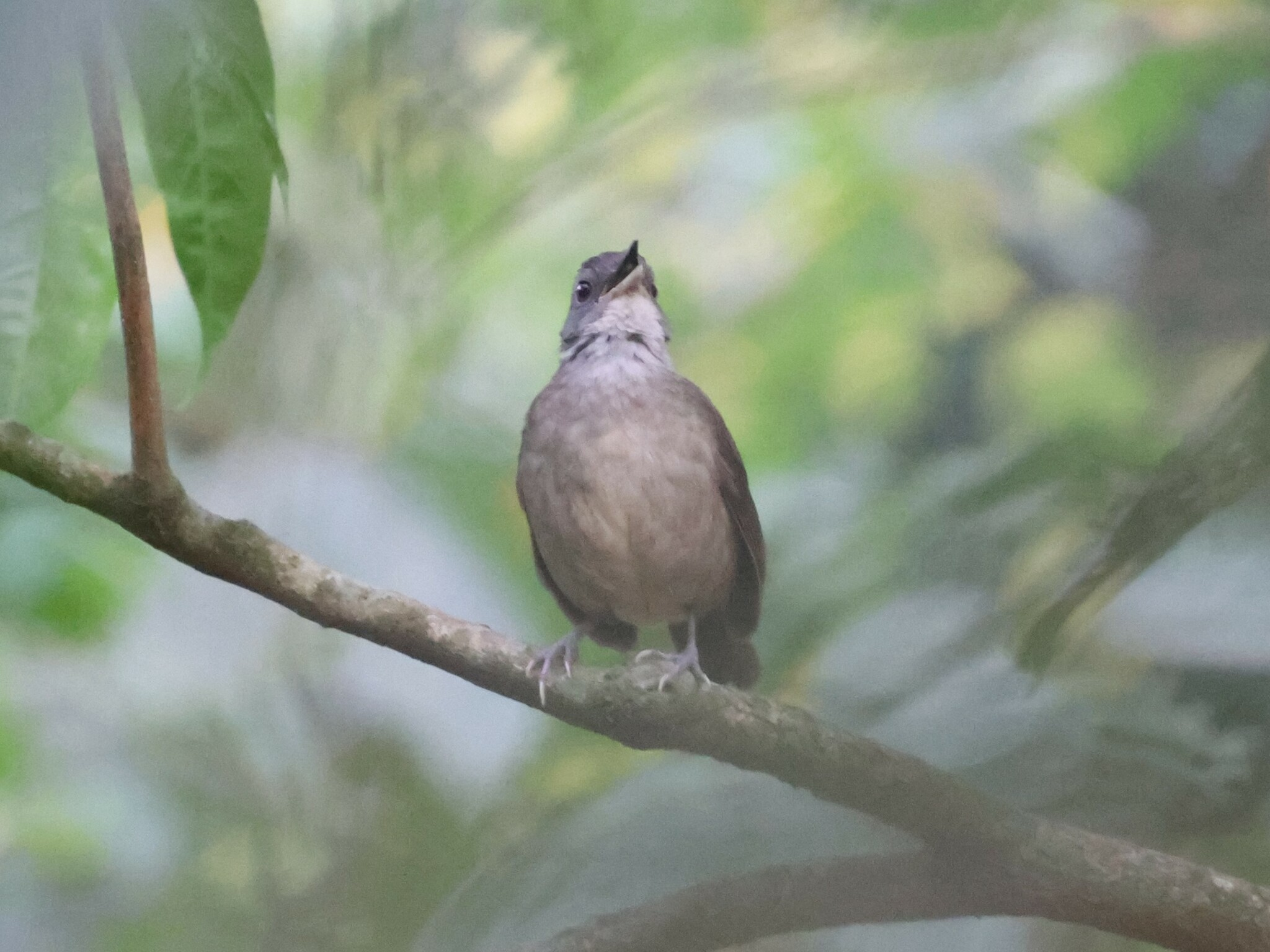
Scaly-breasted illadopsis

Order: Passeriformes Family: Pellorneidae

These small to medium-sized songbirds have soft fluffy plumage but are otherwise rather diverse. Members of the genus Illadopsis are found in forests, but some other genera are birds of scrublands.

- Brown illadopsis, Illadopsis fulvescens
- Pale-breasted illadopsis, Illadopsis rufipennis
- Scaly-breasted illadopsis, Illadopsis albipectus
- Thrush babbler, Illadopsis turdina

== Laughingthrushes and allies ==
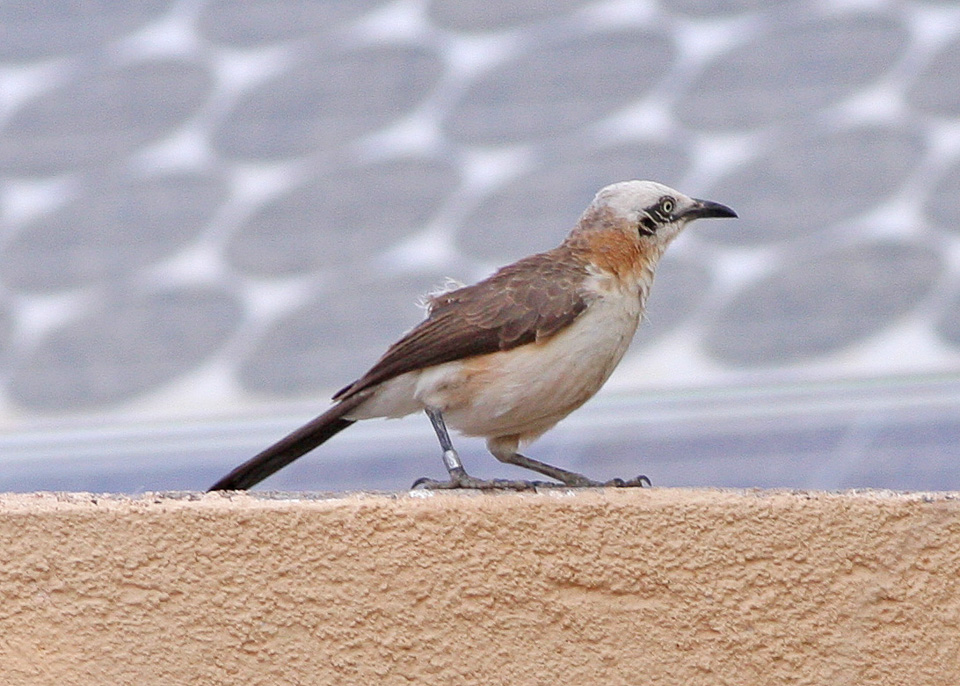
Bare-cheeked babbler

Order: Passeriformes Family: Leiothrichidae

The members of this family are diverse in size and colouration, though those of genus Turdoides tend to be brown or greyish. The family is found in Africa, India, and southeast Asia.

- Arrow-marked babbler, Turdoides jardineii
- Bare-cheeked babbler, Turdoides gymnogenys
- Hartlaub's babbler, Turdoides hartlaubii
- Black-faced babbler, Turdoides melanops

== Treecreepers ==
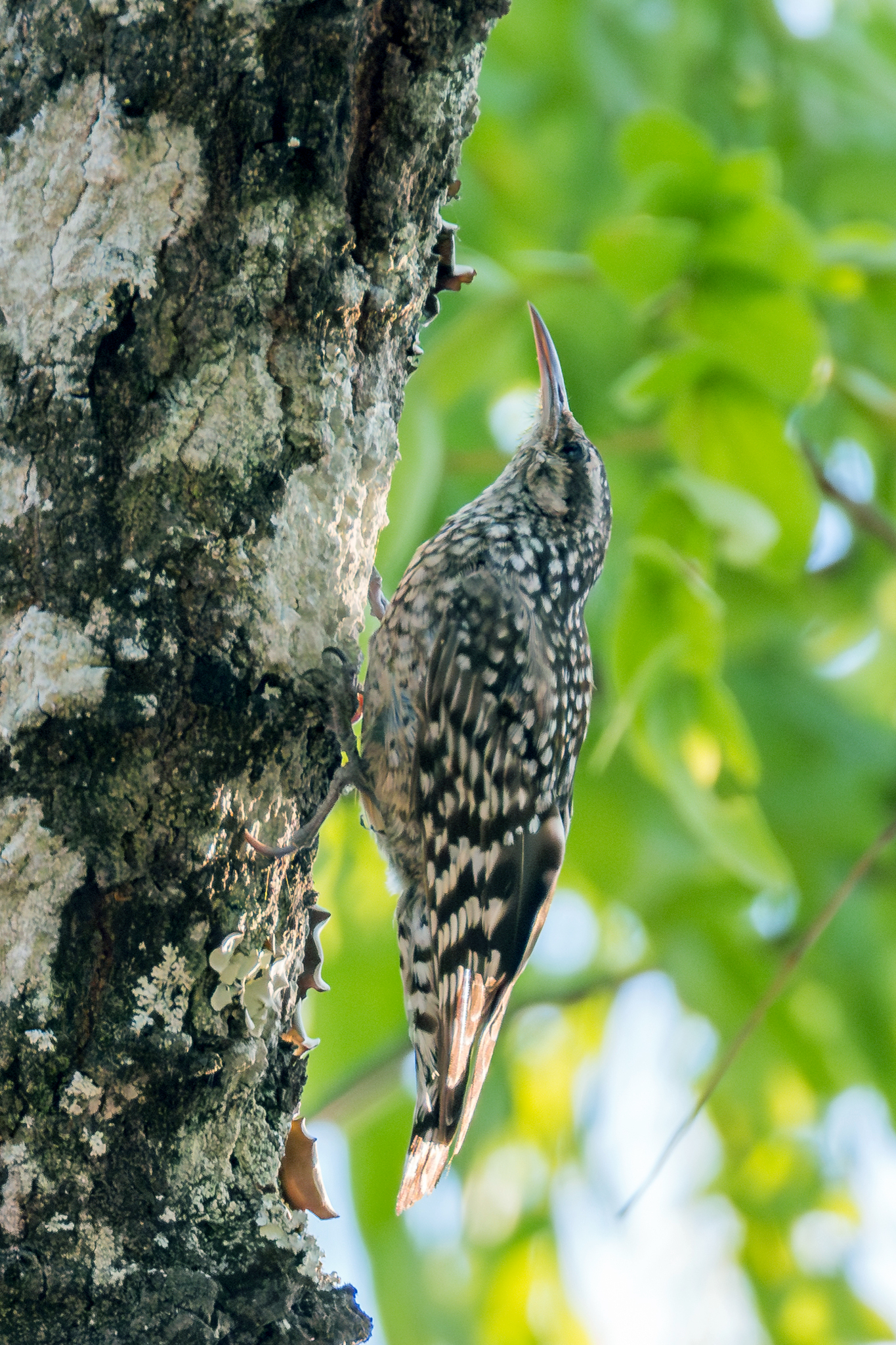
African spotted creeper

Order: Passeriformes Family: Certhiidae

Treecreepers are small woodland birds, brown above and white below. They have thin pointed down-curved bills, which they use to extricate insects from bark. They have stiff tail feathers, like woodpeckers, which they use to support themselves on vertical trees.

- African spotted creeper, Salpornis salvadori

== Oxpeckers ==
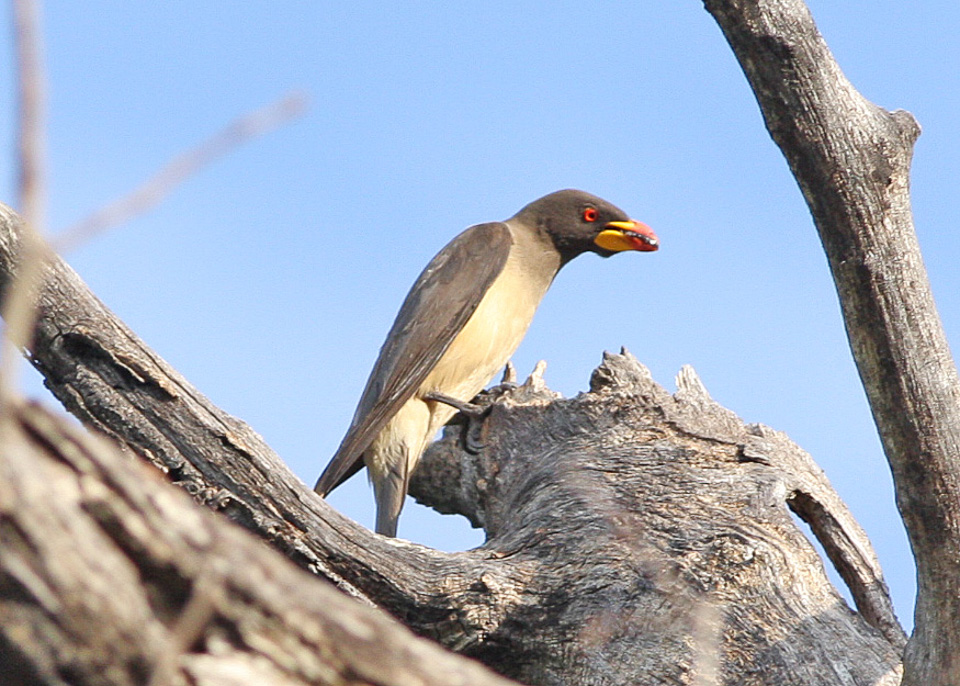
Yellow-billed oxpecker

Order: Passeriformes Family: Buphagidae

As both the English and scientific names of these birds imply, they feed on ectoparasites, primarily ticks, found on large mammals.

- Red-billed oxpecker, Buphagus erythrorynchus
- Yellow-billed oxpecker, Buphagus africanus

== Starlings ==
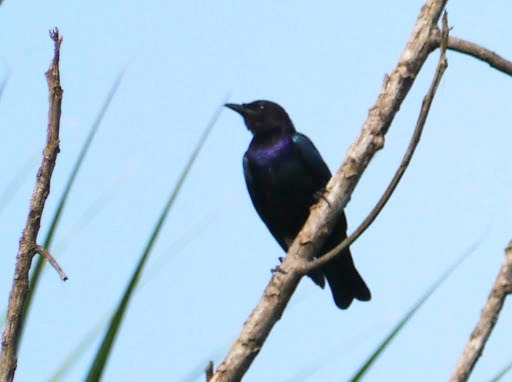
Purple-headed starling

Order: Passeriformes Family: Sturnidae

Starlings are small to medium-sized passerine birds. Their flight is strong and direct and they are very gregarious. Their preferred habitat is fairly open country. They eat insects and fruit. Plumage is typically dark with a metallic sheen.

- Wattled starling, Creatophora cinerea
- Violet-backed starling, Cinnyricinclus leucogaster
- Pale-winged starling, Onychognathus nabouroup
- Chestnut-winged starling, Onychognathus fulgidus
- Babbling starling, Neocichla gutturalis
- Narrow-tailed starling, Poeoptera lugubris
- Purple-headed starling, Hylopsar purpureiceps
- Burchell's starling, Lamprotornis australis
- Meves's starling, Lamprotornis mevesii
- Splendid starling, Lamprotornis splendidus
- Sharp-tailed starling, Lamprotornis acuticaudus
- Greater blue-eared starling, Lamprotornis chalybaeus
- Cape starling, Lamprotornis nitens

== Thrushes and allies ==
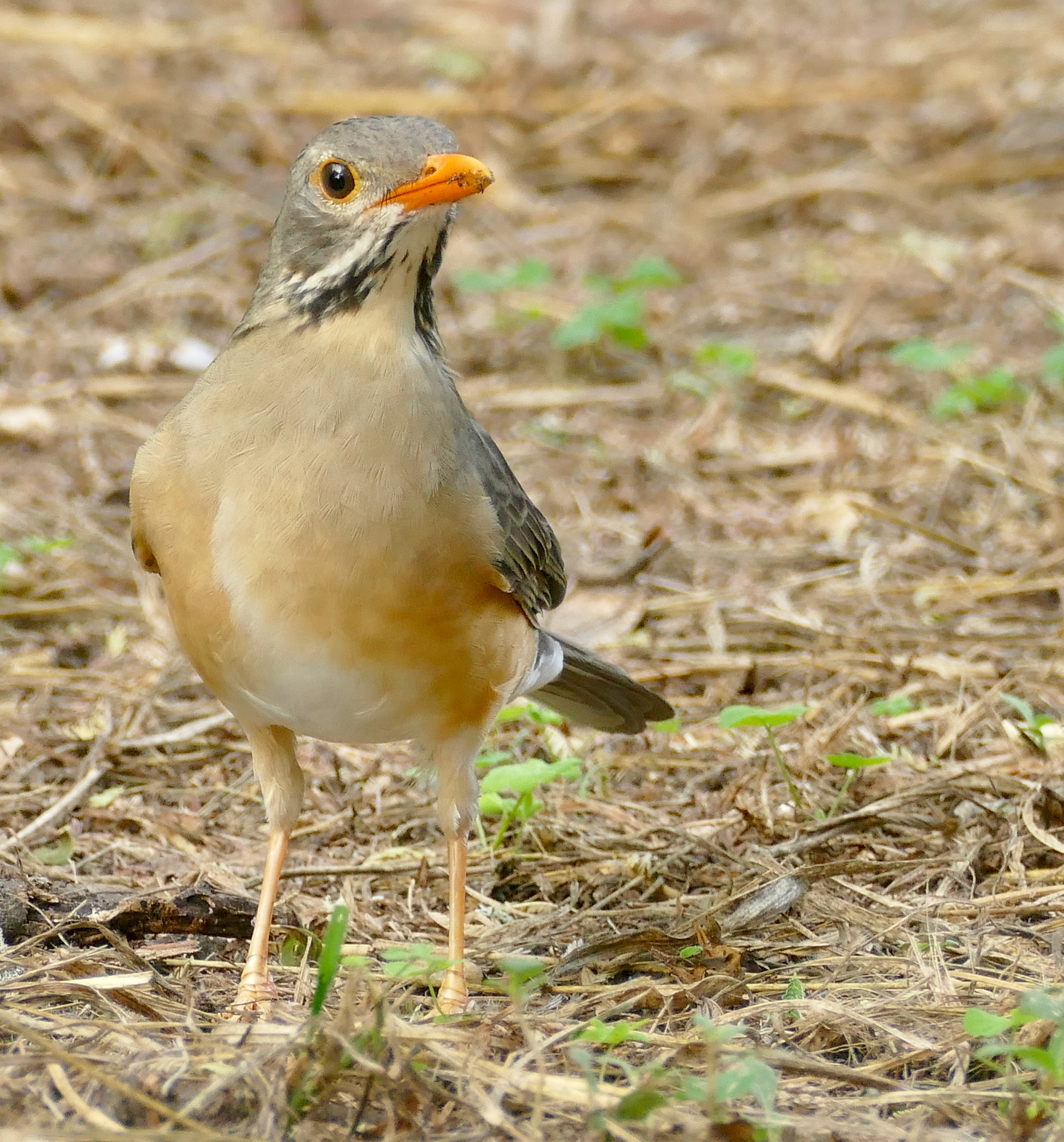
Kurrichane thrush

Order: Passeriformes Family: Turdidae

The thrushes are a group of passerine birds that occur mainly in the Old World. They are plump, soft plumaged, small to medium-sized insectivores or sometimes omnivores, often feeding on the ground. Many have attractive songs.

- Rufous flycatcher-thrush, Neocossyphus fraseri
- White-tailed ant-thrush, Neocossyphus poensis
- Orange ground-thrush, Geokichla gurneyi
- Groundscraper thrush, Turdus litsitsirupa
- Kurrichane thrush, Turdus libonyana
- Olive thrush, Turdus olivaceus
- African thrush, Turdus pelios

== Old World flycatchers ==
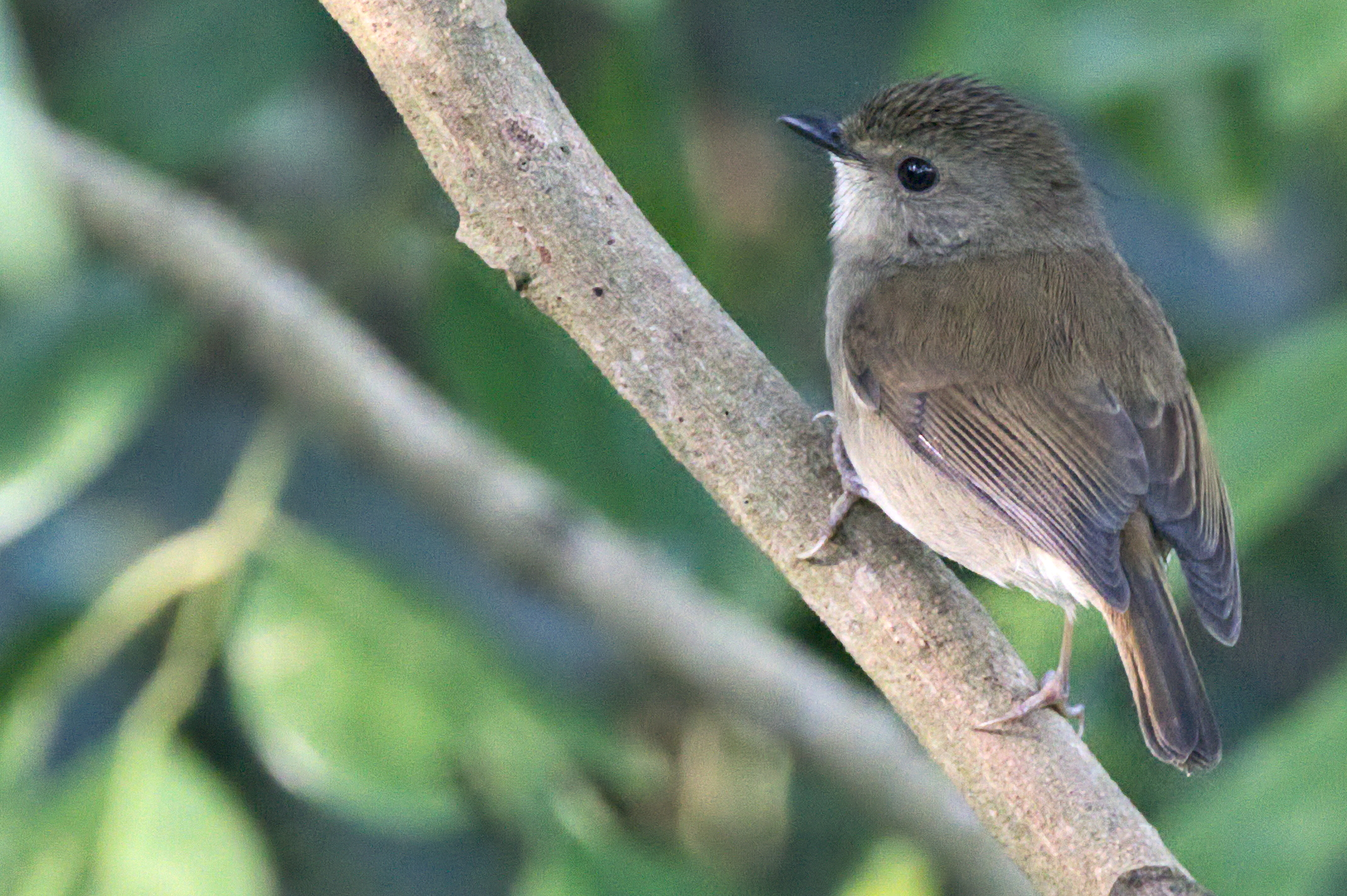
Gabela akalat

Order: Passeriformes Family: Muscicapidae

Old World flycatchers are a large group of small passerine birds native to the Old World. They are mainly small arboreal insectivores. The appearance of these birds is highly varied, but they mostly have weak songs and harsh calls.

- African dusky flycatcher, Muscicapa adusta
- Little flycatcher, Muscicapa epulata
- Spotted flycatcher, Muscicapa striata
- Cassin's flycatcher, Muscicapa cassini
- Böhm's flycatcher, Bradornis boehmi
- Sooty flycatcher, Bradornis fuliginosus
- Dusky-blue flycatcher, Bradornis comitatus
- Mariqua flycatcher, Bradornis mariquensis
- Pale flycatcher, Agricola pallidus
- Chat flycatcher, Agricola infuscatus
- White-browed forest-flycatcher, Fraseria cinerascens
- African forest-flycatcher, Fraseria ocreata
- Gray-throated tit-flycatcher, Fraseria griseigularis
- Gray tit-flycatcher, Fraseria plumbea
- Ashy flycatcher, Fraseria caerulescens
- Herero chat, Melaenornis herero
- Southern black-flycatcher, Melaenornis pammelaina
- Angola slaty-flycatcher, Melaenornis brunneus (E)
- Fire-crested alethe, Alethe castanea
- Forest scrub-robin, Cercotrichas leucosticta
- Bearded scrub-robin, Cercotrichas quadrivirgata
- Miombo scrub-robin, Cercotrichas barbata
- Kalahari scrub-robin, Cercotrichas paena
- Brown-backed scrub-robin, Cercotrichas hartlaubi
- Red-backed scrub-robin, Cercotrichas leucophrys
- Gray-winged robin-chat, Cossypha polioptera
- White-browed robin-chat, Cossypha heuglini
- Red-capped robin-chat, Cossypha natalensis
- White-headed robin-chat, Cossypha heinrichi
- Snowy-crowned robin-chat, Cossypha niveicapilla
- Angola cave-chat, Xenocopsychus ansorgei (E)
- Collared palm-thrush, Cichladusa arquata
- Rufous-tailed palm-thrush, Cichladusa ruficauda
- Brown-chested alethe, Chamaetylas poliocephala
- Bocage's akalat, Sheppardia bocagei
- Gabela akalat, Sheppardia gabela (E)
- European pied flycatcher, Ficedula hypoleuca
- Collared flycatcher, Ficedula albicollis (A)
- Common redstart, Phoenicurus phoenicurus
- Short-toed rock-thrush, Monticola brevipes
- Miombo rock-thrush, Monticola angolensis
- African stonechat, Saxicola torquatus
- Karoo chat, Emarginata schlegelii
- Tractrac chat, Emarginata tractrac
- Sooty chat, Myrmecocichla nigra
- Southern anteater-chat, Myrmecocichla formicivora
- Congo moor chat, Myrmecocichla tholloni
- Mountain wheatear, Myrmecocichla monticola
- Arnot's chat, Myrmecocichla arnotti
- Northern wheatear, Oenanthe oenanthe
- Capped wheatear, Oenanthe pileata
- Isabelline wheatear, Oenanthe isabellina
- White-fronted black-chat, Oenanthe albifrons
- Familiar chat, Oenanthe familiaris

== Sunbirds and spiderhunters ==
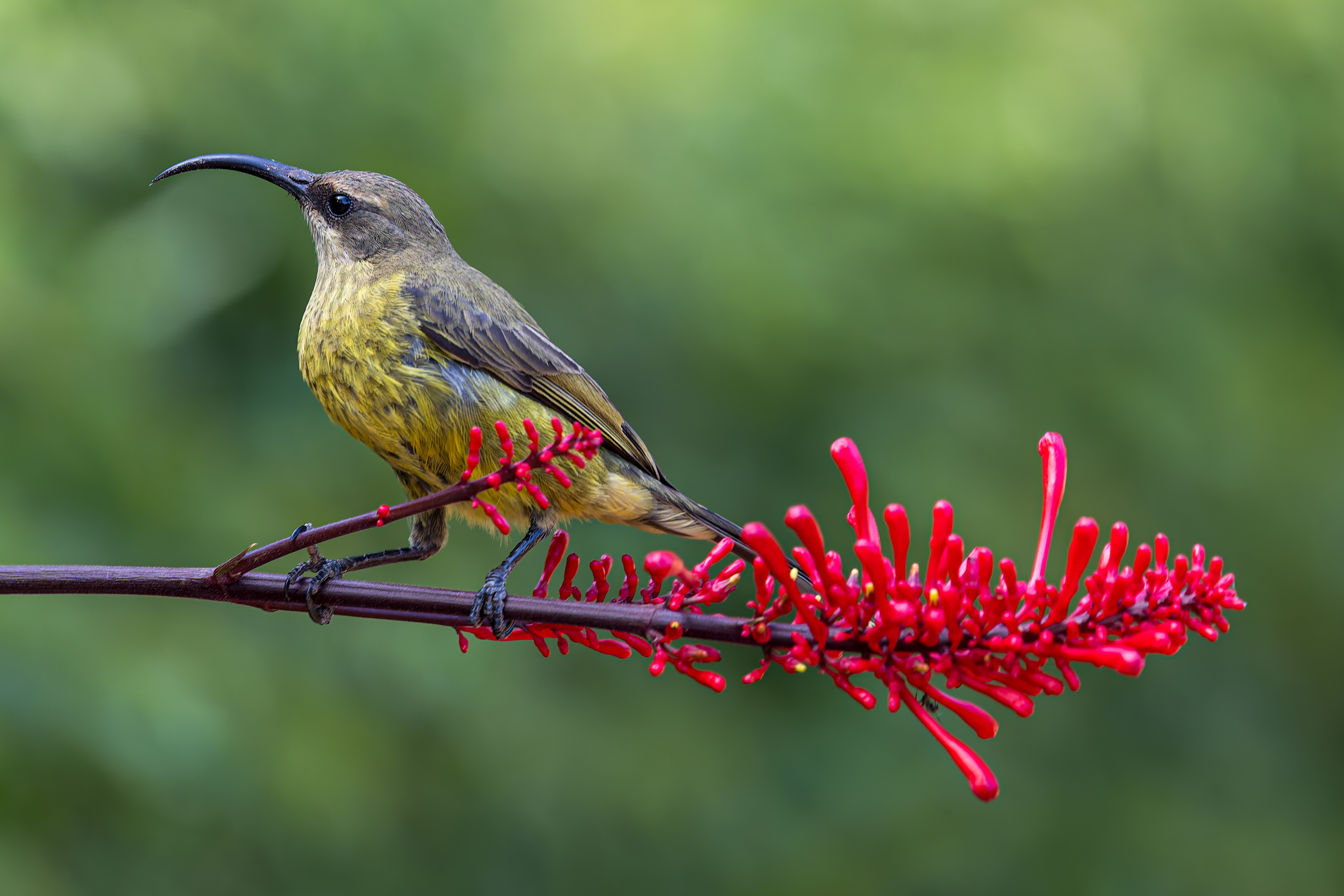
Bronze sunbird

Order: Passeriformes Family: Nectariniidae

The sunbirds and spiderhunters are very small passerine birds which feed largely on nectar, although they will also take insects, especially when feeding young. Flight is fast and direct on their short wings. Most species can take nectar by hovering like a hummingbird, but usually perch to feed.

- Fraser's sunbird, Deleornis fraseri
- Anchieta's sunbird, Anthreptes anchietae
- Mouse-brown sunbird, Anthreptes gabonicus
- Western violet-backed sunbird, Anthreptes longuemarei
- Violet-tailed sunbird, Anthreptes aurantius
- Little green sunbird, Anthreptes seimundi
- Green sunbird, Anthreptes rectirostris
- Collared sunbird, Hedydipna collaris
- Reichenbach's sunbird, Anabathmis reichenbachii
- Green-headed sunbird, Cyanomitra verticalis
- Bannerman's sunbird, Cyanomitra bannermani
- Blue-throated brown sunbird, Cyanomitra cyanolaema
- Olive sunbird, Cyanomitra olivacea
- Carmelite sunbird, Chalcomitra fuliginosa
- Green-throated sunbird, Chalcomitra rubescens
- Amethyst sunbird, Chalcomitra amethystina
- Scarlet-chested sunbird, Chalcomitra senegalensis
- Bocage's sunbird, Nectarinia bocagii
- Bronze sunbird, Nectarinia kilimensis
- Olive-bellied sunbird, Cinnyris chloropygius
- Western miombo sunbird, Cinnyris gertrudis
- Eastern miombo sunbird, Cinnyris manoensis
- Montane double-collared sunbird, Cinnyris ludovicensis
- Greater double-collared sunbird, Cinnyris afer
- Mariqua sunbird, Cinnyris mariquensis
- Shelley's sunbird, Cinnyris shelleyi
- Purple-banded sunbird, Cinnyris bifasciatus
- Orange-tufted sunbird, Cinnyris bouvieri
- Splendid sunbird, Cinnyris coccinigaster
- Johanna's sunbird, Cinnyris johannae
- Superb sunbird, Cinnyris superbus
- Oustalet's sunbird, Cinnyris oustaleti
- White-breasted sunbird, Cinnyris talatala
- Variable sunbird, Cinnyris venustus
- Dusky sunbird, Cinnyris fuscus
- Bates's sunbird, Cinnyris batesi
- Copper sunbird, Cinnyris cupreus

== Weavers and allies ==
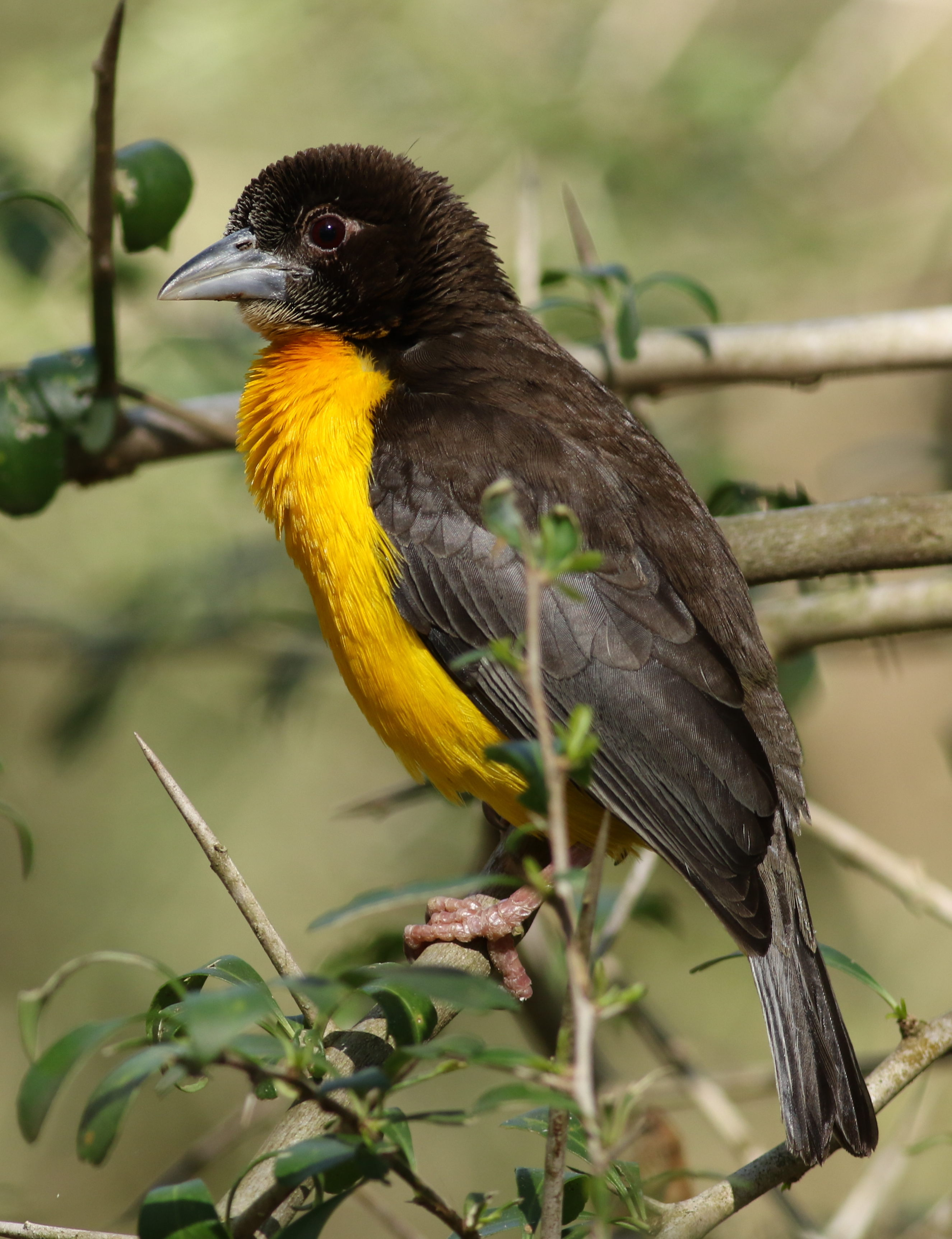
Forest weaver

Order: Passeriformes Family: Ploceidae

The weavers are small passerine birds related to the finches. They are seed-eating birds with rounded conical bills. The males of many species are brightly coloured, usually in red or yellow and black, some species show variation in colour only in the breeding season.

- Red-billed buffalo-weaver, Bubalornis niger
- Scaly weaver, Sporopipes squamifrons
- White-browed sparrow-weaver, Plocepasser mahali
- Chestnut-crowned sparrow-weaver, Plocepasser superciliosus
- Chestnut-backed sparrow-weaver, Plocepasser rufoscapulatus
- Sociable weaver, Philetairus socius
- Black-throated malimbe, Malimbus cassini
- Blue-billed malimbe, Malimbus nitens
- Crested malimbe, Malimbus malimbicus
- Red-headed malimbe, Malimbus rubricollis
- Red-headed weaver, Anaplectes rubriceps
- Black-chinned weaver, Ploceus nigrimentum
- Slender-billed weaver, Ploceus pelzelni
- Loango weaver, Ploceus subpersonatus
- Black-necked weaver, Ploceus nigricollis
- Spectacled weaver, Ploceus ocularis
- Bocage's weaver, Ploceus temporalis
- Holub's golden weaver, Ploceus xanthops
- Orange weaver, Ploceus aurantius
- Southern brown-throated weaver, Ploceus xanthopterus
- Lesser masked-weaver, Ploceus intermedius
- Southern masked-weaver, Ploceus velatus
- Vieillot's black weaver, Ploceus nigerrimus
- Village weaver, Ploceus cucullatus
- Chestnut weaver, Ploceus rubiginosus
- Yellow-mantled weaver, Ploceus tricolor
- Forest weaver, Ploceus bicolor
- Brown-capped weaver, Ploceus insignis
- Preuss's weaver, Ploceus preussi
- Bar-winged weaver, Ploceus angolensis
- Compact weaver, Pachyphantes superciliosus
- Red-headed quelea, Quelea erythrops
- Red-billed quelea, Quelea quelea
- Bob-tailed weaver, Brachycope anomala (A)
- Southern red bishop, Euplectes orix
- Black-winged bishop, Euplectes hordeaceus
- Black bishop, Euplectes gierowii
- Yellow-crowned bishop, Euplectes afer
- Golden-backed bishop, Euplectes aureus
- Yellow bishop, Euplectes capensis
- White-winged widowbird, Euplectes albonotatus
- Yellow-mantled widowbird, Euplectes macroura
- Red-collared widowbird, Euplectes ardens
- Fan-tailed widowbird, Euplectes axillaris
- Marsh widowbird, Euplectes hartlaubi
- Long-tailed widowbird, Euplectes progne
- Grosbeak weaver, Amblyospiza albifrons

== Waxbills and allies ==
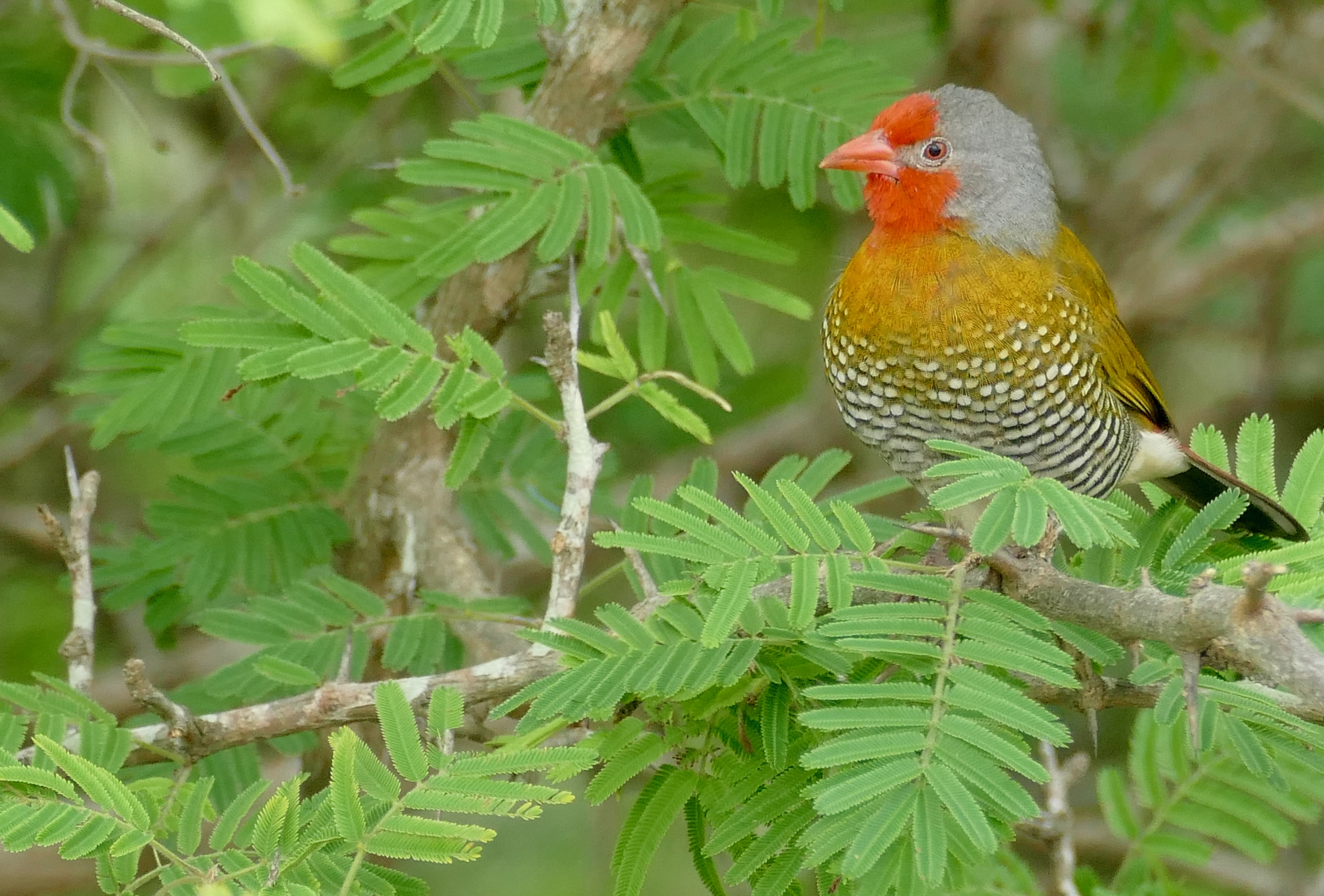
Green-winged pytilia

Order: Passeriformes Family: Estrildidae

The estrildid finches are small passerine birds of the Old World tropics and Australasia. They are gregarious and often colonial seed eaters with short thick but pointed bills. They are all similar in structure and habits, but have wide variation in plumage colours and patterns.

- Bronze mannikin, Spermestes cucullatus
- Magpie mannikin, Spermestes fringilloides
- Black-and-white mannikin, Spermestes bicolor
- White-collared oliveback, Nesocharis ansorgei
- Yellow-bellied waxbill, Coccopygia quartinia
- Angola waxbill, Coccopygia bocagei (E)
- Green-backed twinspot, Mandingoa nitidula
- Red-faced crimsonwing, Cryptospiza reichenovii
- Woodhouse's antpecker, Parmoptila woodhousei
- White-breasted nigrita, Nigrita fusconota
- Chestnut-breasted nigrita, Nigrita bicolor
- Gray-headed nigrita, Nigrita canicapilla
- Pale-fronted nigrita, Nigrita luteifrons
- Black-faced waxbill, Brunhilda erythronotos
- Black-tailed waxbill, Glaucestrilda perreini
- Cinderella waxbill, Glaucestrilda thomensis
- Black-headed waxbill, Estrilda atricapilla
- Orange-cheeked waxbill, Estrilda melpoda
- Fawn-breasted waxbill, Estrilda paludicola
- Common waxbill, Estrilda astrild
- Quailfinch, Ortygospiza atricollis
- Locustfinch, Paludipasser locustella
- Cut-throat, Amadina fasciata
- Red-headed finch, Amadina erythrocephala
- Zebra waxbill, Amandava subflava
- Violet-eared waxbill, Granatina granatina
- Southern cordonbleu, Uraeginthus angolensis
- Red-cheeked cordonbleu, Uraeginthus bengalus
- Western bluebill, Spermophaga haematina
- Red-headed bluebill, Spermophaga ruficapilla
- Black-bellied seedcracker, Pyrenestes ostrinus
- Green-winged pytilia, Pytilia melba
- Orange-winged pytilia, Pytilia afra
- Dusky twinspot, Euschistospiza cinereovinacea
- Peters's twinspot, Hypargos niveoguttatus
- Brown twinspot, Clytospiza monteiri
- Red-billed firefinch, Lagonosticta senegala
- African firefinch, Lagonosticta rubricata
- Jameson's firefinch, Lagonosticta rhodopareia
- Brown firefinch, Lagonosticta nitidula

== Indigobirds ==
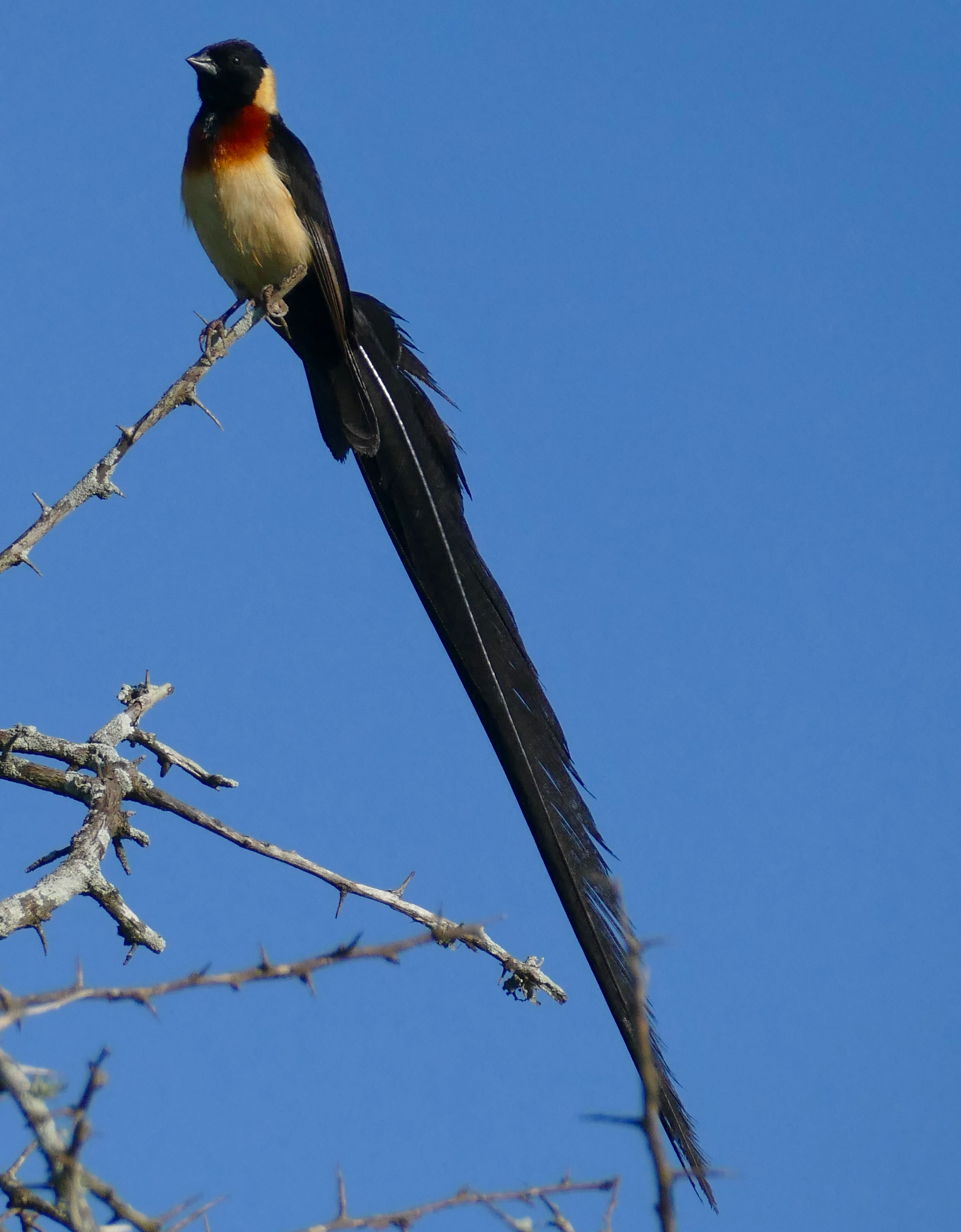
Eastern paradise-whydah

Order: Passeriformes Family: Viduidae

The indigobirds are finch-like species which usually have black or indigo predominating in their plumage. All are brood parasites, which lay their eggs in the nests of estrildid finches.

- Pin-tailed whydah, Vidua macroura
- Broad-tailed paradise-whydah, Vidua obtusa
- Eastern paradise-whydah, Vidua paradisaea
- Shaft-tailed whydah, Vidua regia
- Village indigobird, Vidua chalybeata
- Variable indigobird, Vidua funerea
- Purple indigobird, Vidua purpurascens
- Parasitic weaver, Anomalospiza imberbis

== Old World sparrows ==
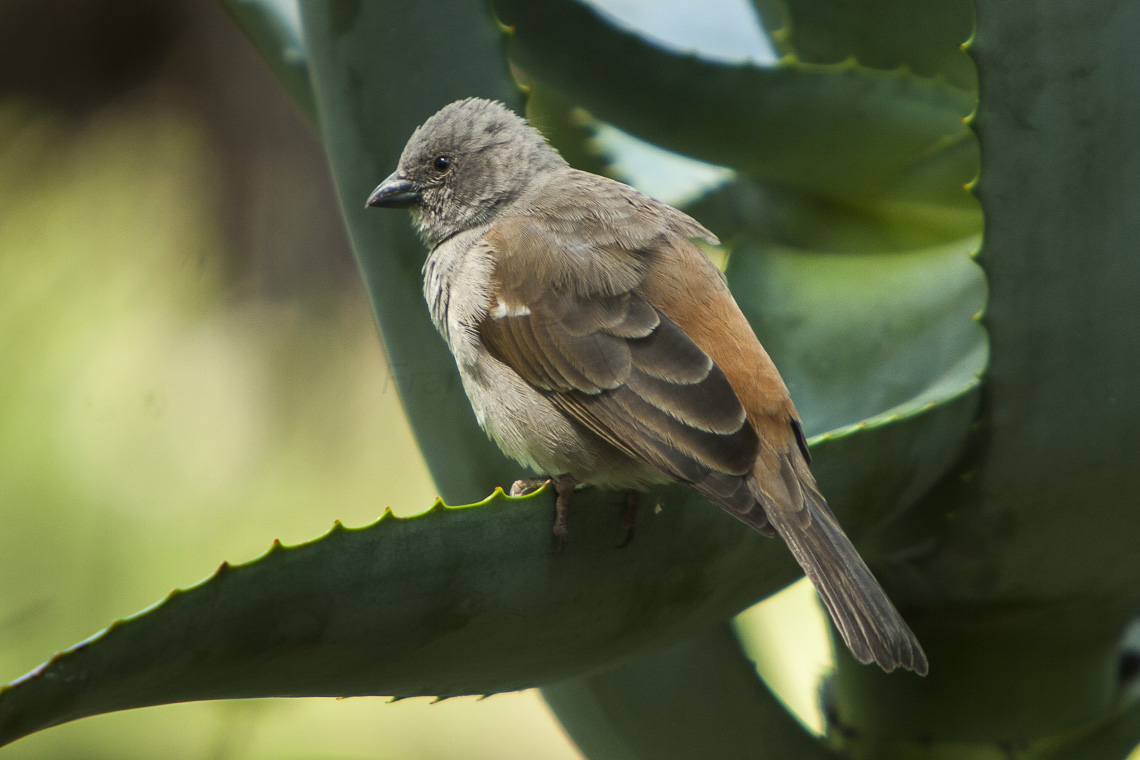
Northern gray-headed sparrow

Order: Passeriformes Family: Passeridae

Old World sparrows are small passerine birds. In general, sparrows tend to be small, plump, brown or grey birds with short tails and short powerful beaks. Sparrows are seed eaters, but they also consume small insects.

- House sparrow, Passer domesticus
- Great rufous sparrow, Passer motitensis
- Cape sparrow, Passer melanurus
- Northern gray-headed sparrow, Passer griseus
- Southern gray-headed sparrow, Passer diffusus
- Yellow-throated bush sparrow, Gymnoris superciliaris

== Wagtails and pipits ==
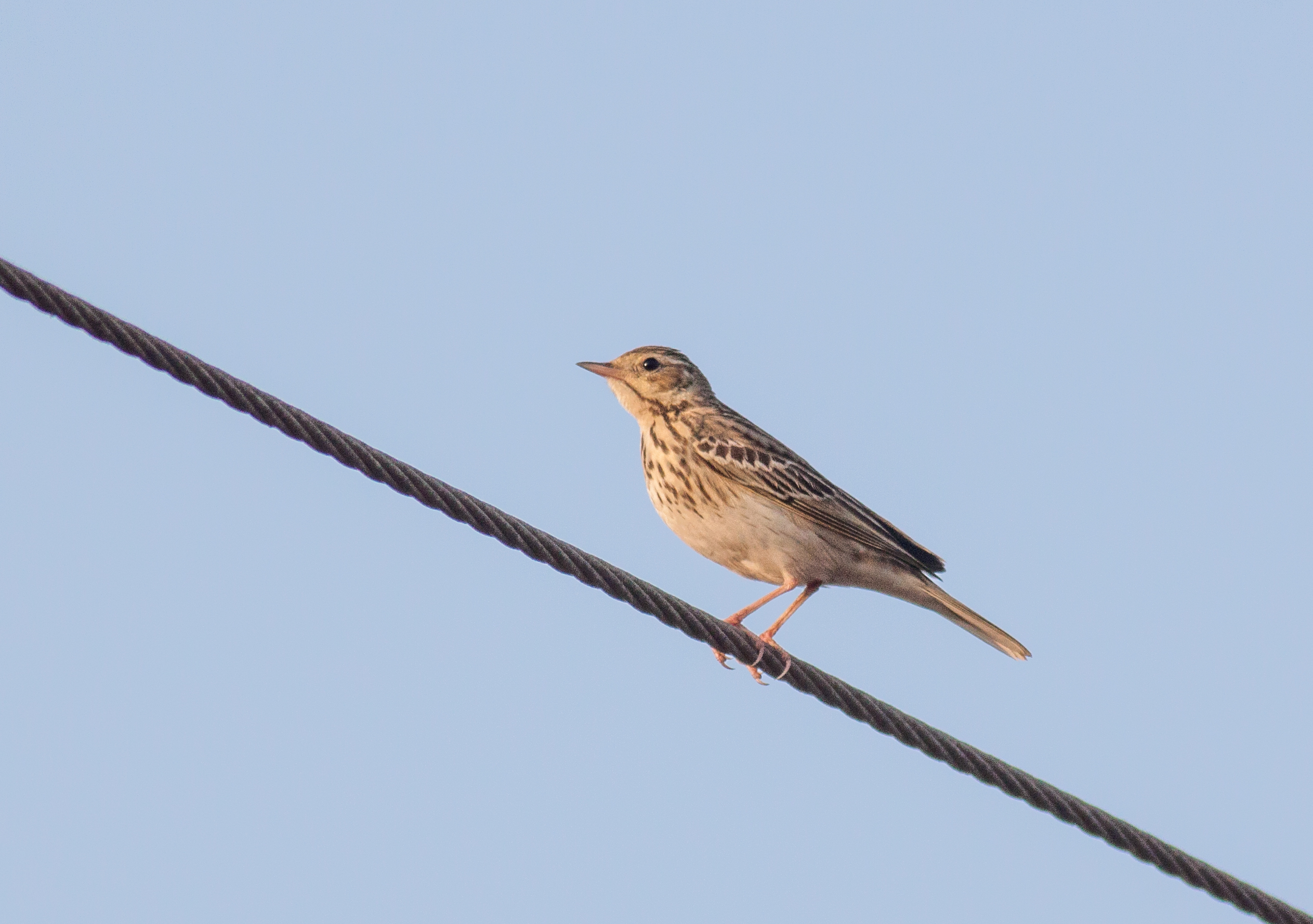
Tree pipit

Order: Passeriformes Family: Motacillidae

Motacillidae is a family of small passerine birds with medium to long tails. They include the wagtails, longclaws and pipits. They are slender, ground feeding insectivores of open country.

- Cape wagtail, Motacilla capensis
- Mountain wagtail, Motacilla clara
- Western yellow wagtail, Motacilla flava
- African pied wagtail, Motacilla aguimp
- White wagtail, Motacilla alba
- African pipit, Anthus cinnamomeus
- Woodland pipit, Anthus nyassae
- Long-billed pipit, Anthus similis
- Nicholson's pipit, Anthus nicholsoni
- Plain-backed pipit, Anthus leucophrys
- Buffy pipit, Anthus vaalensis
- Long-legged pipit, Anthus pallidiventris
- Striped pipit, Anthus lineiventris
- Tree pipit, Anthus trivialis
- Short-tailed pipit, Anthus brachyurus
- Bush pipit, Anthus caffer
- Yellow-throated longclaw, Macronyx croceus
- Fülleborn's longclaw, Macronyx fuellebornii
- Rosy-throated longclaw, Macronyx ameliae
- Grimwood's longclaw, Macronyx grimwoodi

== Finches, euphonias, and allies ==
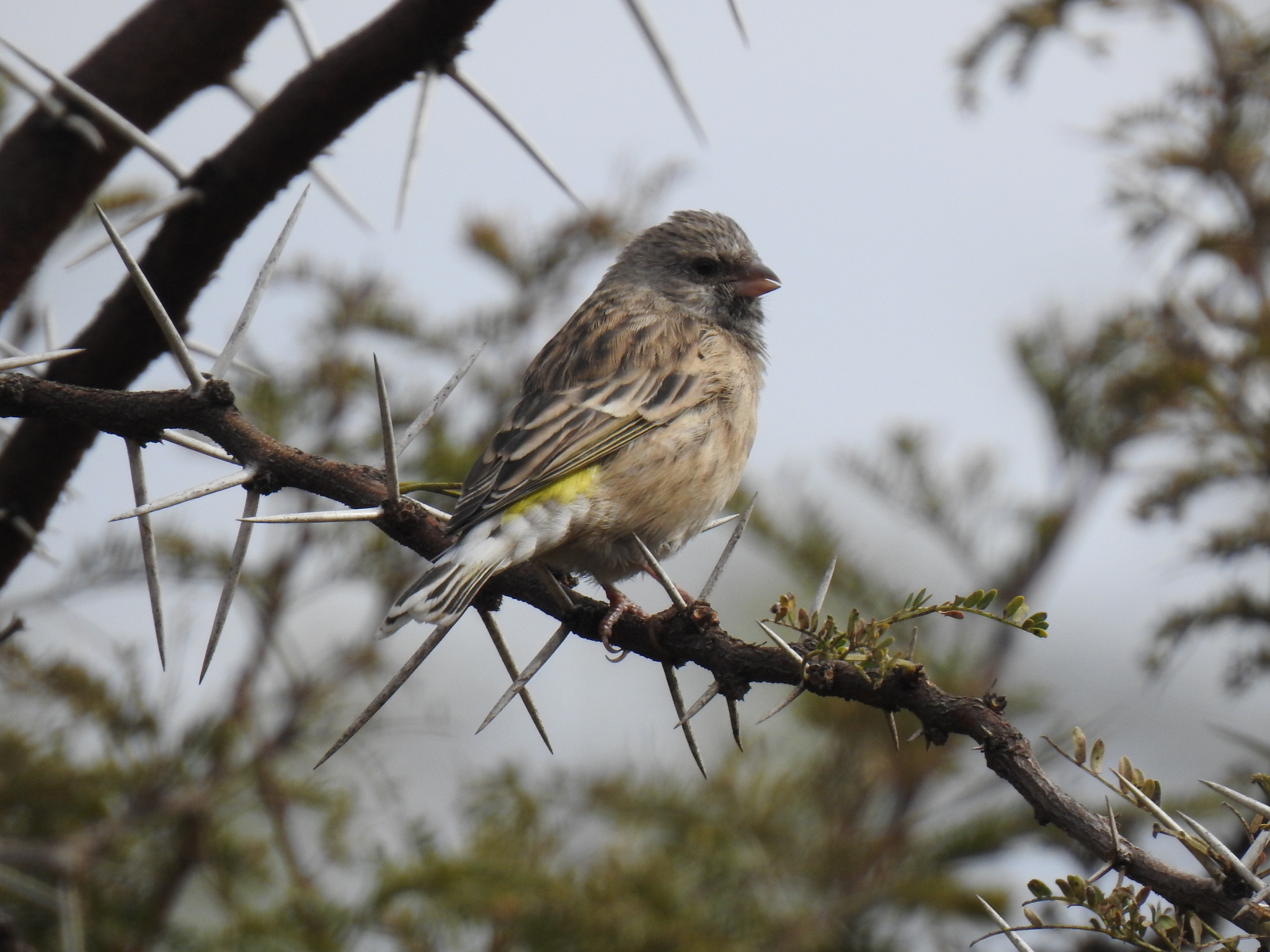
Black-throated canary

Order: Passeriformes Family: Fringillidae

Finches are seed-eating passerine birds, that are small to moderately large and have a strong beak, usually conical and in some species very large. All have twelve tail feathers and nine primaries. These birds have a bouncing flight with alternating bouts of flapping and gliding on closed wings, and most sing well.

- Yellow-fronted canary, Crithagra mozambicus
- African citril, Crithagra citrinelloides
- Western citril, Crithagra frontalis
- Black-faced canary, Crithagra capistratus
- Black-throated canary, Crithagra atrogularis
- Brimstone canary, Crithagra sulphuratus
- Yellow canary, Crithagra flaviventris
- White-throated canary, Crithagra albogularis
- Thick-billed seedeater, Crithagra burtoni
- Black-eared seedeater, Crithagra mennelli
- Streaky-headed seedeater, Crithagra gularis
- Yellow-crowned canary, Serinus flavivertex

== Old World buntings ==
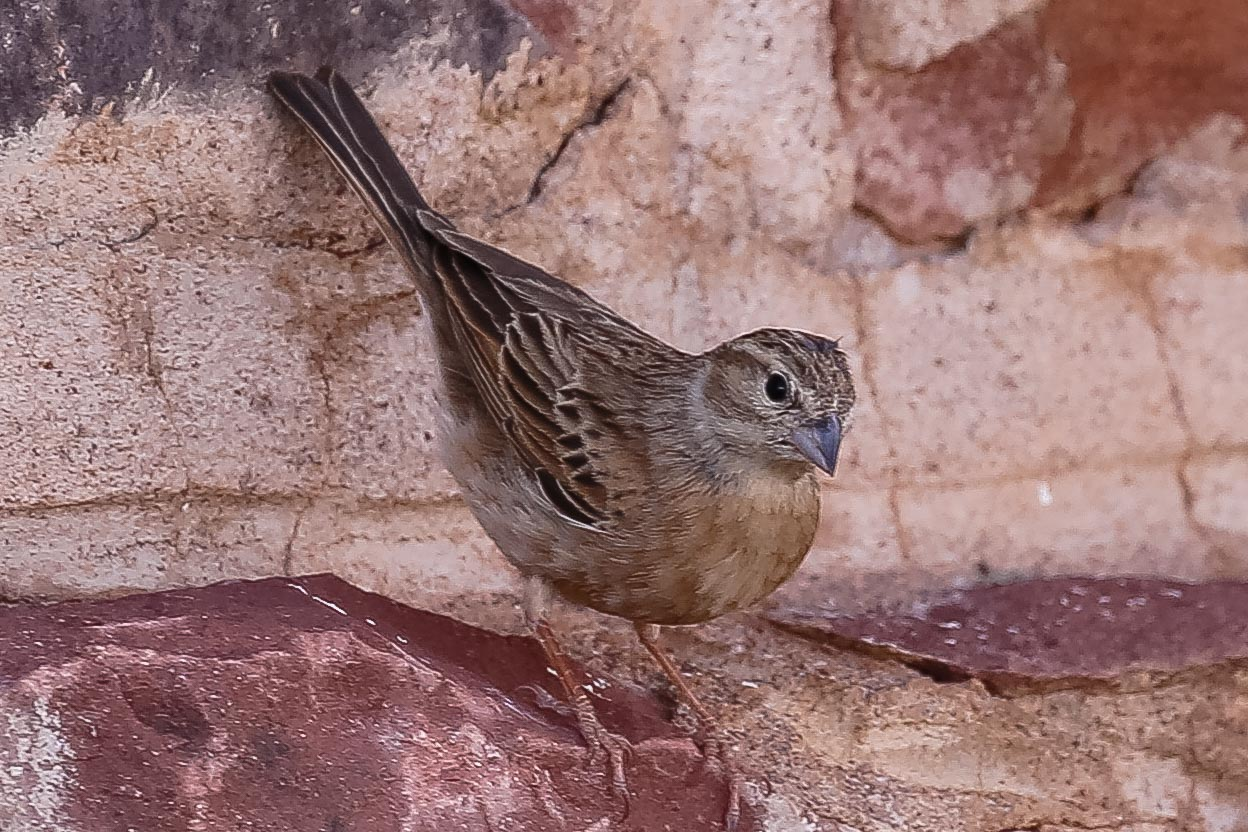
Lark-like bunting

Order: Passeriformes Family: Emberizidae

The emberizids are a large family of passerine birds. They are seed-eating birds with distinctively shaped bills.

- Cabanis's bunting, Emberiza cabanisi
- Golden-breasted bunting, Emberiza flaviventris
- Cape bunting, Emberiza capensis
- Lark-like bunting, Emberiza impetuani
- Cinnamon-breasted bunting, Emberiza tahapisi

== See also ==
- List of birds
- Lists of birds by region
