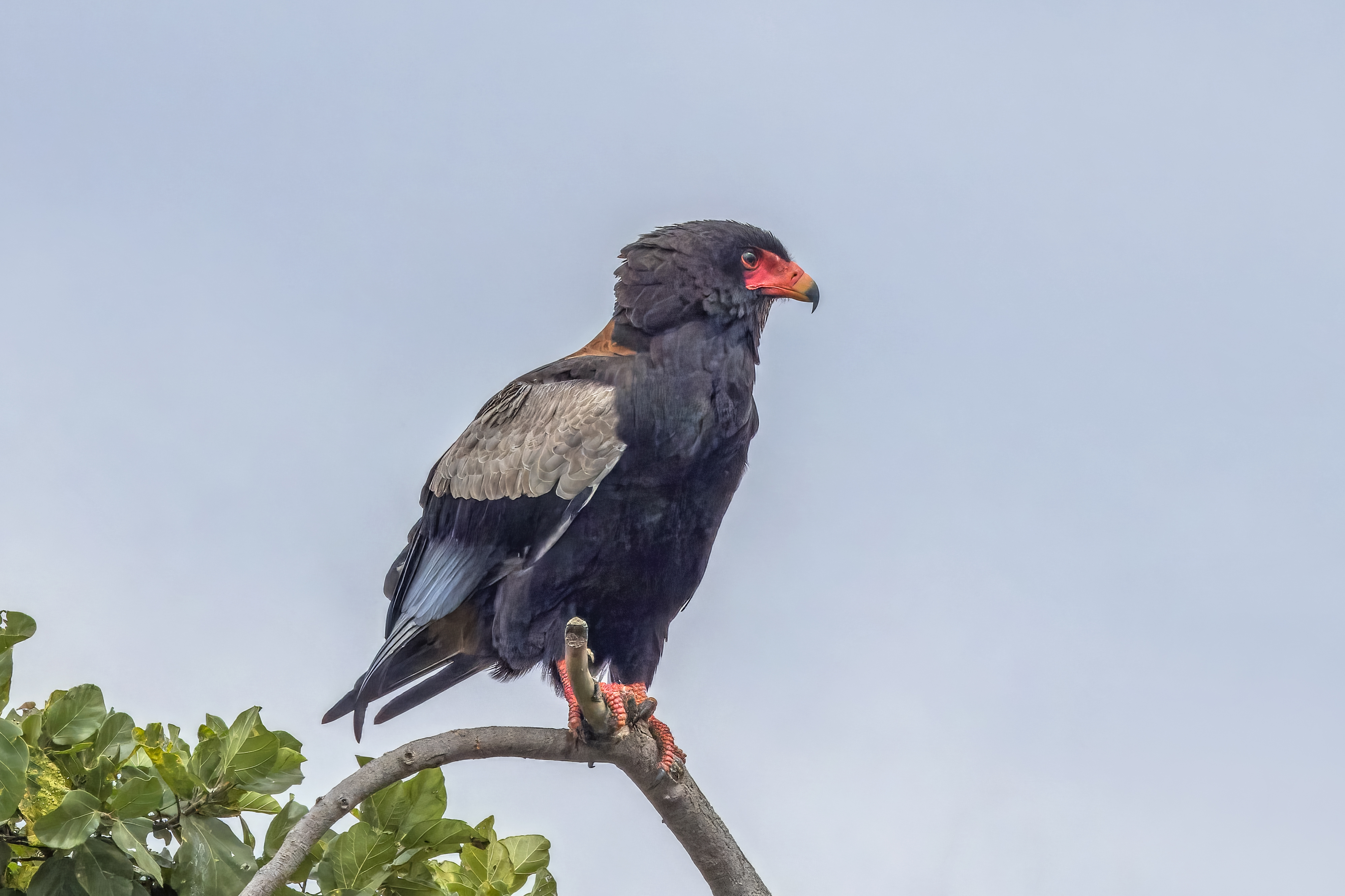
- Male, Serengeti National Park

Conservation status
- Endangered (IUCN 3.1)

Scientific classification
- Kingdom: Animalia
- Phylum: Chordata
- Class: Aves
- Order: Accipitriformes
- Family: Accipitridae
- Subfamily: Circaetinae
- Genus: Terathopius; Lesson, 1830
- Species: T. ecaudatus

Binomial name
- Terathopius ecaudatus (Daudin, 1800)
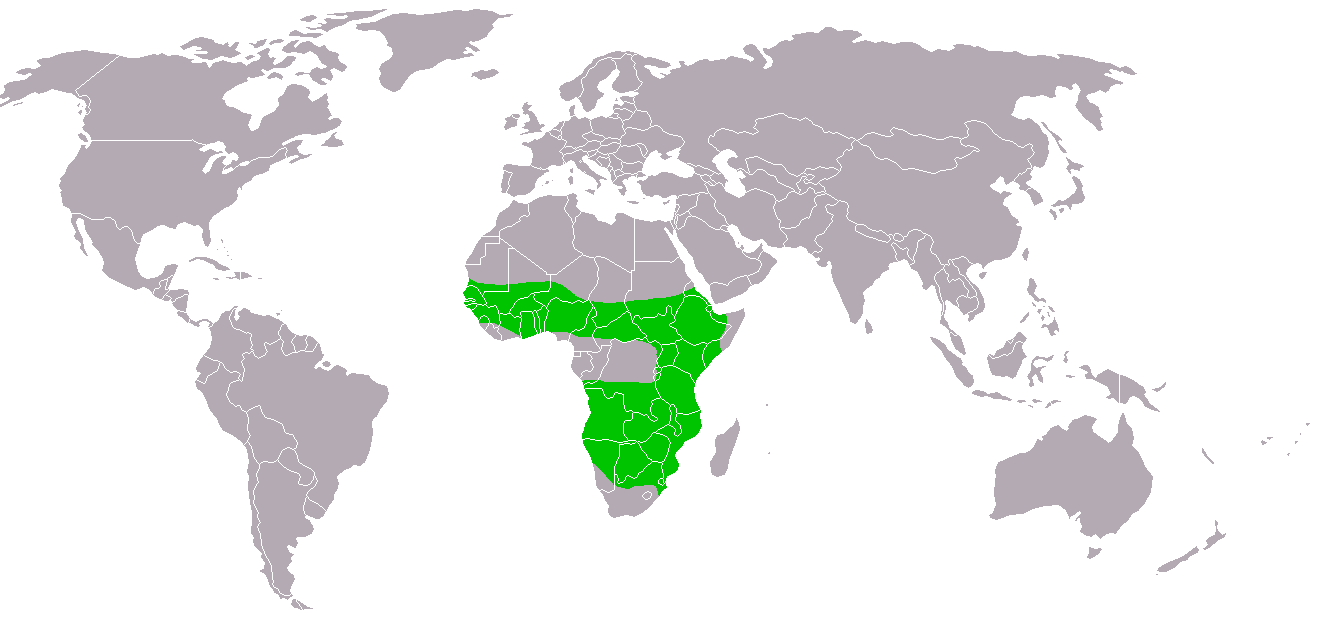
- approximate breeding range

= Bateleur =

Species of bird

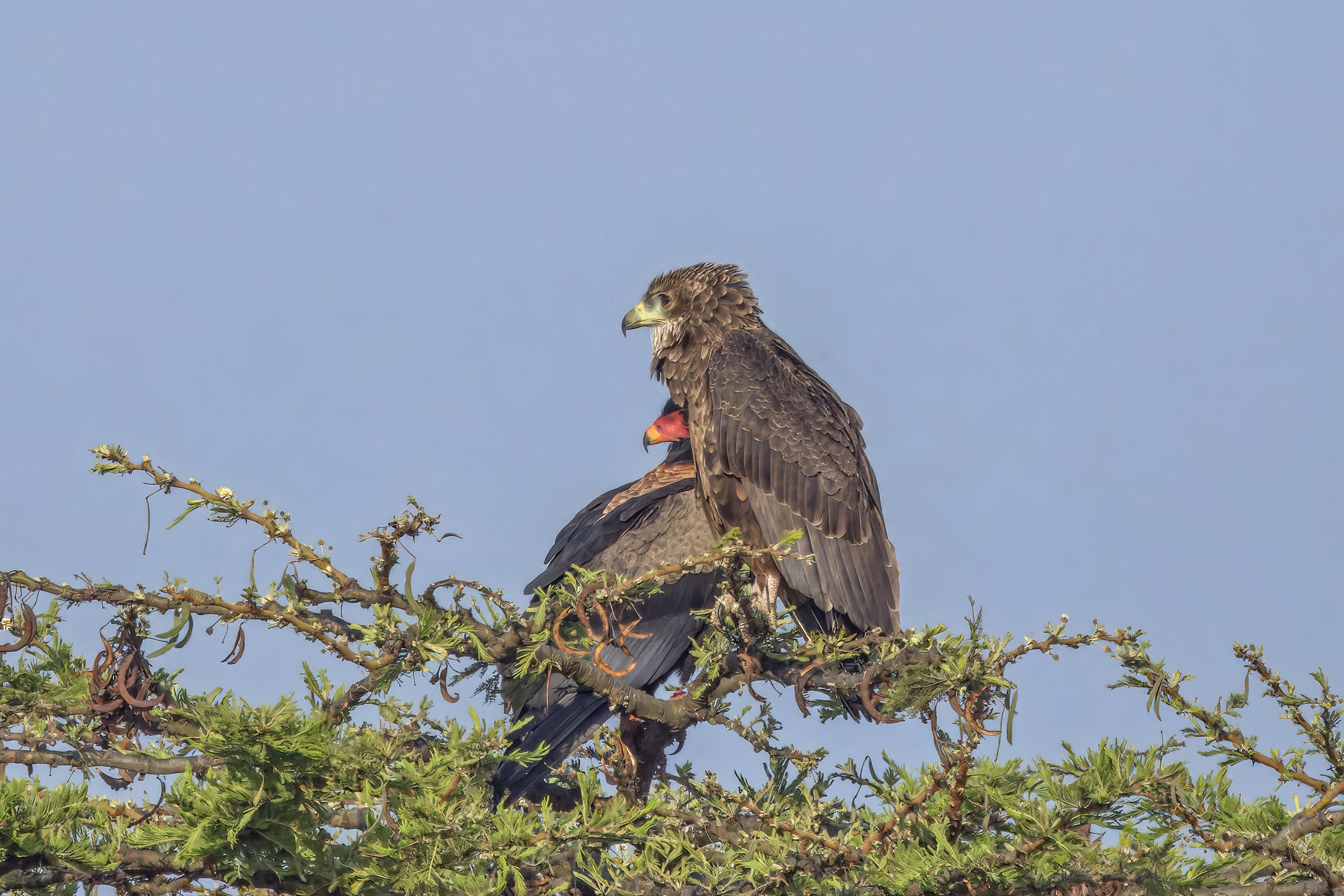
immature with adult in the Serengeti

The bateleur (/ˌbætəˈlɜːr, ˈbætəlɜːr/; Terathopius ecaudatus), also known as the bateleur eagle, is a medium-sized eagle in the family Accipitridae. It is often considered a relative of the snake eagles and, like them, it is classified within the subfamily Circaetinae. It is the only member of the genus Terathopius and may be the origin of the "Zimbabwe Bird", the national emblem of Zimbabwe. Adult bateleurs are generally black in colour with a chestnut colour on the mantle as well as on the rump and tail. Adults also have gray patches about the leading edges of the wings (extending to the secondaries in females) with bright red on their cere and their feet. Adults also show white greater coverts, contrasting with black remiges in males, gray patches on the underwing primaries and black wingtips. The juvenile bateleur is quite different, being largely drab brown with a bit of paler feather scaling. All bateleurs have extremely large heads for their size, rather small bills, large feet, relatively short legs, long, bow-like wings and uniquely short tails, which are much smaller still on adults compared to juvenile birds.

This species is native to broad areas of Sub-Saharan Africa and scarcely up into Arabia. It is characteristically a bird of somewhat open habitats such as savanna with some trees present and open dry woodland. It is in life history, a rather peculiar bird of prey with a free-wheeling generalist diet that includes much carrion but also tends to hunt a wide range of live prey, including many small to unexpectedly relatively large mammals and reptiles along with generally relatively small birds. Bateleurs are highly aerial birds that spend much time soaring and will frequently fly with exaggerated embellishments, perhaps when excited or angered. They tend to build a relatively small if sturdy stick nest in a large tree and lay only a single egg. Despite being a rather aggressive bird in other contexts, bateleurs are easily flushed from their own nest, making them exceptionally vulnerable to nest predators, including humans, and nest failures. It may take as long as 7 to 8 years to attain full maturity, perhaps the longest stretch to maturity of any raptor. This species has long been known to be declining rather pronouncedly in overall population and it is mostly confined to protected areas today. Currently the IUCN classifies the bateleur as an Endangered species due primarily to anthropogenic causes such as habitat destruction, pesticide usage and persecution.

== Taxonomy and etymology ==
The bateleur has been found to be a proper member of the subfamily Circaetinae, commonly called snake or serpent eagles, via a variety of genetic studies. Given the outward similarities of the bateleur to snake eagles, the relationship has long been inferred by authors. In particular, the bateleur was suggested to have their closest living relations in the similarly large Circaetus snake eagles. This relationship was well borne-out by a genetic study that found that this species and the short-toed snake eagle (Circaetus gallicus) form a monophyletic clade, based on nucleotide sequences in the cytochrome b gene. Even though, when contrasted with snake eagles, bateleurs appear to differ greatly in plumage patterns, the two genera show certain similarities in food, feeding behavior, and breeding biology. However, Lerner and Mindell (2005), based on the molecular sequence from two mitochondrial genes and one nuclear intron, indicated a previously unsuspected close relationship of the bateleur with similarly "aberrant" but extremely different, in nearly every respect of appearance and life history, member of the Circaetinae, the Philippine eagle (Pithecophaga jefferyi). Chromosome banding studies have also found a relatively recent genetic relationship of the bateleurs with the Old World vultures.

=== Etymology ===
The common name of "Bateleur" is French for "street performer". Meanwhile, the scientific name is from name teras (Greek) for "marvelous"; ops (Greek) for "face"; e (Latin) for "without"; caudatus (Latin) "tail". The bird was given its common name by François Levaillant, a French naturalist and explorer. The original scientific name was Falco ecaudatus, given by François Marie Daudin, as the concept of disparate genera between birds of prey was devised later on (nor were falcons then known to be unrelated to many other variety of diurnal birds of prey).

== Description ==
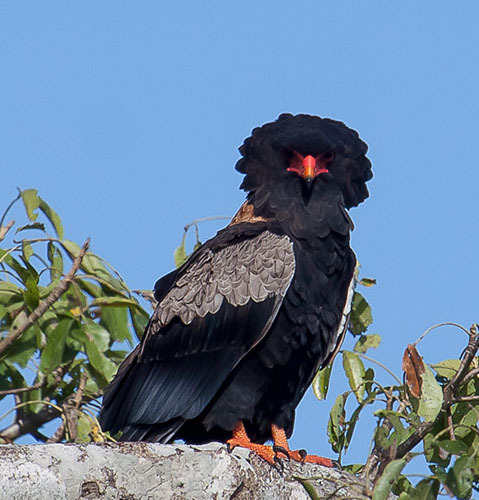
Male displaying his cowl, in Mozambique

The bateleur is of note for its unique morphology and plumage, with some anatomical similarities to both snake eagles and vultures. The species has a thick neck and a very large, rather conspicuously cowled head with a proportionately short bill, albeit one covered with a very large cere. The cowl is also present on snake eagles but in those it is less dramatically apparent. The other features in perched adult bateleurs are rather oddly stumpy, such as the short legs and exceptionally short tail, possibly the shortest proportionately of all raptors. Its posture while perched is extremely upright, making them look like quite a tall raptor on the ground despite its rather short legs. Even while perched, the body tends to be dominated by their exceptionally large wings, which possess some 25 secondary feathers, perhaps more than any other raptor.

The adult bateleur usually has a chestnut coloration along the mantle, back, rump and tail, including the undertail coverts. The adult male bateleur is predominantly black with grey shoulders, which appear edged with white when freshly moulted. The adult female differs by having grey-brown, not black, on the greater coverts and black-tipped grey, not black, secondaries. Furthermore up to 7% of adults have a "cream morph" where they have chestnut tails but the other chestnut areas are almost fully replaced by cream to pale brown coloring. The cream morph may reportedly be slightly more prevalent in drier areas. The bare parts of adult bateleurs are exceptionally conspicuous, with the adult cere, bare facial skin and feet all being rather bright red, however in some they can also temporarily fade to pink, pale pink or yellowish at times, such as when they are perching in the shade or bathing. The bare parts flush the most red during times of excitement. The bill itself is black with a yellow centre and red base. The eyes are dark brown.

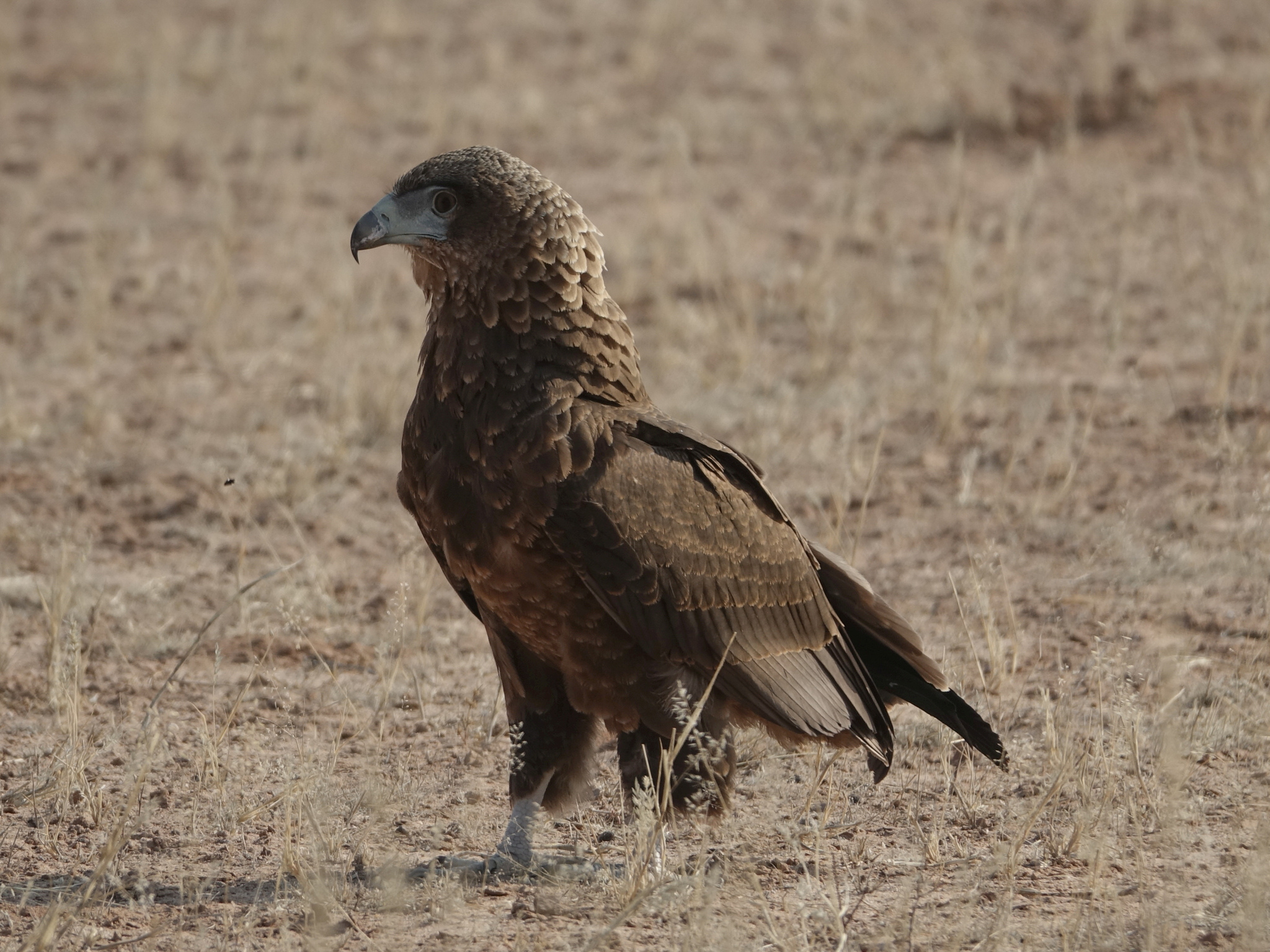
Juvenile, in South Africa
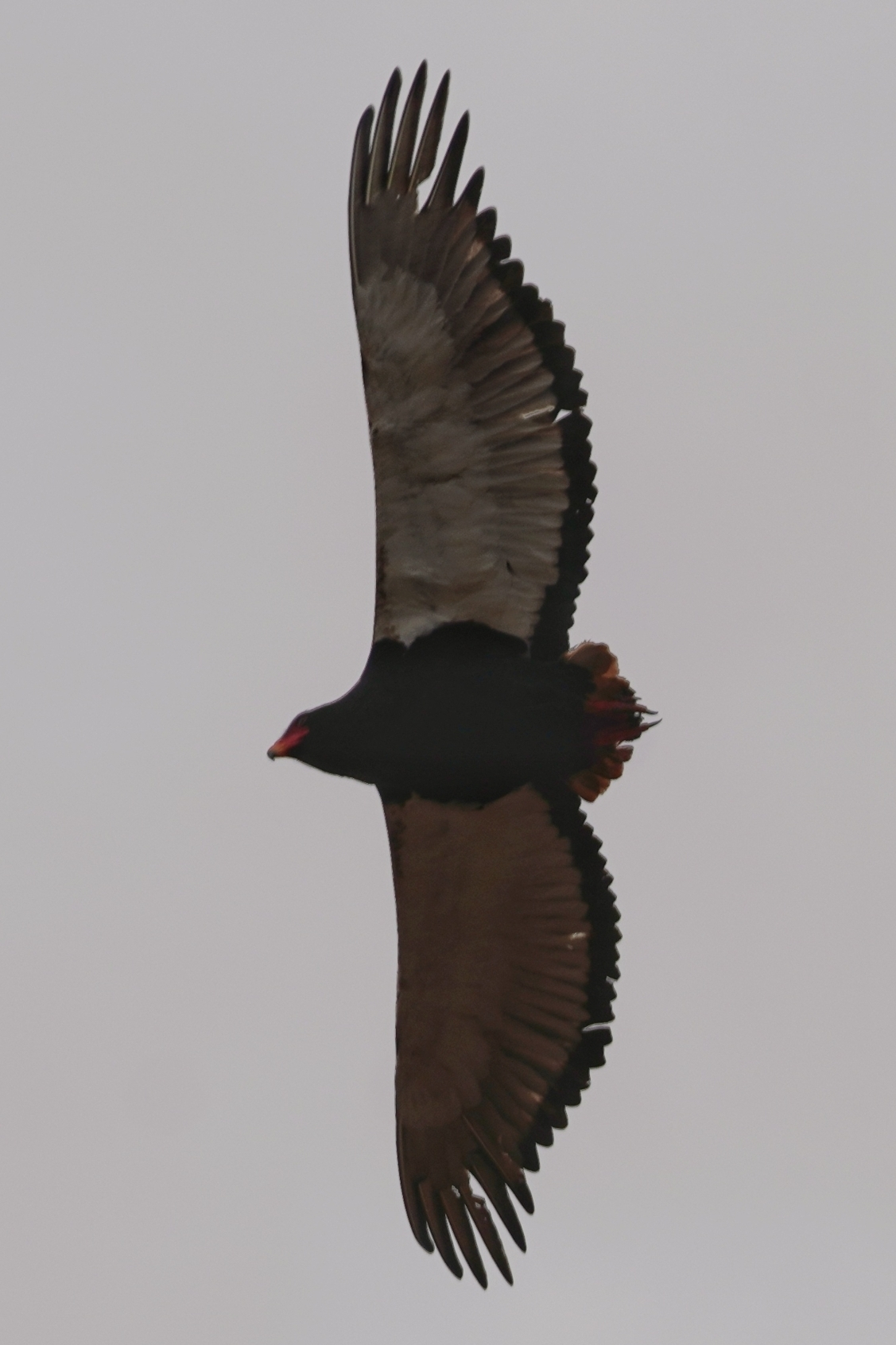
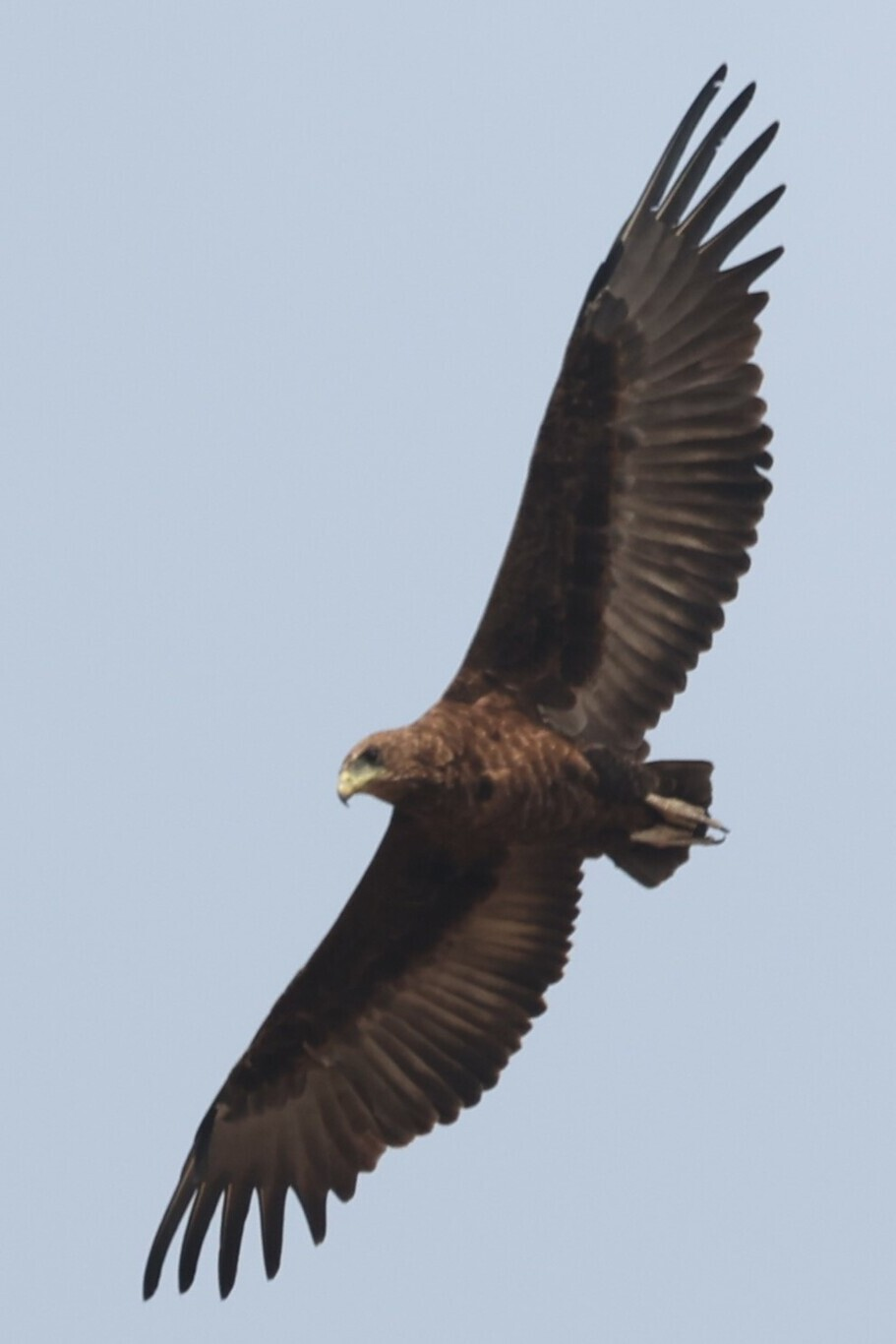
Adult (left) and juvenile (right), showing the latter's longer tail

The juvenile is very distinct from the adults of the species. Juveniles of the bateleur have a longer tail than mature birds. They furthermore have essentially all brown coloring, with dull rufous to creamy edging apparent on some areas. The head of the juvenile bateleur is paler and tawnier than elsewhere on its body while the eyes are brown, the cere a rather unique greenish-blue and the feet whitish in colour. At as late as 2–3 years of age, the immature bateleur is still much the same in appearance as the juvenile but by the fourth year becomes more sooty-brown, with sexual dimorphism already evidenced by the more extensive dark wing markings of males. In the 5th year, the plumage may show the first signs of chestnut and the grey colour about back and shoulders tend to manifest. Also from 3–5 years old, the cere and feet turn yellow then to dull-pink. By the sixth and seventh years of life, the plumage of subadult bateleurs blackens and the chestnut portions of the plumage increase. The shoulders become fully grey by the 8th year, the likely age of maturity. As for the bare parts in juvenile bateleurs, the cere and facial skin are a distinct pale grey-blue to green-blue. The juvenile's feet are greenish-white to greyish-white, at 4-5 the cere, facial skin and feet turn yellow, then pink before finally reddening. The eyes are similar in hue to those of adult bateleurs but are a slightly lighter, being more honey-brown, while the bill of juveniles are mainly pale grey-blue in colour.

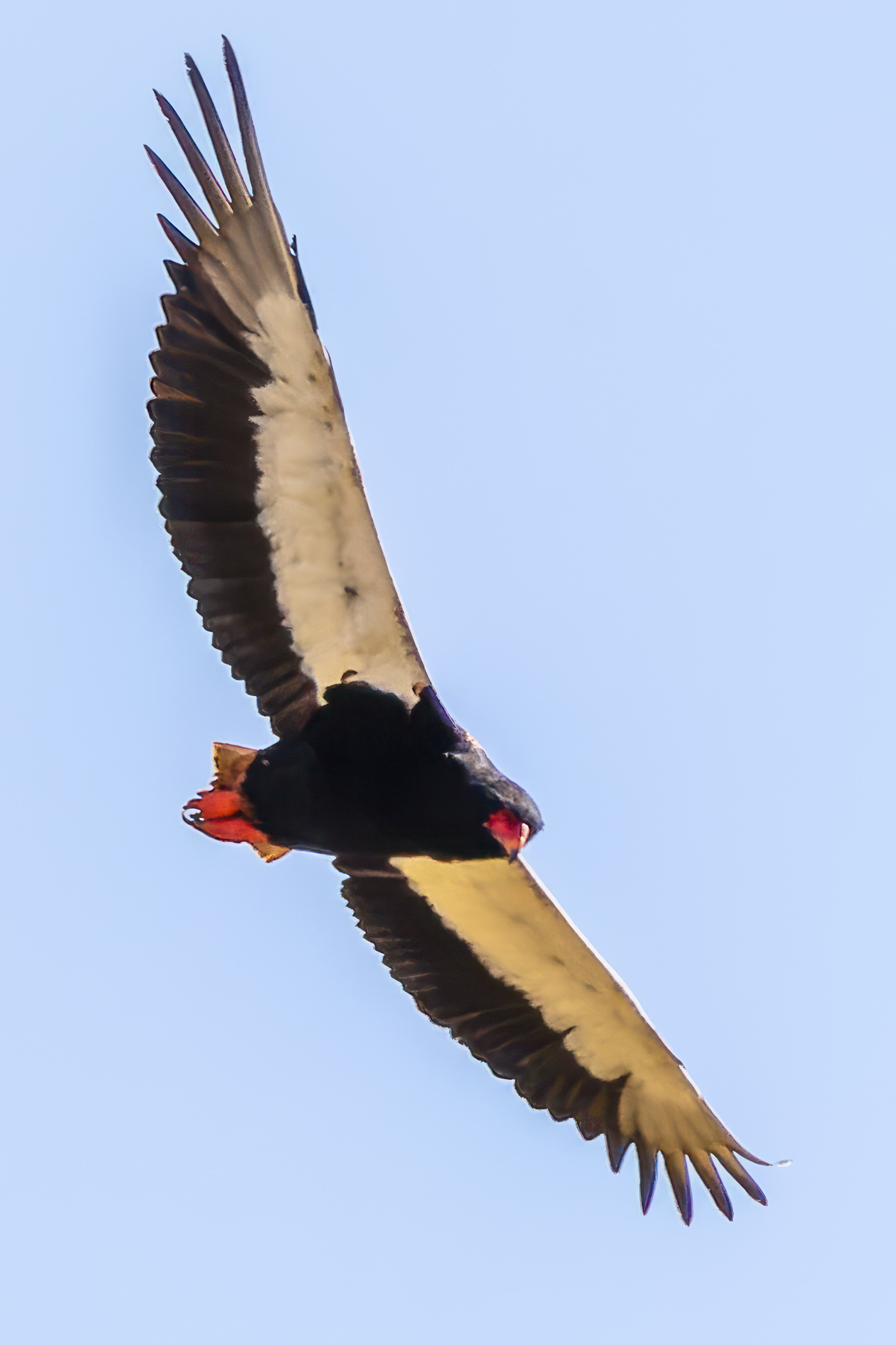
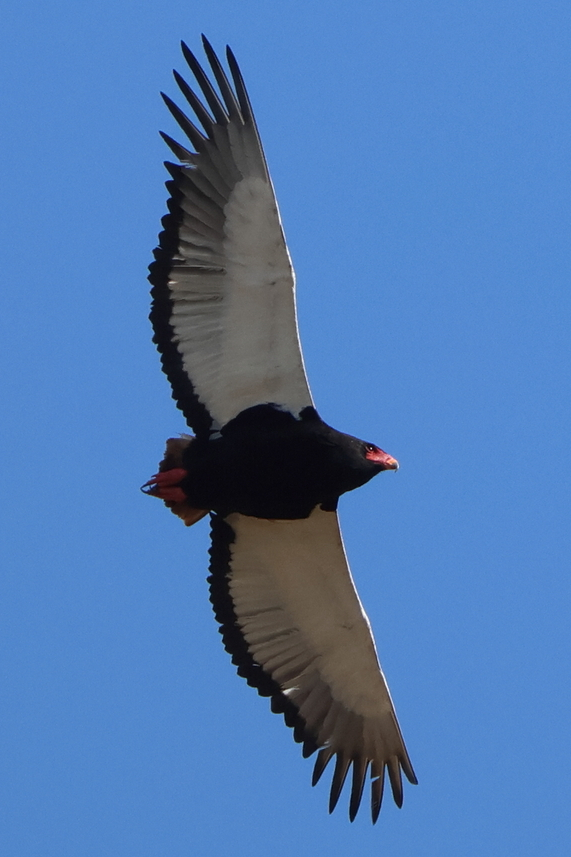
Male (left) and female (right), showing the difference in colour of the wing feathers

In flight, the bateleur appears as a rather large raptor with disproportionately elongated, rather narrow and slightly bow-shaped wings, which appear pinched in at the bases, broad across the secondaries and regularly narrow, pointed and upturned at the tips. Upon sighting, the wings often catch the eye before the large head, which is proportionately slightly bigger even than their cousins, the snake eagles. The tail is so short in adult bateleurs that the feet extend below the tail tip, almost giving the impression that the raptor nearly has no tail. This is as opposed to juveniles, where the feet come up about 5 cm (2.0 in) short of the tail tip, with the feet coming to exceed the tail, which is shrinking via moults, in length around the 5th year of maturation. The adult bateleur's wingspan is an extraordinary 2.9 times greater than its total length. The adult male bateleur is mostly black above with a chestnut back and tail and grey forewings, below he is black on the body, contrasting with a chestnut tail, as well as with the white wing linings and black flight feathers except for the greyish based primaries. The adult female bateleur is similar in plumage to the male overall but differs in her black-tipped grey secondaries above and more extensively white underwings with the black on the female confined to the wingtips and trailing edges. The juvenile bateleur on the wing appears broader winged and especially longer tailed with a largely uniform brown coloration, including the greater coverts, with paler feather mainly about the head as well as on the flight feathers.

=== Size ===
The bateleur is a mid-sized eagle and large raptor. It is likely the second heaviest of the Circaetinae subfamily of accipitrids. By far the largest of the subfamily is the Philippine eagle which is more than twice as massive and is far larger in all aspects of measurement than the bateleur, with a drastically differing structure (broad, relatively short wings, very long legs and tail). One traditional snake eagle, the brown snake eagle ( Circaetus cinereus), rivals the bateleur in most aspects of size including body mass but possesses a rather longer tail and slightly shorter but broader wings. Additionally, the widespread and slightly broader-winged short-toed snake eagle and proportionately long and slender-winged black-breasted snake eagle (Circaetus pectoralis) can be nearly as large in wingspan as the bateleur but tend to be somewhat less heavy. The total length of the bateleur is 55 to 70 cm (22 to 28 in). Typical length of a full-grown bird is around 63.5 cm (25.0 in). The wingspan of bateleurs can vary from 168 to 190 cm (5 ft 6 in to 6 ft 3 in). Body mass of bateleurs can vary from 1,800 to 3,000 g (4.0 to 6.6 lb). One sample of 10 unsexed bateleurs weighed an average of 2,200 g (4.9 lb) while a smaller sample of three weighed an average of 2,392 g (5.273 lb). Additionally, a median body mass of 2,385 g (5.258 lb) was cited in one study.

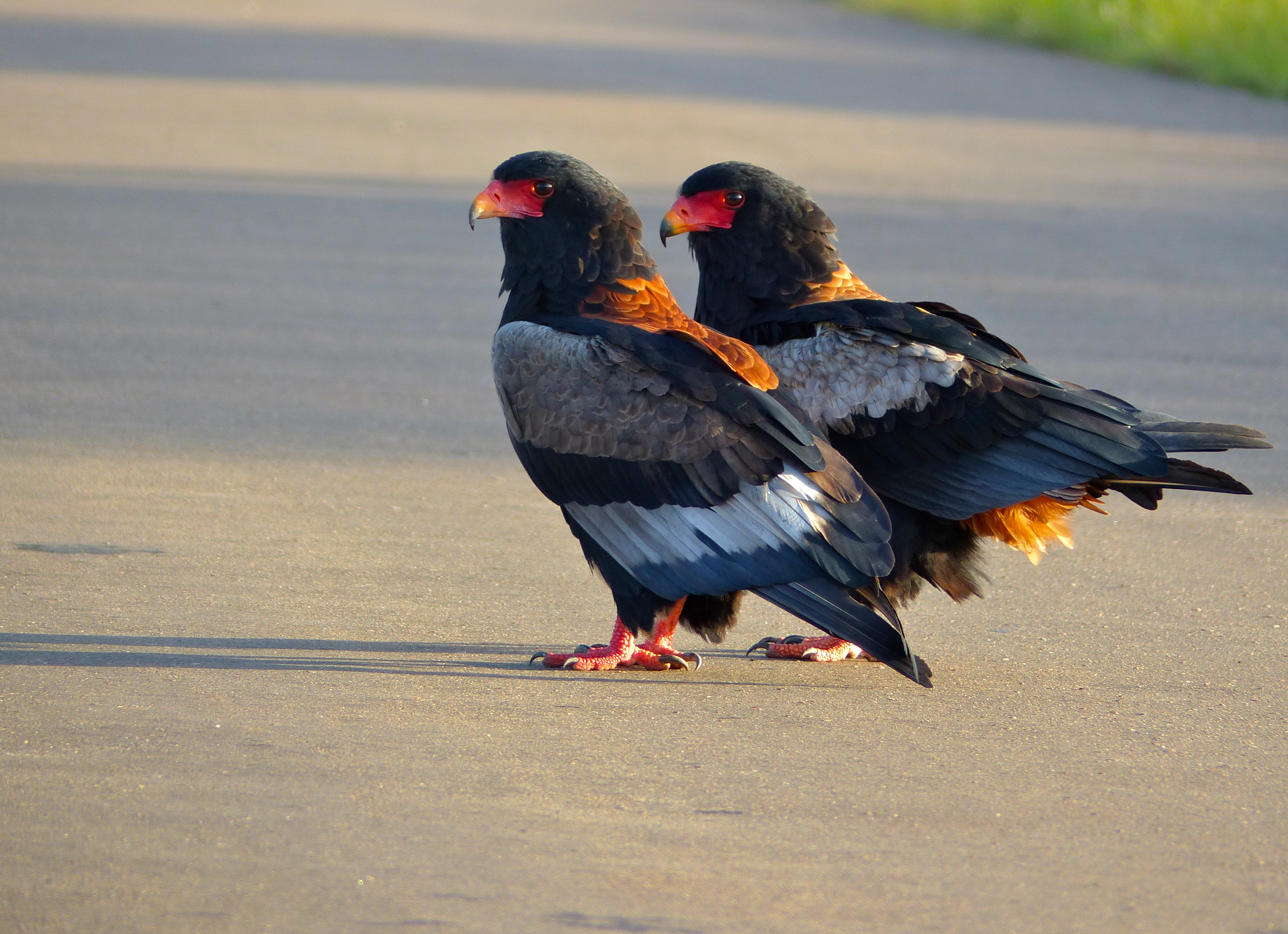
Female (left) and male (right), at Kruger National Park

The bateleur evidences some sexual dimorphism in favour of the female as is expected in raptorial birds but this size difference is fairly minimal relative to many other accipitrids, averaging up to about 6%. Among standard measurements, males have a wing chord length of 476 to 553 mm (18.7 to 21.8 in) while that of the female is 530 to 559 mm (20.9 to 22.0 in). In tail length, adult males measure 98 to 124 mm (3.9 to 4.9 in) and can be even shorter in adult females at 105 to 113 mm (4.1 to 4.4 in), in some cases the adult's tail may reportedly measure as short as 72 mm (2.8 in). This contrasts with the tail of juvenile bateleurs which measures 142 to 172 mm (5.6 to 6.8 in). The tarsus can measure from 67 to 75 mm (2.6 to 3.0 in) in males and 72 to 75 mm (2.8 to 3.0 in) in females. Unsexed adult bateleurs in Tsavo East National Park were found to average 513 mm (20.2 in) in wing chord length, 34.5 mm (1.36 in) with a range of 28.6 to 38 mm (1.13 to 1.50 in) in culmen length and a relatively small hind claw length of 30.6 mm (1.20 in). While the hind or hallux claw is usually the most enlarged in most species of accipitrid, on the other hand in the Tsavo East bateleurs, unusually the middle claw on the front of the foot was slightly larger at 32 mm (1.3 in). Notably the proportions of bateleurs are similar to snake eagles with robust feet with rough, thick skin and short talons, the bateleur in particular having very thick, large toes structurally almost like those of a big owl and very sharp talons reminiscent in sharpness of highly predaceous larger African raptors. Further like snake eagles, bateleurs have a rather large headed but with a smallish beak coupled with a large gape. These adaptations generally equip the subfamily to better handle and ingest snakes relative to other accipitrids.

=== Identification ===
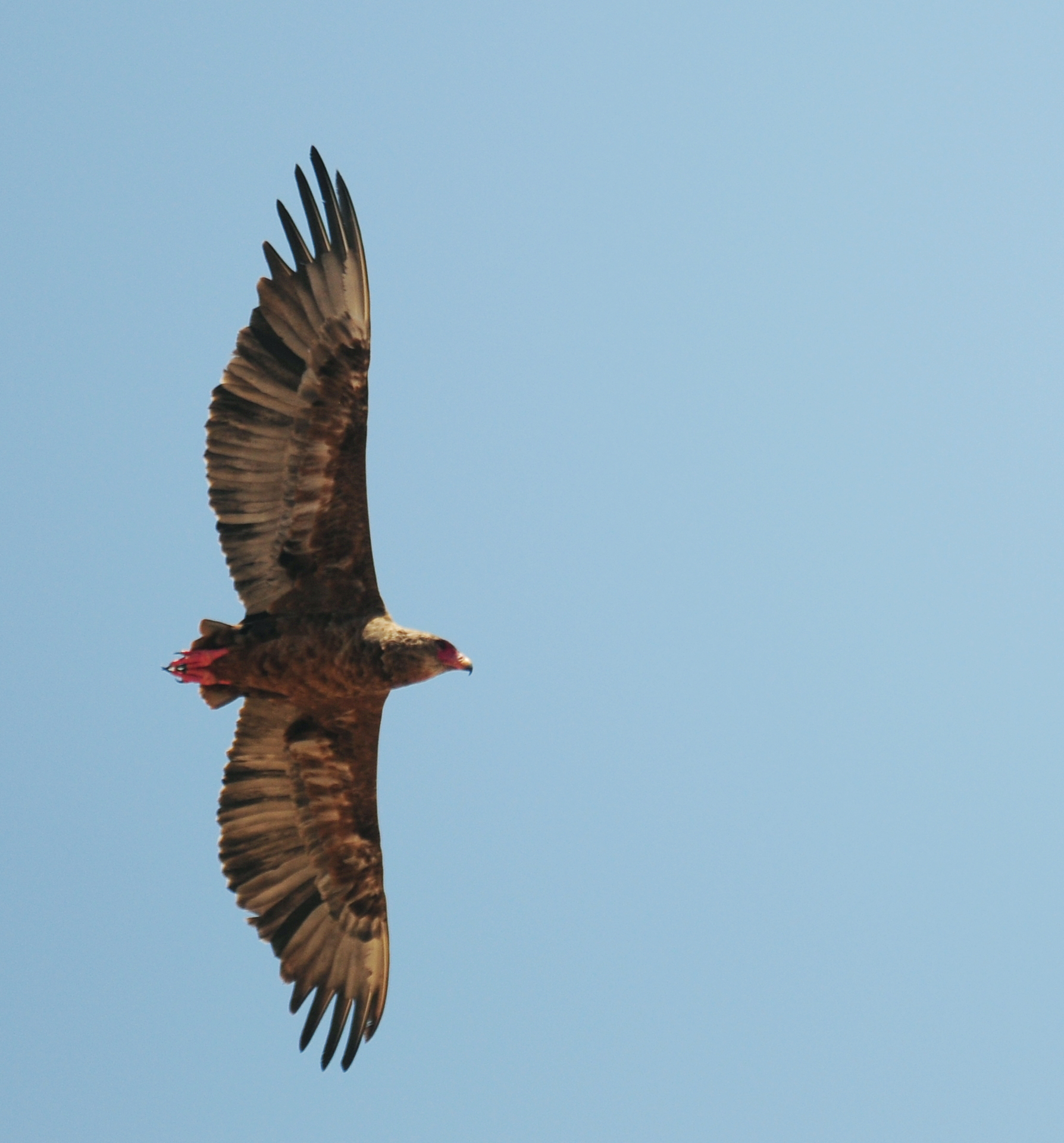
Subadult, at Tarangire National Park

The bateleur, particularly in its adult plumage, is often considered one of the most distinctive raptors in the world. When perched or flying adults or older immatures are quite unmistakable. The bateleur can be readily be distinguished even by inexperienced observers from the very differently-shaped and usually rather smaller-bodied and winged augur buzzards (Buteo augur) and jackal buzzards (Buteo rufofuscus). These do not overlap with bateleurs in nearly all respects of morphology, proportions nor flight actions. Nonetheless, both of these buzzards are sometimes mistaken for bateleurs due to their own combinations of black, white and chestnut, which are completely differently composed than those of the bateleur. Despite how distinctive the buzzards are from the bateleur, some reports of bateleurs from areas where they are currently gone are almost certain to have been misidentified jackal buzzards. Juveniles and immatures of up to 2–3 years old are hardly less distinctive in shape but could be confused, largely due to similar proportions of their large head, brown plumage and whitish legs with certain snake eagles. The brown snake eagle is perhaps the most similar to the juvenile bateleur but it has yellow eyes, longer legs, much broader, shorter and differently shaped wings with the tips of wings reaching its banded tail. Even the black-chested and the rather slight Beaudouin's snake eagle (Circaetus beaudouinii) are sometimes considered potentially confusable with juvenile bateleurs, but both of these respective species are rather uniform and darker brown ventrally and about the head and much paler dorsally, with a highly different contrasting whitish cream colour below.

=== Vocalizations ===
Bateleurs are usually silent for much of the year. The main call, uttered whether perched or in aerial display, or when pirating from other raptors, is a far-carrying, loud raucous schaaaa-aw. They may too vocalize in a similar manner during courtship. Alternatively, bateleur calls may consist of resonant barking calls, kow-aw. The barking call can be accompanied by half-spread wings and jerking of the body up and down or may too be uttered in flight, the latter in a similar manner to that of a fish eagle. Distraction display are sometimes accompanied by subdued barking chatter, ka-ka-ka-ka.... A not dissimilar call of kau-kau-kau-koaagh-koaggh has been described as given by perched birds. Other softer calls are uttered when perched near the nest. The young of the bateleur tend to engage harsh squealing call is kyup-kyup keeaw keeaw, usually as a hunger call at approach of parent with food. Also the species' young may make a melodious twip call.

== Distribution ==
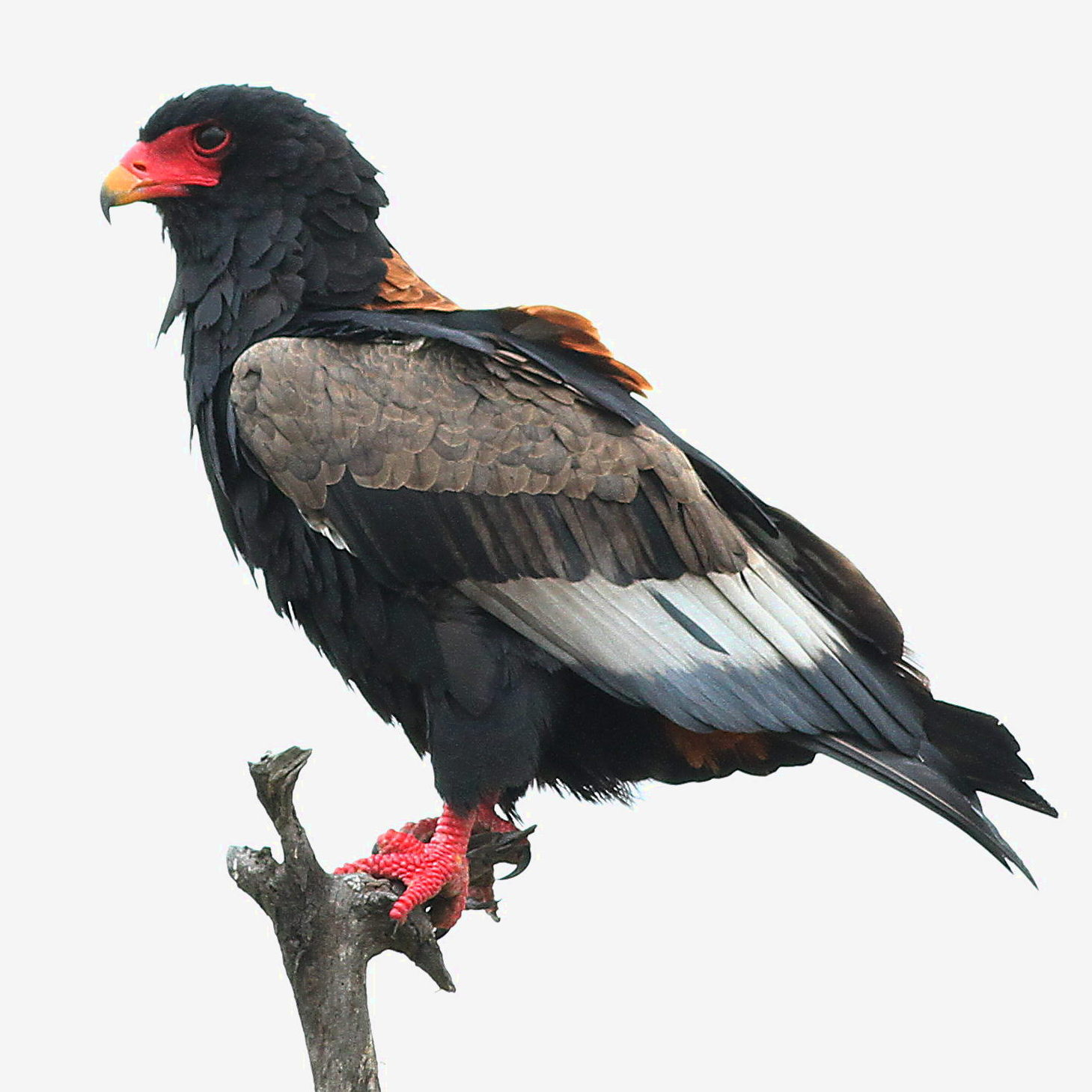
Female, at Kruger National Park

The bateleur occupies a very large range through mainly sub-Saharan Africa. The species resides in West Africa from southern Mauritania to Senegal, The Gambia, Guinea-Bissau, Guinea, the northern portions of Sierra Leone, Ivory Coast and much of Ghana through western Burkina Faso, much of Togo and Benin and northern and central Nigeria.

It is possibly extinct in Mauritania, range restricted in Guinea (mainly to Kiang West) and Liberia but is still locally common where good habitat remains elsewhere in this region. Similarly far north, a rare population is believed to persist out of Africa in extreme southwestern Saudi Arabia and western Yemen. In central and east Africa, the bateleur may be found in northern Cameroon, southern Niger, southern Chad, southern Sudan, South Sudan, northern Central African Republic, Eritrea, Ethiopia, Djibouti, western Somalia, northern, eastern and southern Democratic Republic of the Congo and a majority of Uganda, Kenya and Tanzania. In Southern Africa, the bateleur is found quite widely, being found almost throughout, where habitat is favorable, Angola, Zambia, Zimbabwe, Malawi and Mozambique. Additionally, they may range Botswana in all but southernmost portion also being found still in northern and eastern Namibia and northwestern South Africa, where its range has contracted considerably from as far south once as the Cape Province to almost entirely to being found exclusively within protected areas north of the Orange River excepting a portion of Kruger National Park. The species is possibly extirpated from Eswatini in southern Africa.

=== Vagrancy ===
The bateleur is regarded as a vagrant in the countries of Tunisia, Cyprus and rarely Egypt, Israel and Iraq. In April 2012 a juvenile bateleur was seen in Algeciras in southern Spain. In 2015 and 2022, juveniles spotted as far north as Black Sea coast of Turkey in the cities of Istanbul and Sinop respectively.

== Habitat ==
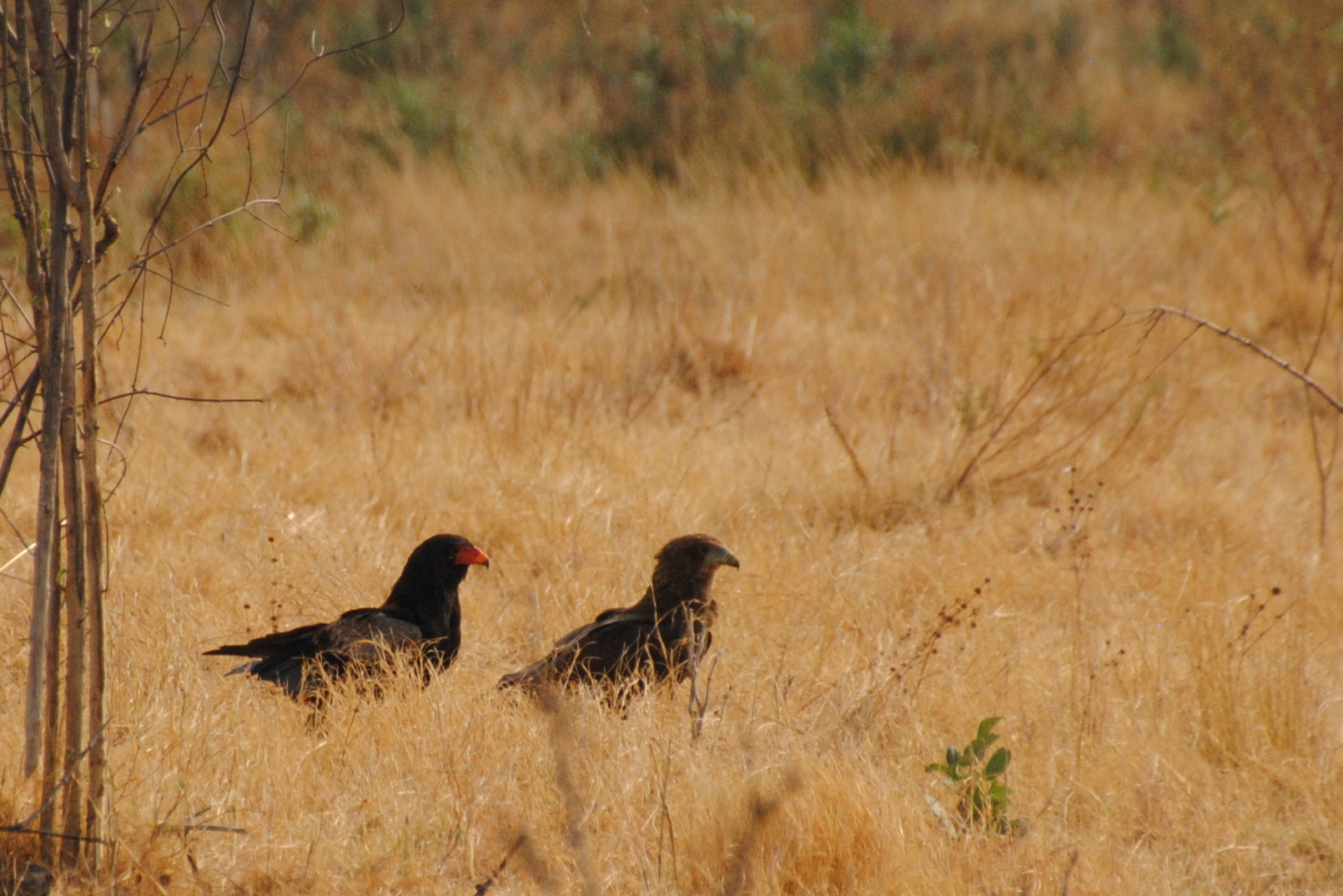
An adult and juvenile in characteristic savanna habitat in Botswana.

The bateleur is a common to fairly common resident or nomadic bird of the partially open savanna country and of woodland within Sub-Saharan Africa. During breeding, it tends to require closed-canopy savannah-woodland habitats, including Acacia savanna as well as mopane and miombo woodlands. They may too acclimate to thornveld and overall various fairly shrubby areas. It tends to rarely occur in heavily forested and mountainous habitats. However, while the species can forage extensively in largely treeless habitats such as treeless savanna but is nearly as rare in pure desert lacking arborescent growth as it is in tropical rainforests. Bateleurs are seldom to be found around extensive wetlands but may regularly be found near watering holes. Although often in fairly dry savanna habitats, in Kenya it is reportedly absent from areas where the rainfall is under 250 mm (9.8 in) annually, probably because it limits the growth of the leafy trees that they require for nesting. In Ethiopia, it tends to be associated with well-wooded areas. Habitat tends to be most closely studied in southern Africa. It is mostly common found in broad-leaved woodland in the Okavango Delta in Botswana. In Namibia it is often found over tall woodland near drainage lines, and over ephemeral rivers in north-eastern Namibia and within the more arid Etosha National Park. In Zambia, it is found in a variety of habitats from woodlands to open plains but avoids the most densely wooded areas. Reportedly in Malawi, it is often associated with Forest–savanna mosaics but is sometimes regularly seen over cultivated areas and even may be seen flying over large cities. To the contrary, in Mozambique it is said to avoid areas with a dense human population.

The species can occur from sea level up to 4,500 m (14,800 ft), but not normally a mountain-dwelling species and mainly occurs below 3,000 m (9,800 ft). This is supported in Zimbabwe, where the bateleur is relatively common but appears to largely avoid the extensive amount of hilly and rugged areas present in that country.

== Behaviour ==
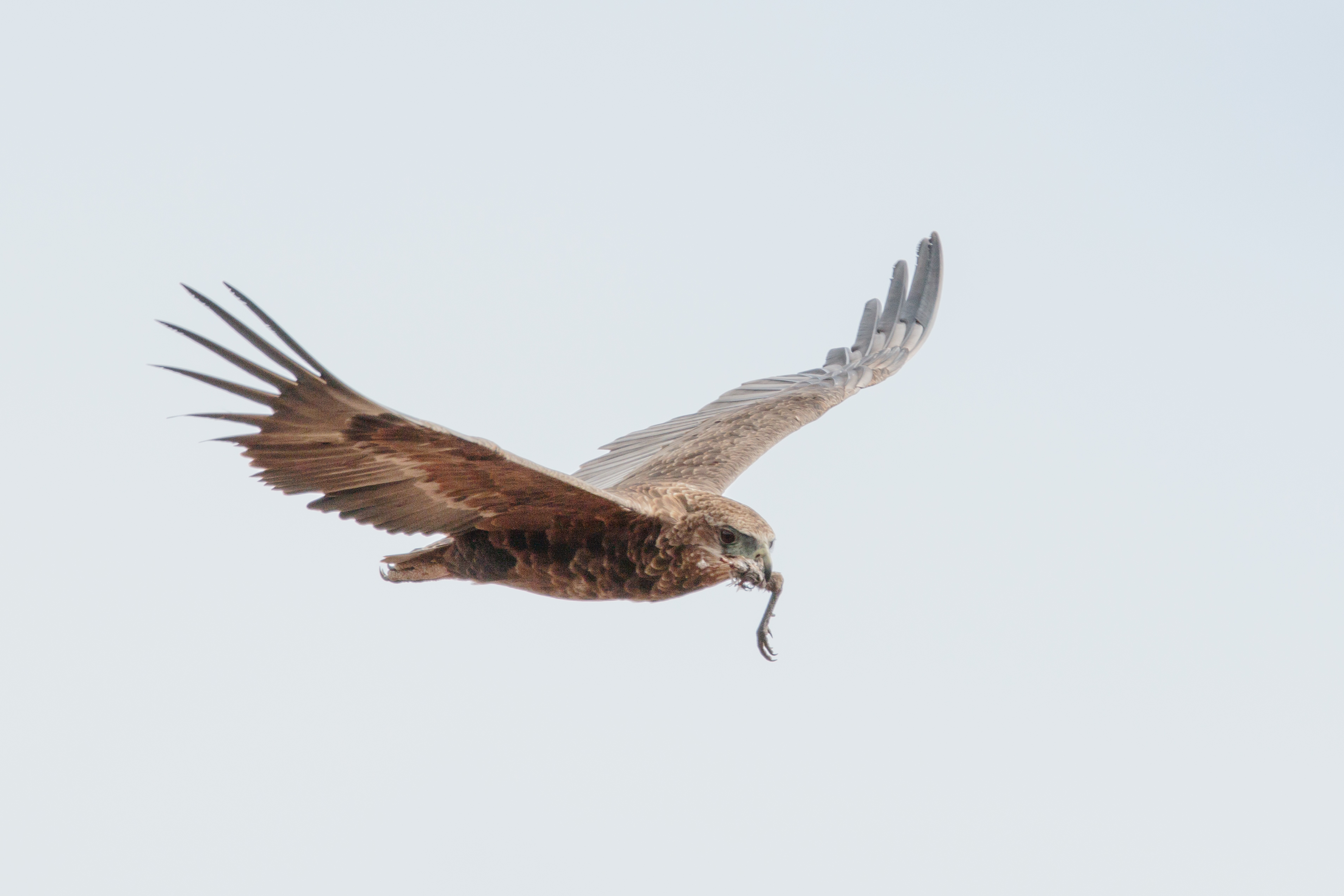
A juvenile bateleur flying while carrying a bird's foot in its mouth.

This bateleur is unusually conspicuous due to its propensity for gliding flights over favorable habitats in much of Africa. The bird spends a considerable amount of time on the wing, particularly in low-altitude flights. Due to the conspicuous behaviour and colorful plumage, the bateleur is frequently described in superlatives such as "one of the most beautiful and spectacular things that flies". This species tends to take off with unusually fast, shallow beats for a bird of this relative large size. After take-off, the bateleur sails at a mean speed of about 50 to 60 km/h (31 to 37 mph). They often rock from side-to-side with the wings held in a strong dihedral with very limiting flapping, vaguely recalling the flight of the American turkey vulture (Cathares aura) although the flight is generally more forceful, fast and acrobatic than that species and at times can be evocative of a huge falcon. Although the species tends to fly fairly low, bateleurs can soar and circle quite high as well. Engaged in its aforementioned dihedral flight it is often cants continuously from side-to-side, likely the origin of which it was given its common name (loosely "tumbler", "balancer" or "tightrope walker") of French derivation. Various flying embellishments may be undertaken nearly aseasonally. Although not typically given to forward somersault nor to loop-the-loop, bateleurs may with some regularity perform a rapid 360 degrees sideways roll. They are often given to flying with more embellishments when in the presence of another bateleur, even with juveniles provoking one another entirely uncoupled seemingly from breeding courtship or territorial displays. Typical home ranges of around 40 km^{2} (15 sq mi) were reported per pair in Kruger National Park and these were considered unusually small by overall species standards. Intruders to whom this behaviour is displayed always submit and submission is shown by retreating to a safe upper boundary (elevation). Males and females both display this behaviour in all stages of the breeding cycle. This behaviour is mainly shown to members of the same sex and particularly to non-adults, as it is thought that they may have a greater ability to take over another bird's territory (having greater competitive ability for limited food resources).

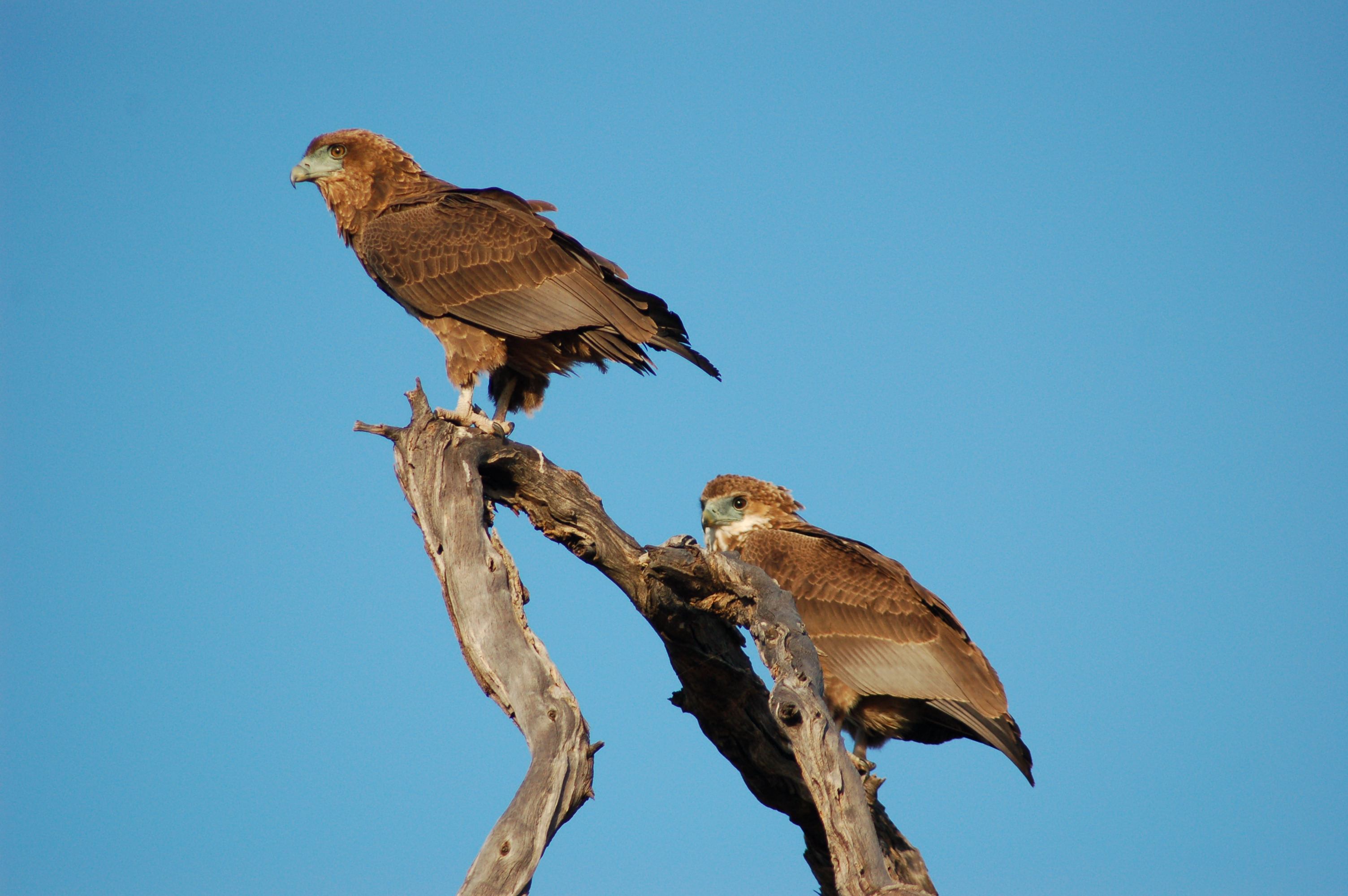
Juveniles, in Botswana

The bateleur is generally a solitary bird. However, juveniles may accompany one or both parents for about three months and loose congregations of as many as 40-50 or more have been record of mainly immatures. These tend to be aggregations of otherwise unassociated immature bateleurs attracted to rich feeding areas such as newly-discovered carrion, bush fires, recently burnt areas or temporary floods and occasionally by termite emergences. In the wild bateleurs are shy of man and sensitive to disturbance at the nest, easily abandoning the structure. In captivity, however, they become unusually tame. Bateleur eagles are among a group of raptors that secrete a clear, salty fluid from their nares whilst eating. According to Schmidt-Nielson's 1964 hypothesis, this is due to the general necessity for birds to use an extrarenal mechanism of salt secretion to aid water reabsorption.

=== Nomadism and dispersals ===
Generally, as in most raptors found as breeding residents in Africa, the bateleur is considered sedentary and territorial but it is a species that requires very large home ranges. However, in general the species neither as staunchly residential nor sedentary as many other Sub-Saharan African raptors. Both immature and sometimes adult bateleurs are considered clearly nomadic. At times, the bateleur is even regarded as an "irruptive or local migrant". Some regular north-to-south movements may occur in West Africa and may occur transequatorially in East Africa to avoid heavy rains. In Kruger, immatures are driven out by adults on territory during the breeding season and then often wander widely before returning for the non-breeding season. Recoveries of juveniles in southern Africa show that individuals have been recovered at assorted distances from their nests of origin ranging from as far as 30 to 285 km (19 to 177 mi) away. It was noted that in some cases, heavier rainfall may have caused farther afield dispersals.

=== Thermoregulation ===
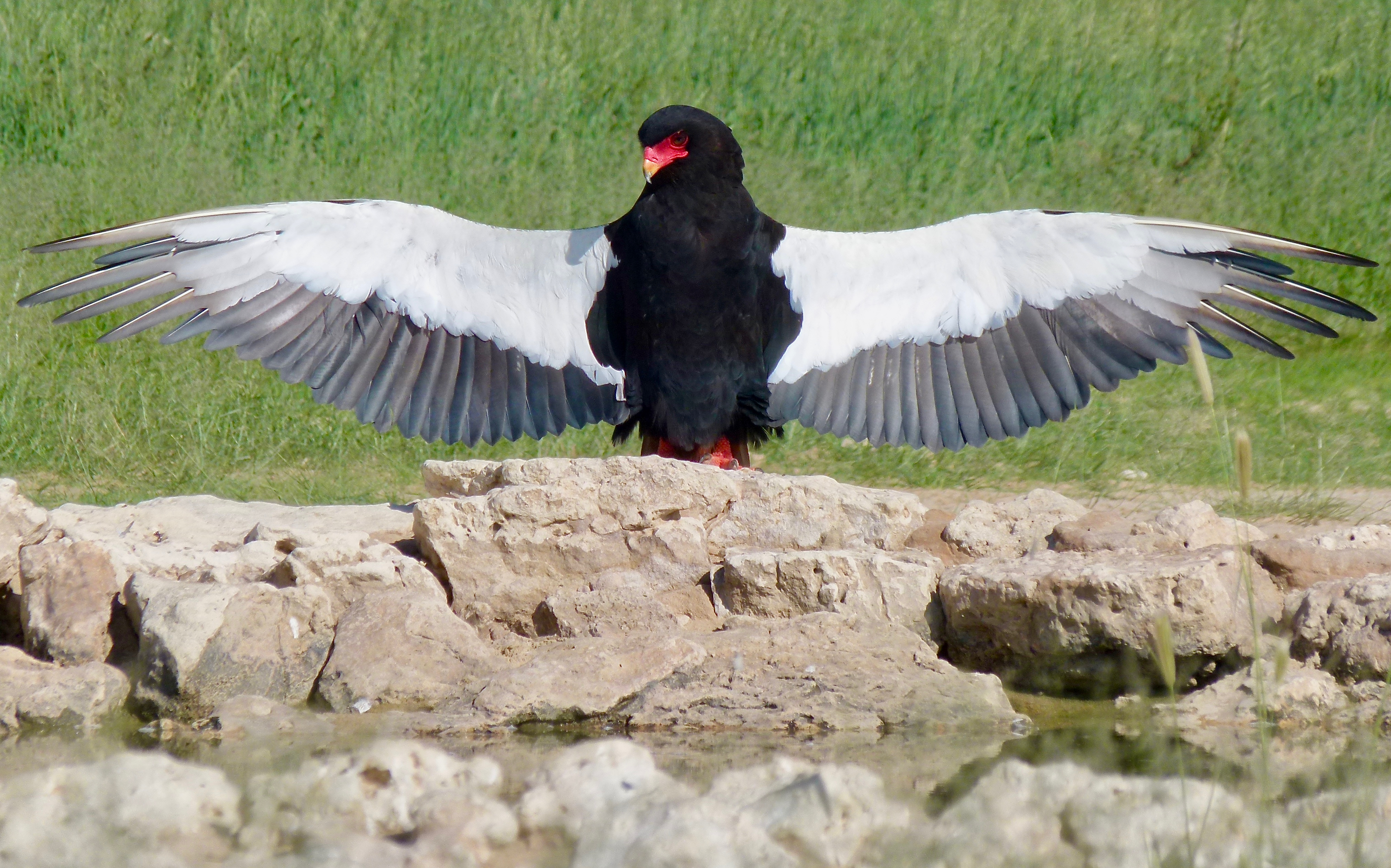
Male sunbathing by a waterhole

Bateleurs seem to devote an exceptional amount of time to thermoregulation frequently spending much of its day variously sunning, to warm up, and bathing, to cool off. These eagles are frequently seen to enter water-bodies for a bath and then open their wings to often sunbathe. Standing upright and holding their wings straight out to the sides and tipped vertically, a classic 'phoenix' pose as they turn to follow the sun. Bateleurs will stand on the ground with their wings spread, exposing the feathers to direct sunlight, warming the oils in the feathers. The bird will then spread the oils with its beak to improve its aerodynamics. In some countries, local nicknames of the species may include as the "Conifer eagle" or "Pine eagle" due to its feathers resembling a conifer cone when fluffed up and engaging in thermoregulatory behaviour. At times, this is described as a "striking heraldic posture". Bateleurs may also be seen "praying" allowing ants to crawl over the wings and feathers, collecting bits of food, dead feather and skin material. When covered in ants, the bateleur then ruffles its feathers, startling the ants, which react by secreting formic acid as self-defence. This in turn kills the ticks and fleas, possibly ridding the host of its parasites.

== Dietary biology ==
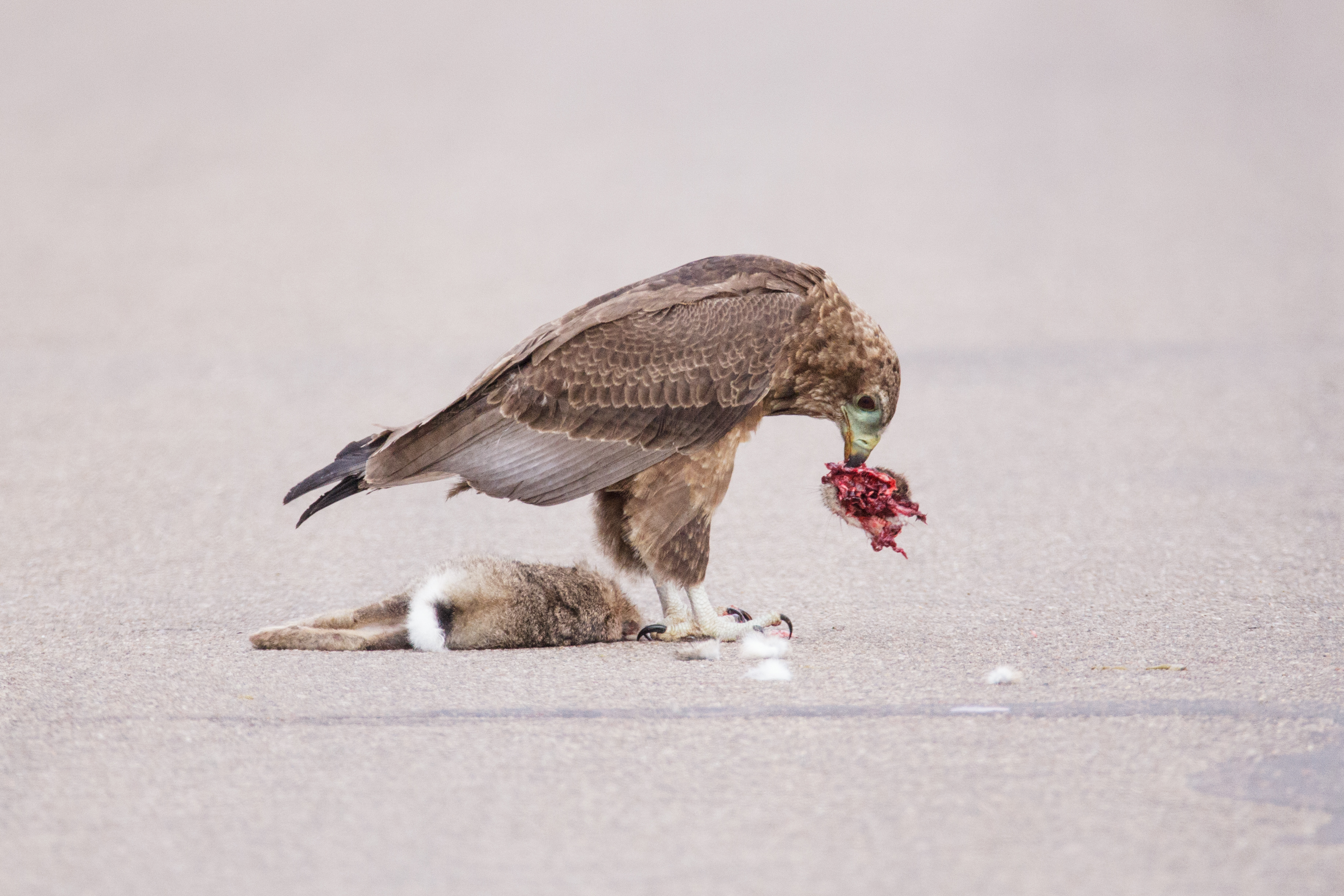
Juvenile feeding on a hare

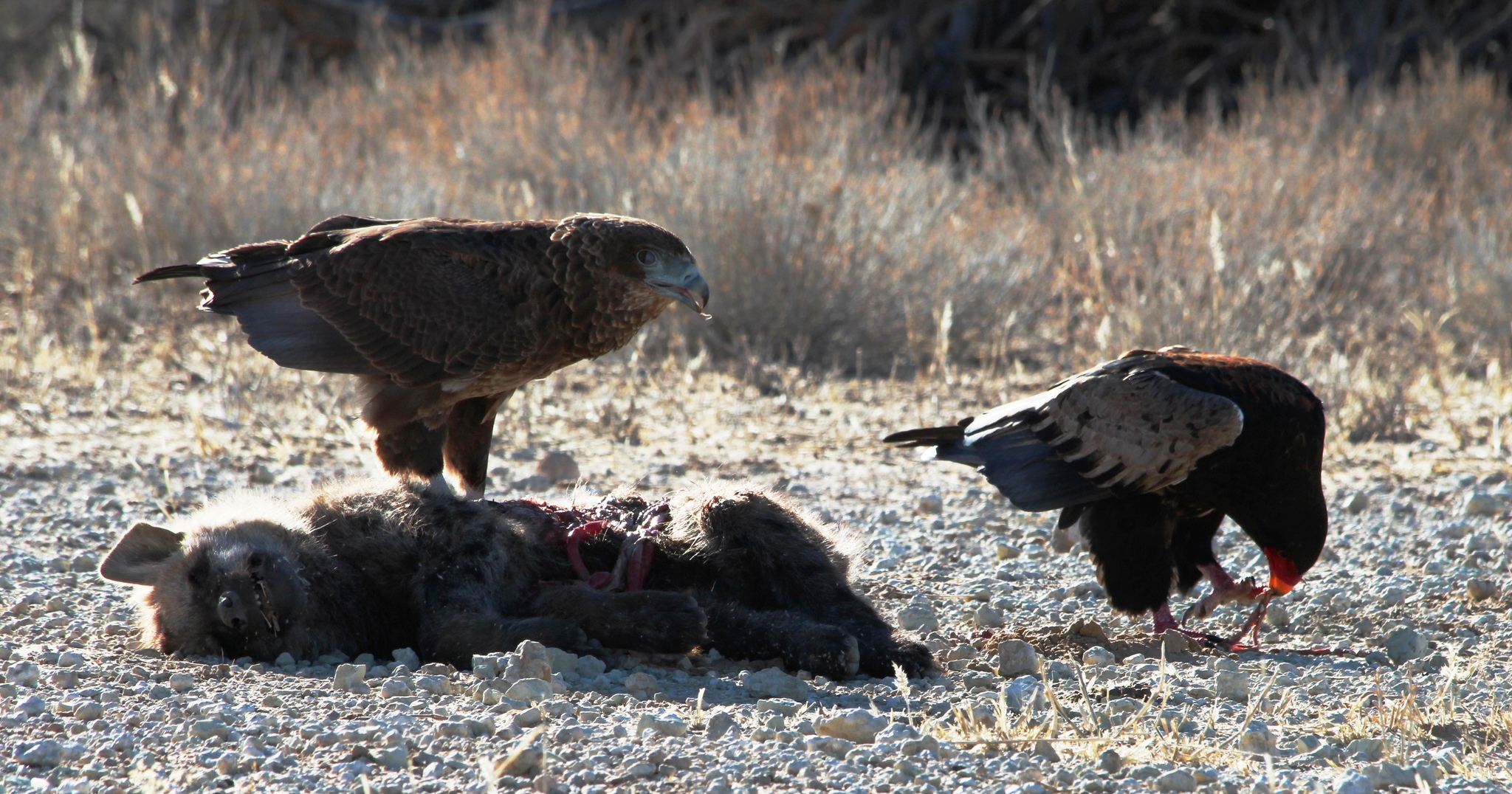
Juvenile and adult male scavenging on a spotted hyena carcass, in South Africa

The bateleur is a dietary generalist. This species generally forages from the flight, flying mostly low and straight whilst scanning the ground, periodically banking and retracing sections of the track when possible foods are spotted. Their hunting range can be truly enormous ranging in some cases up to 55 to 200 km^{2} (21 to 77 sq mi). Bateleurs may spend up to 8–9 hours or up to 80% of daylight on the wing, perhaps largely for hunting and foraging purposes, and have reported having even covered as much as 300 to 500 km (190 to 310 mi) in a single day. When potential prey or food is spotted, they then descend in tight spirals to check it out. The bateleur is a very effective discoverer of carrion at all times and often is the first to come to large carcasses or roadkills. Juveniles appear to attend large carrion much more than adults and dietary studies appear to support that carrion is rather more significant to the foods of juvenile and immature bateleurs compared to adults. Despite an aptitude for scavenging, descriptions of this eagle as "not a very rapacious species" are erroneous as it has been found to a highly powerful predator for its size and one that is often rather active at pursuing living prey, with seemingly most food consumed during the breeding season being prey that the bateleur has itself killed. Bateleurs kill most prey on the ground with a steep stoop on partially closed wings. On the evidence, they may alter their stoop onto prey with a slow drop with raised wings, rather in a gentle descent like a parachute, largely when taking slower moving prey such as some reptiles. Additionally, they can also take birds on the wing. As occasional kleptoparasites, they sometimes aerially pirate foods from other raptors. Alternately, they may try to intercept other raptors' kills while the raptor is feeding on them, whether it be on the ground, in a tree or on a rock, or even immediately after the kill is made. These piratical attacks are sometimes carried out against large carrion eaters like vultures and even against larger eagles, and in them, they may drive their target to the ground, with interlocking talons or trading shallow blows with their feet. Bateleurs also hunt insects by walking on the ground, particularly after grassfires, and will patrol for small carcasses alongside roads.

Bateleurs forage almost entirely based on opportunity and have no particular specialization on any particular prey type. As a result, a wide prey spectrum has been reported, with around 160 prey species known, they thus rival martial eagles (Polemaetus bellicosus) and perhaps just slightly behind tawny eagles (Aquila rapax) as the most diversified feeder known among African eagles. Among their prey, mammals, birds and reptiles, roughly in that order, seem to be considerably preferred over other prey taxa. Based on morphology, their long middle toes have been cited as an indication that they originally diversified to become a bird-eater but a rather small degree of sexual dimorphism between males and females indicates a preference for mammal eating. By the most complete picture of the bateleurs diet was a compilation study that compiled 1879 prey items from differing parts of the range. In it was found that bateleurs derived 54.6% of the diet from mammals, with perhaps two-thirds to about half of the diet being mammalian carrion, along with 23.7% of the diet being from birds, 17.8% from reptiles, 1.9% from fish, 1.8% from invertebrates and an extremely small amount (about 0.2%) of amphibian food. Predominantly, within the compilation study, preys were unidentified to species, with 58.4% of the carrion sources, 26.9% of live mammals, genera, or families, and 22.2% of birds unidentified to species.

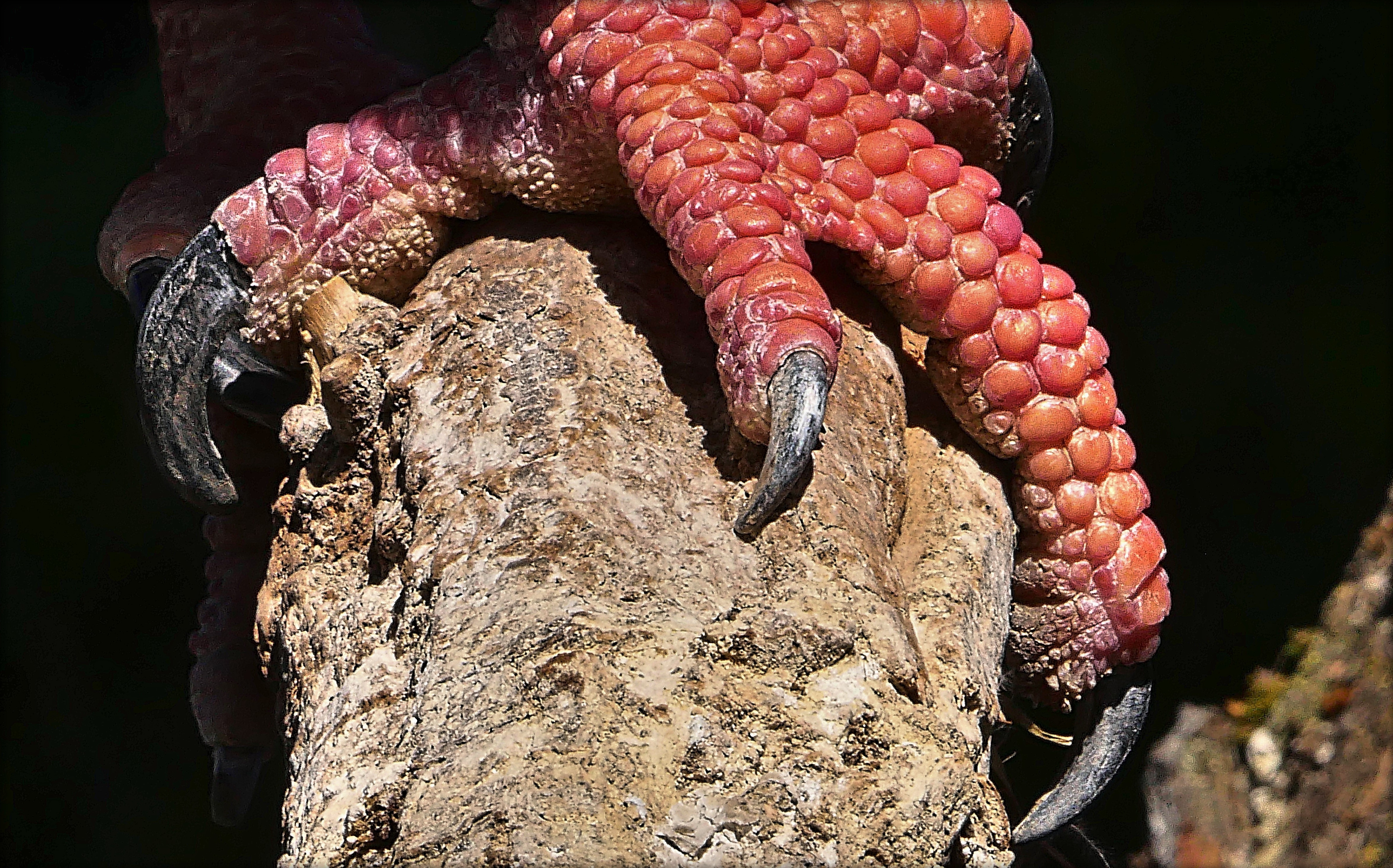
The markedly rough, large and short-clawed foot of a captive adult bateleur.

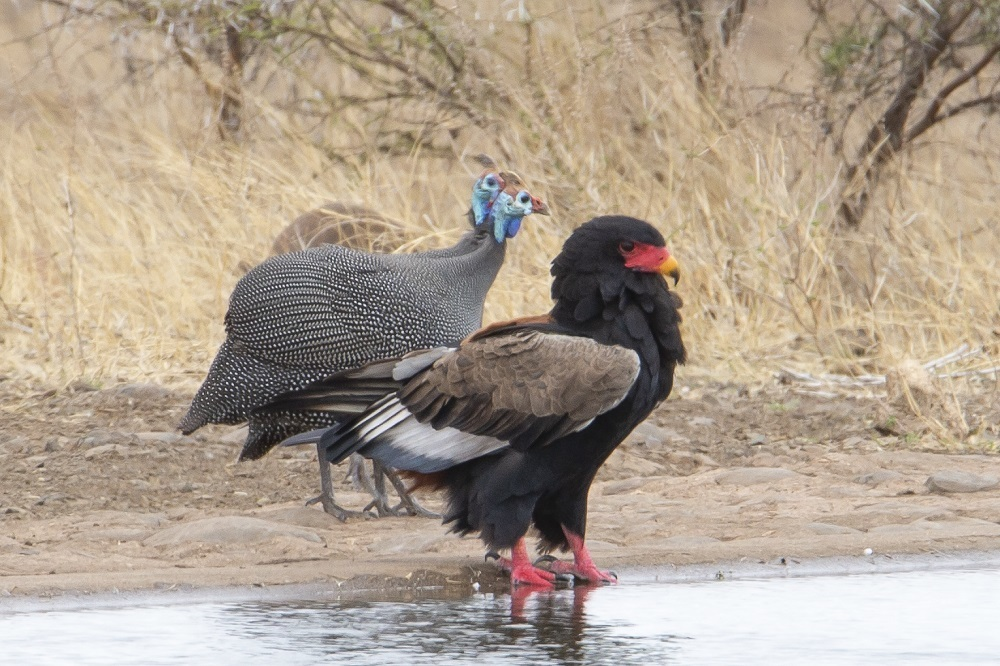
Female with helmeted guineafowl, one of the bateleur's prey species

Differing study areas show differing prey results for bateleurs. In a woodland-based study of nesting birds in Zimbabwe, 175 prey items were found for bateleurs with the diet seemingly dominated by prey appearing to be taken alive and relatively large prey at that. The primary prey in the study were found to be scrub hare (Lepus saxatilis) (at 26.3% of the prey by number), Cape hyrax (Procavia capensis) (at 10.3%), Gambian pouched rat (Cricetomys gambianus) (6.85%), brown greater galago (Otolemur crassicaudatus) (6.28%) and helmeted guineafowl (Numida meleagris) (4.57%). In the more hilly, rocky country of Zimbabwe, seemingly live prey was also preferred but a stronger prevalence of birds was detected among the 249 prey items. In this study, the main prey were scrub hares (22.8%), unidentified doves (10%), glossy starlings (6.72%), other small birds of around 100 g (3.5 oz) (6.69%), crested guineafowls (Guttera pucherani) (5.43%) and unidentified mammals (5.02%). In Kruger National Park, a much stronger preference for likely or verified carrion was detected in the bateleur's breeding season diet. Here, 731 food items in thornveld type habitat and 341 prey items in savanna type habitat were reviewed. It was estimated 31.6% of the diet was carrion was from medium-sized antelopes of around 20 to 40 kg (44 to 88 lb) in weight, followed by small carrion sources of around 8 to 15 kg (18 to 33 lb) to somewhat larger carrion from 54 kg (119 lb) impala (Aepyceros melampus). Beyond carrion, the Kruger food study found that 16.4% of the total diet consisted of unidentified live mammals, 3.73% each by assorted dove species and lilac-breasted rollers (Coracias caudatus), 3% by glossy starlings and 1.6% by skinks. Further variation was found in the diet farther north in Tsavo East National Park in Kenya. Of 139 prey items from the nest areas of 2 pairs, mostly live prey predominated again, here led by Kirk's dik-diks (Madoqua kirkii) at 19.42%, unidentified snakes at 18.7%, cape hares at 4.3%, Crocidura shrews at 3.59%, ungulate carrion at 3.59%, Streptopelia doves at 3.59%, common dwarf mongoose (Helogale parvula) at 2.87% and red-crested korhaan (Lophotis ruficrista) at 2.87%. Without statistics, Cangandala National Park in Angola, the prey species reported at nests included brown greater galago, greater cane rat (Thryonomys swinderianus), Gambian pouched rat, and unidentified hares. Unfortunately, detailed dietary studies have only been conducted in southern and eastern Africa and details of the diet are unknown elsewhere, however it is assumed the species is a generalist and opportunist throughout its range.

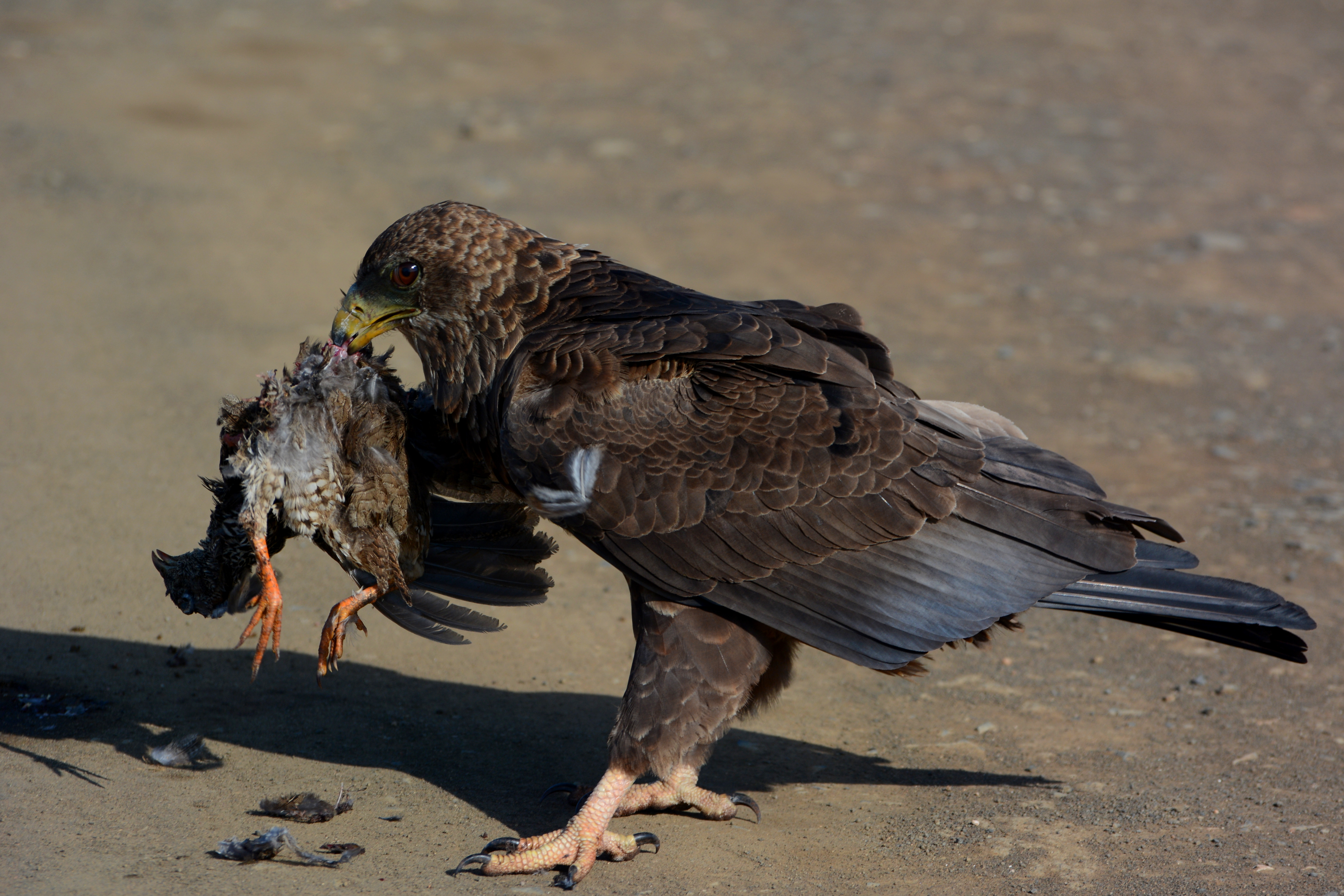
Juvenile bateleur with a Natal francolin

In general, a picture emerges that the primary food sources of bateleurs are live-taken medium-sized mammals, carrion of generally larger mammal species, rather smallish bird prey, and a small diversity of reptiles. When selecting mammals, small prey such as rodents and shrews are by no means neglected but a preference for relatively large rodents tends to be found. These may consist of assorted mice, gerbils and dormice to ground squirrels, bush squirrels and vlei rats to very large rodents such as Gambian pouched rats, greater and lesser cane rat (Thryonomys gregorianus) and South African springhares (Pedetes capensis) although certainly any consumption of adult Cape porcupine (Hystrix africaeaustralis) is derived from carrion. Additionally, most African species of hare as well as, more secondarily, hedgehogs and elephant shrews and a variety of smallish carnivorous mammals. The latter may include live prey species including several species of mongoose, from dwarf to banded mongoose (Mungos mungo) and Selous's mongoose (Paracynictis selousi), both about the same body mass as a bateleur, and at least four species of genets as well as striped polecats (Ictonyx striatus). Over 30 mammal species have been identified as foods for bateleurs exclusive from carrion, including various larger food species, with carrion of ungulates ranging in size from that of Sharpe's grysbok (Raphicerus sharpei) to African buffalo (Syncerus caffer) and the carrion of carnivorans from the size of jackals to that of lions (Panthera leo). In compilation studies, the most often fed-on ungulates by bateleurs that were identified to species were reported to be impala and steenbok (Raphicerus campestris), at 4.2% and 2.2% of the total foods, respectively . Bateleurs have been reported to opportunistically scavenge on human remains, as was reportedly witnessed during the South African Border War.

Outside of galagos, among primate foods most monkeys observed in the diet such as baboons and vervet monkeys (Chlorocebus pygerythrus) are thought to be largely scavenged as carrion. However, studies of king colobus (Colobus polykomos) and Angola colobus (Colobus angolensis) in Central and southeastern Africa (both where few details are known of bateleurs' diets), it was mentioned bateleurs may be a potential predator of troops based on the anti-predator activity and vocalizations of these species provoked by bateleurs. The bateleur, using its large, powerful feet, does not shy away from very large prey and has been known to regularly kill mammals heavier than itself including scrub hare estimated to weigh 2,600 g (5.7 lb), springhares estimated to weigh 3,000 g (6.6 lb), Cape hyrax estimated to weigh 3,800 g (8.4 lb), Kirk's dik diks estimated to weigh 4,000 g (8.8 lb) and greater cane rats estimated to weigh 4,500 g (9.9 lb). Even more impressive mammalian kills have been suspected, with instances where reportedly adults black-backed jackals (Canis mesomelas), honey badgers (Mellivora capensis), and aardwolf (Protelas cristatus), any of which may weigh around twice the aforementioned large mammal prey for bateleurs, may have been unexpectedly killed by bateleurs. Furthermore, an instance of attempted predation in Tanzania on an adult honey badger was witnessed, ending with both the bateleur and badger dying from the ensuing fight.

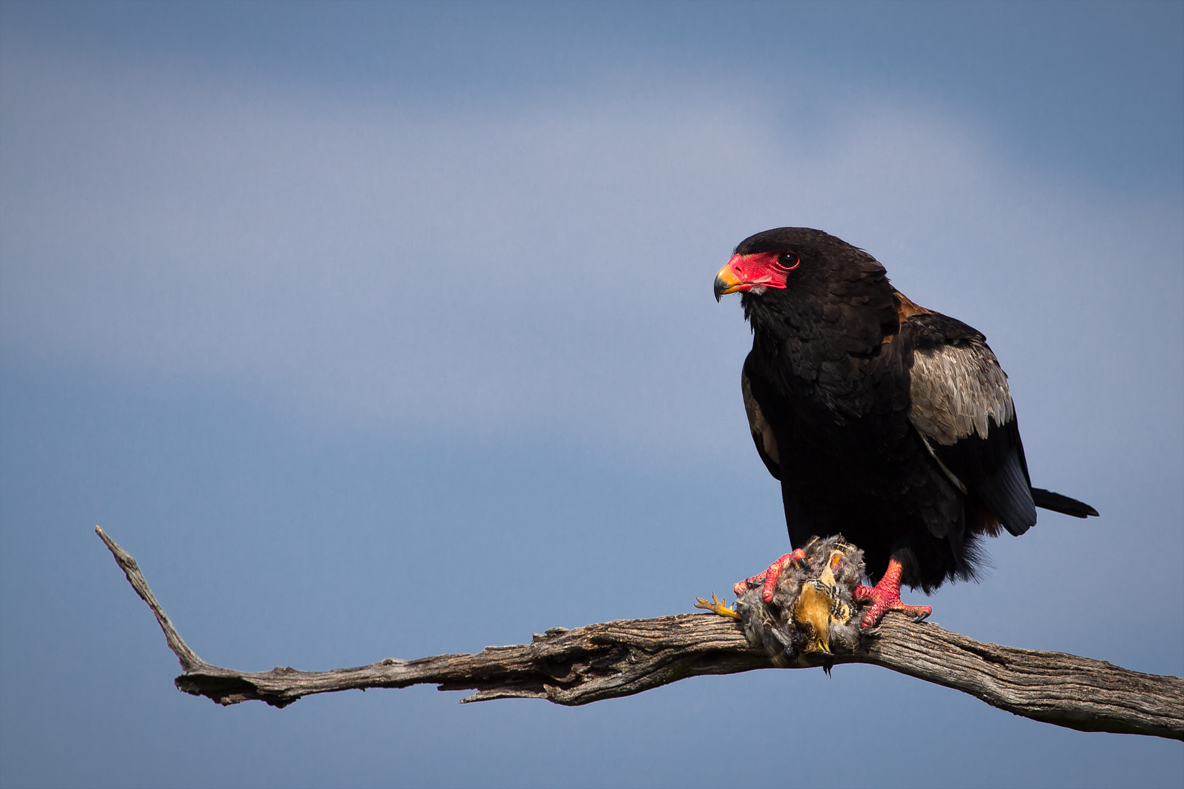
Male at Maasai Mara with a coqui francolin kill.

In all, a considerable diversity of birds and their eggs may be taken by bateleurs, perhaps around 80 species being known in their prey spectrum. They often focus on rather small, if normally live caught, birds compared to other eagles of a similar size. Bateleurs may show a special liking for pigeons and doves as prey, although only about a half dozen have been identified to species. Doves usually of the genus Streptopelia were found to be the most prominent avian prey in compilation studies, accounting for 17.6% of known avian prey and 4.25% of the total foods in several large bateleur food studies. Much other similar avian prey, commonly those weighing around 80 to 300 g (2.8 to 10.6 oz), including a surprising diversity of nightjars (perhaps since they are prone to end up as roadkill due to their predilection for resting on roads by night) and shorebirds like lapwings, other plovers, sandpipers and terns in addition to kingfishers (up to the size of the giant kingfisher (Megaceryle maxima)), rollers, hoopoes, small hornbills, parakeets and some passerines, usually those with a conspicuous presence on the savanna such as shrikes, weavers and starlings., Unlike many other eagles of similar or larger size, there are few instances of waterfowl or large waders (i.e. heron, storks, flamingoes, etc.) falling prey to bateleurs although at least one African spoonbill (Platalea alba) was recorded as bateleur prey. The largest typical avian prey tends to be assorted gamebirds, with most common guineafowl, spurfowl and francolin, smaller available species of bustard and some quail known in their diet. The largest of these avian prey species attacked by bateleurs top out around 1,200 to 1,800 g (2.6 to 4.0 lb). The reason for the disinterest in mid-sized to large avian prey of sizes comparable to some mammals and reptiles are known to have been taken by bateleurs is not clear, as the bateleur does not, in general, appear to shy away from difficult-to-capture birds nor to large and dangerous prey of other animal classes.

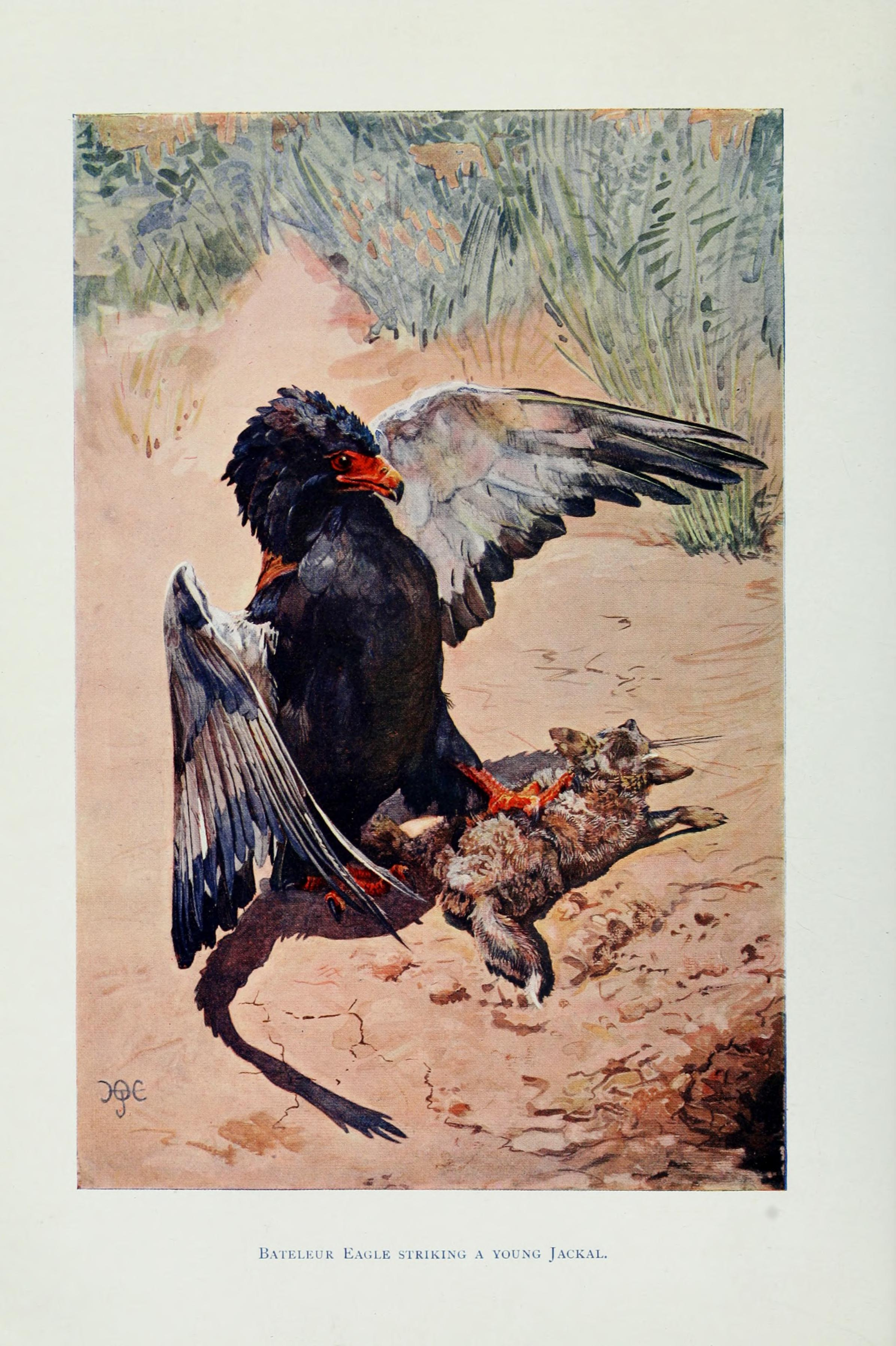
A bateleur depicted killing a young jackal.

The bateleur was once reported to be a very common predator of reptiles like their cousins the snake eagles. Although this is partially erroneous, bateleurs do not infrequently include reptiles in their diet. As much as 30% of the diet can be reptilian, mainly snakes. Some reptiles taken are small and innocuous such as a few species of plated lizards and a few species of colubrid snakes. However, like their cousins, the bateleur does not seem to shy away from venomous snakes nor other large or formidable reptiles. They have been known to take puff adder (Bitis arietans), boomslangs (Dispholidus typus), Egyptian cobras (Naja haje) and unidentified mambas, with the latter actually reported to be the most prominent known reptile prey in compilation studies, accounting for 18.9% of reported reptile prey and 3.35% of total prey. They can take sizable snakes, even adult puff adders which can potentially grow much heavier than the eagle themselves. However, the bateleur is not immune to venom nor is as well specialized to dispatching venomous snakes as are snake eagles, and, in one case, a mutual killing recorded between a puff adder and a bateleur was reported. Sizable, and far from defenseless, if not venomous reptiles known in the prey spectrum may include monitor lizards including Nile (Varanus niloticus) and savannah monitors (Varanus exanthematicus), some terrapins and tortoises and African rock pythons (Python sebae), although excepting small, young individuals which may be taken alive, these types of reptilian prey are perhaps in many cases consumed after they are already deceased, such as via roadkills. Nevertheless, bateleurs occasionally hunt small species of tortoises and even mature adult monitor lizards, and in one instance, live predation on an adult monitor lizard about 1.4 m (4.8 feet) in length has been reported. The bateleur is known to carry snakes to the nest in the style of ordinary snake eagles, with the dead snake being half swallowed and subsequently extracted by the capturing bird's mate, usually the female at the nest. Seldom identified prey may include assorted, and almost entirely unidentified, insects and crabs. Mostly swarming social insects seem to attract bateleurs, including locusts. It was recently verified that bateleurs will semi-regularly visit termite mounds to hunt down alates, although such feeding has been inferred in the past. Other prey can include a rare amphibian, none of which are known to be identified to species or family. Although fish are not typically taken, as much as 1.1% of the diet locally can consist of large Clarias catfish and it is likely that stranded fish are not neglected when opportuned upon.

=== Interspecific predatory relationships ===
The bateleur seems to adapt to living in the highly competitive continent of Africa by foraging with a lack of specialization, with a seeming lack of discrimination regarding the prey item/food source nor its origin although its highly aerial and free-ranging foraging mode is quite unique. The bateleur, nonetheless, must face considerable and intense competition from other birds of prey especially. The range of other raptors, especially other eagles and vultures, may appear to be daunting. One of the most similar eagles to regularly encounter the bateleur is the tawny eagle. These two species overlap in many significant ways, being similar in body mass and predatory prowess as well as in nesting habitat, tendency to attack a wide size range of prey (including large prey) and general disposition. Furthermore, both of these eagles show ability to freely change feeding methods between live predation, scavenging on carrion and piracy. In Tsavo East National Park, bateleurs were studied along with tawny eagles, significantly larger martial eagles and slightly smaller African hawk-eagles (Aquila spilogaster). Here all four largish eagles relied primarily upon Kirk's dik dik for food but were mostly slightly staggered in breeding season, with the bateleur nesting on average earlier than the other eagles. The diet was by far most similar with that tawny eagle in Tsavo East, overlapping 66% in prey species and 72% in prey weight. Meanwhile, the diet overlapped 32% in species and 50% in weight with martial eagles and 37% in species and 57% in weight with African hawk-eagles. The one discrepancy, which is noted in other studies as well, is that the bateleur tends to focus on smaller birds than tawny eagles when selecting avian prey. Bateleurs also bear an advantage over tawny eagles in their ability forage in open habitats, with the absence of perches, due to their aerial foraging methods. However, data indicates that the tawny eagles is dominant over bateleurs typically at disputed kills or carrion. One study accrued 26 instances of tawny eagles displacing bateleurs against only 5 where bateleurs displaced tawny eagles, giving illustration to the tawny eagles dominance. Frequently, the bateleur waits until the tawny eagle is done eating before it does so itself if both are at a carcass site.

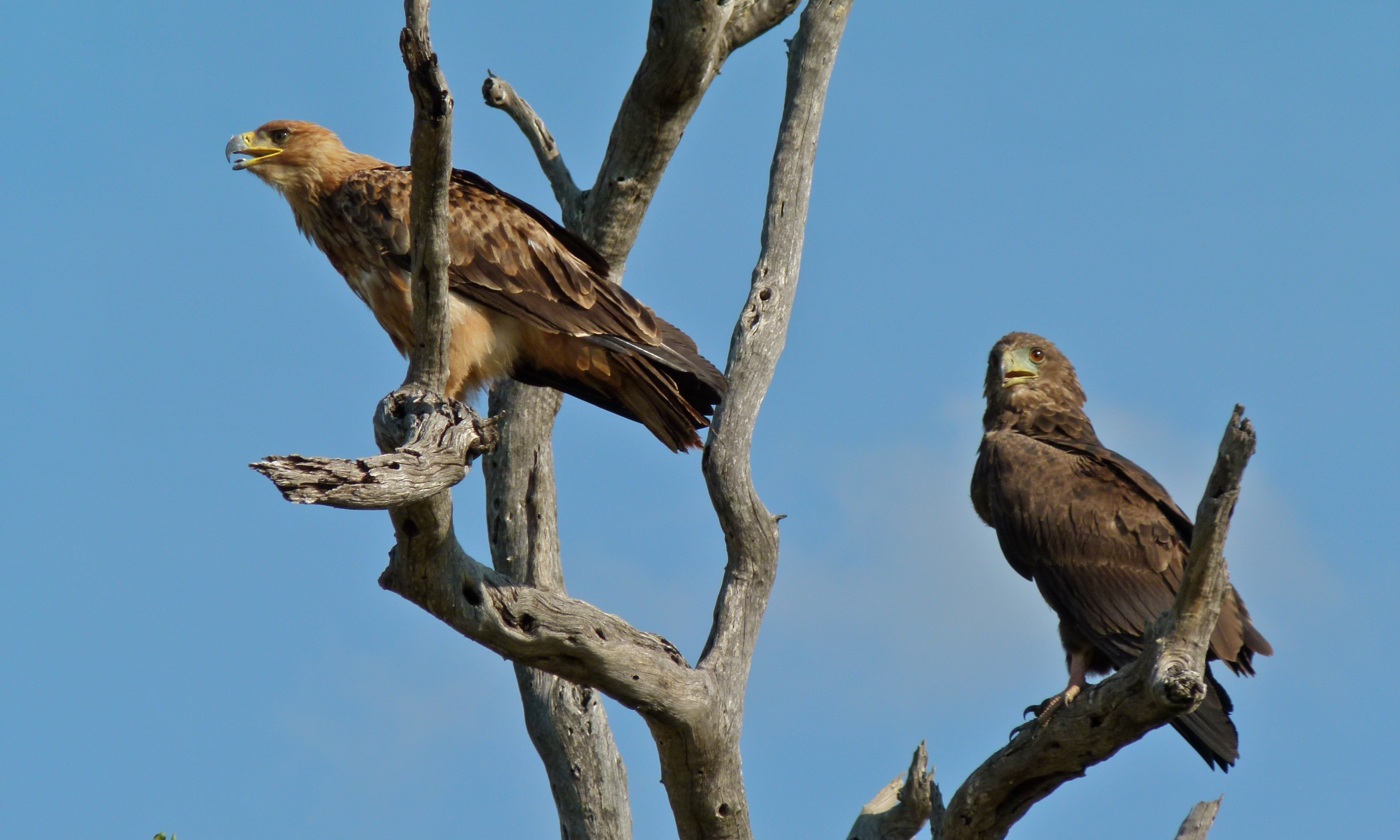
A juvenile bateleur with a tawny eagle (Aquila rapax), a similar eagle in life history.

Bateleurs may encounter a huge range of other scavengers when coming to carrion. Most clearly vultures are often present at carrion. However, due to their smaller size, the tawny eagle and especially the bateleur can begin foraging for carrion earlier in the morning, while the vultures must wait for updrafts to undertake flight. Bateleurs in particular are considered most likely to find a carcass first before other scavengers. This was verified in a study in Maasai Mara where it was additionally found that scavengers kept to body size in terms of hierarchy. The descending order of scavenger dominance was stated to rank starting with the spotted hyenas (Crocuta croctua) at the top and black-backed jackals and feral dogs (Canis lupus familiaris), then the lappet-faced vulture (Torgos tracheliotos), the Rüppell's vulture (Gyps rueppellii), followed by all other vultures with the tawny eagle and the bateleur in the second most and the most subordinate scavenger positions. Therefore, the bateleur is considered a scavenger with high search efficiency but low competitive ability. However, the bateleur does benefit from the larger scavengers, being less able to access a large carcass, at best feeding on the eyes of said carcass unless it is already otherwise torn asunder such as large carnivore prey or roadkills. With the epidemic-level reduction of vultures in Africa, it was found in Maasai Mara that both bateleurs and tawny eagles have been found to actually increase in sighting frequency in sync with the vanishing numbers of remaining vultures, with the number of bateleur sightings increasing by 52%. To the contrary of the expected hierarchy, cases are known where bateleurs have attacked and dominated much larger scavenging birds including white-backed vultures (Gyps africanus) and bearded vulures (Gypaetus barbatus), with these having been successfully displaced or lost carrion to a bateleur. Even more impressively, cases where bateleurs interacting with much larger, more powerful martial eagles have involved instances where the bateleurs have attacked, pirated and even brought to ground in clashes that appear to end in a drawl. However, the martial eagle occupies a notably higher trophic level than the bateleurs and is not considered subservient to bateleurs due its even greater predatory prowess. Similarly, instances of considerable competition have been reported between bateleurs and African fish eagles (Haliaeetus vocifer), which are similarly prone to opportunistic piracy and aggressive interspecific relations. However, the two species are partitioned by habitat and primary prey.

It is uncommon-to-rare but not unprecedented that bateleurs may prey on other raptors. Bateleurs have been documented preying on black-winged kites (Elanus caeruleus), wintering lesser spotted eagles (Clanga pomarina), gabar goshawks (Micronisus gabar), barn owls (Tyto alba), spotted eagle-owls (Bubo africanus) and peregrine falcons (Falco peregrinus). Additionally, they were considered a likely potential predator upon nestlings of the white-backed vulture. Certainly the most impressive instance of intraguild predation documented as committed by bateleurs is when one was seen killing an adult Verreaux's eagle owl (Bubo lacteus), a formidable top predator among owls and possibly the largest avian prey ever reported for a bateleur. The predators of mature bateleurs themselves are not well-documented and in fact, Verreaux's eagle owls may the only species verified to repeatedly prey upon bateleurs, but this is probably due to rare predator identification at bateleur nests. Bateleurs are usually considered apex predators. By contrast, bateleur nestlings are vulnerable to predation compared to other raptors. Though adult bateleurs can simply leave the nest or crouch below the nest rim to reduce nest detectability to many predators, they can be very aggressive toward conspecifics as well as other raptors, and occasionally human intruders. However, due to their unique foraging mode which takes them far from the nest for long periods of the day, the physical defense is largely unable. Thus, chicks are presumed to be vulnerable to a huge range of predators although very few are properly identified. Based on other eagles in Africa, these are likely to include various sizes of mammalian carnivores, snakes, monitors and various birds of prey, including even perhaps much smaller species and vultures due to the long periods bateleur eaglets are left unprotected. An unprecedented instance of a leopard catching an adult Bateleur was filmed in Botswana.

== Breeding ==
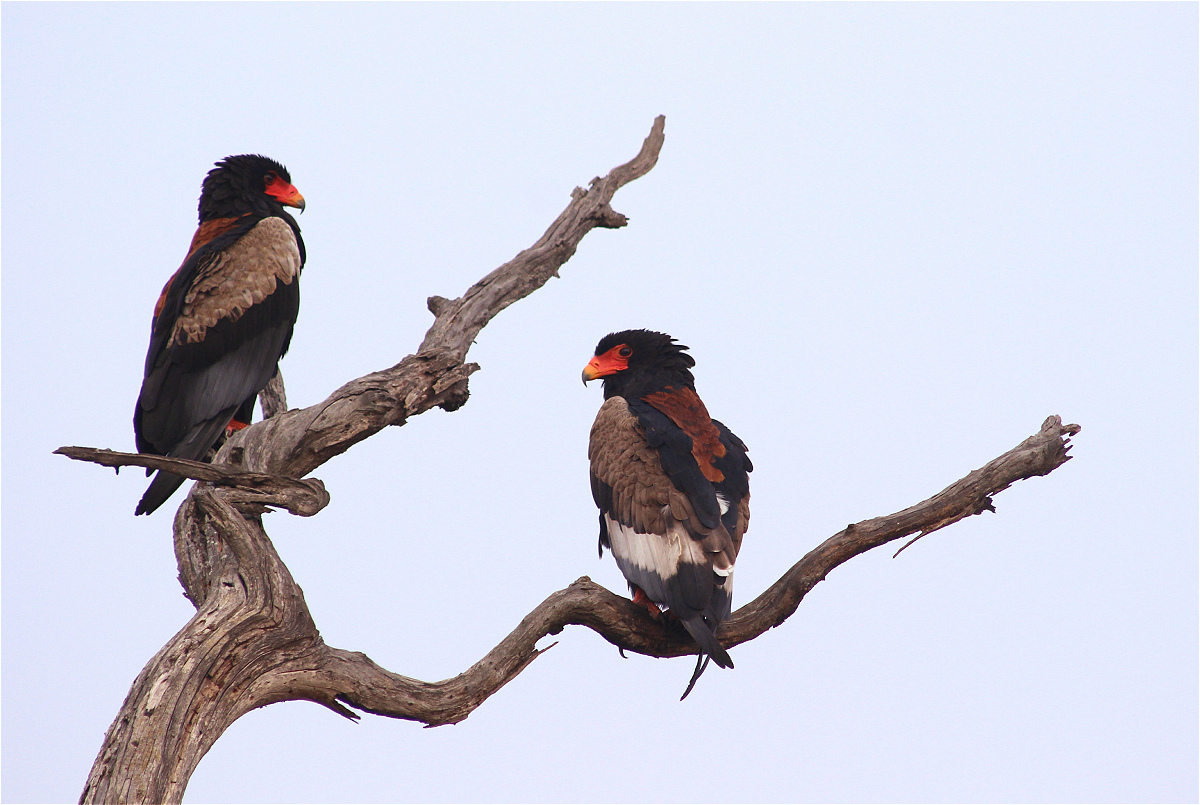
Male (left) and female (right) pair, in South Africa

Bateleurs are long-lived species, slow-maturing, slow-breeding species, Bateleurs court each other or re-establish existing pair bonds what is considered, a "spectacular" courtship display. During the courtship display, an exaggerated flight is undertaken, in which the male dives down at the female who rolls to present him her claws. Additionally, he sometimes flies with legs dangling loosely, during which the wings may be flapped to create a conspicuous whup-whup-whup noise like a loose sail in the breeze. Very infrequently, a male bateleur may make a 360 degree lateral roll, accompanied by loud whup-whup noises, at times display may involve 2 males with a single female, but during breeding only one male is usually actively courting. A further chasing flight reported is not necessarily nuptial and may be performed by birds of the same size, by an adult or an immature and in some cases is linked to the sociality of the species. The bateleur is usually rather monogamous and likely, with the survivorship of each mate, mates for life. However, rare instances of possible polygyny have been reported. The bateleur breeding season tends to fall from September to May in West Africa, however juveniles have also been recorded in Mauritania in September. Reportedly, the nesting season can be virtually any month in East Africa but chiefly is some time around December–August, which also is the corresponding peak breeding time in Southern Africa, with nesting as late as August to October in the southern stretches of the continent considered unusual. In Somalia, the breeding season however fell from July to December while in Ethiopia there was no detectable peak whatsoever.

=== Nests ===
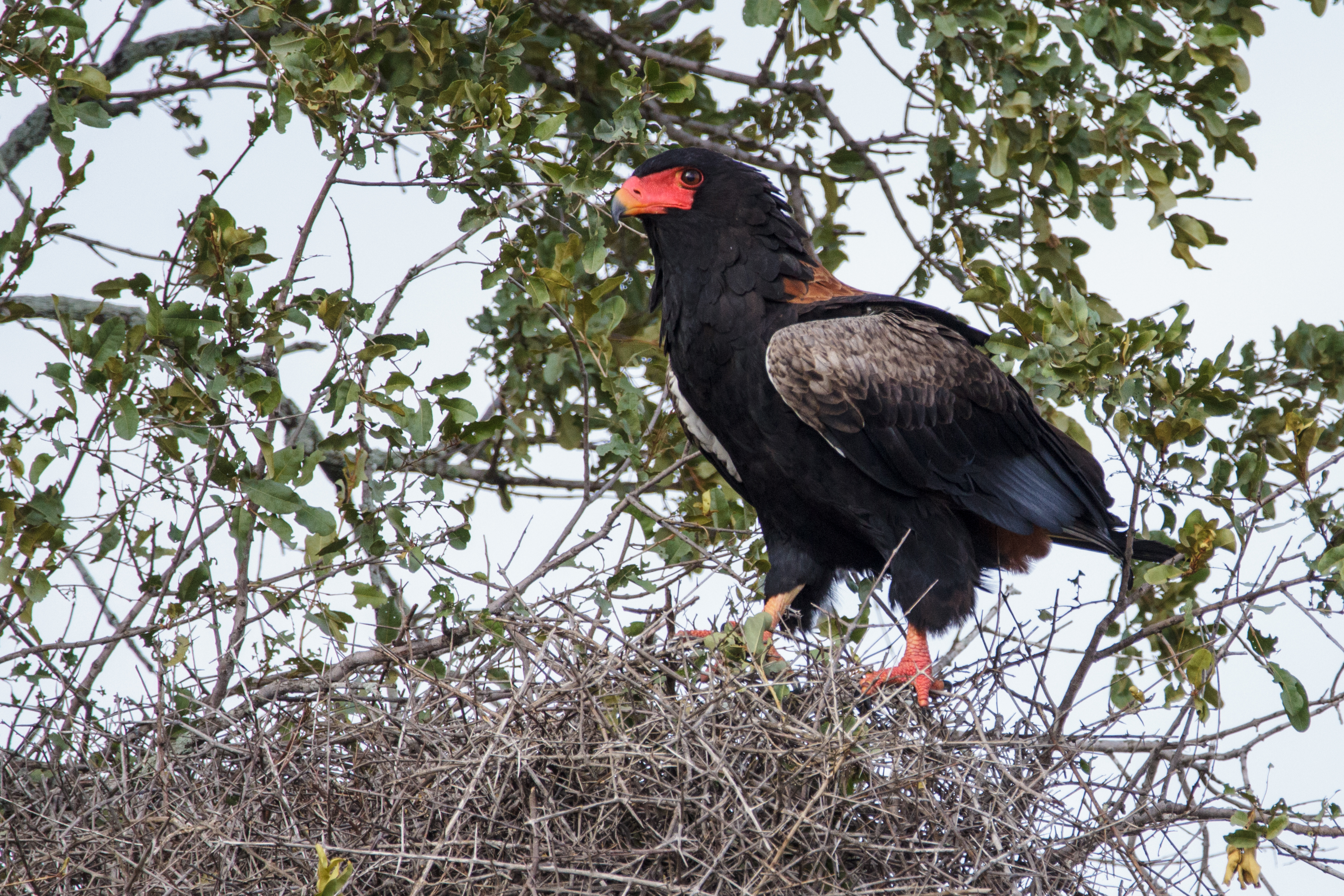
A male bateleur at its nest.

Nests are located in fairly large trees, sometimes near a watercourse, either in hilly terrain or open flat country. At times, bateleurs are adaptable and perhaps even favor nesting near manmade openings such as roads or paths. Nests are typically at 10 to 15 m (33 to 49 ft) above the ground but in extreme may be from 7 to 25 m (23 to 82 ft) high. The nest is normally within the canopy in the fork of the main trunk or a large lateral branch so that it is shaded for much of the day. A variety of tree species may be used. In southern Africa, favored trees tend to Adansonia and especially Acacia trees. Senegalia nigrescens trees may too be popular. Bateleurs usually nest on structures made by themselves but one nest was reported in on a buffalo weaver nest and was difficult to observe. Furthermore, old nests of other birds may be used, in one case a Wahlberg's eagle (Hieraaetus wahlbergi) nest taken over and added to deepen it. The nest is a solid structure of medium-sized sticks, measuring about 60 cm (24 in) across, 30 cm (12 in) deep with a leafy cup of about 25 cm (9.8 in) across. Snake eagles and their kin tend to build relatively small if bulky nests relative to their size and the bateleur is no exception, with their nest size being about half that in diameter of a similarly-sized eagle like the tawny eagle. Nests tend to be lined with green leaves by the bateleur pair. Both sexes of bateleur are known to contribute to the building or repair of a nest, a process that typically takes about 1–2 months, though sometimes nest construction can be reportedly protracted even in years where no breeding occurs. They often subsequently use a new nest in the same general area in consecutive breeding seasons, usually not more than 1 to 3 km (0.62 to 1.86 mi) away, and may reuse a nest they built previously. There is much variation in this regard, from 1 nest being used in 5 consecutive years to no nest reusage in 3 recorded years. Nests built by bateleurs tend to be favored by lanner falcons (Falco biarmicus), probably in part because the eagle's young are fledged by July–August when lanners tend to lay; however 1 nestling was persistently mobbed by a lanner during its last week at the nest. In ranching country in Zimbabwe, nests are spaced 13 to 16 km (8.1 to 9.9 mi) apart. In Mozambique, nesting spacing was found to be about 5 km (3.1 mi).

=== Eggs and development of young ===
In this species, only one egg is ever laid. Their eggs are quite large for the size of the bird, being broadly oval and usually an unspotted chalky white but sometimes with a few red stains or indistinct reddish markings, which may be cosmetic from feeding and defecating of the parents. The bateleur's egg is quite similar in size and coloration to most snake eagles, which also generally lay a single egg. A bateleur egg may measure from 74.2 to 87 mm (2.92 to 3.43 in) in height, with an average of 77.4 mm (3.05 in) in a sample of 24 and 79.1 mm (3.11 in) in a sample of 50, by 57 to 68.1 mm (2.24 to 2.68 in) in diameter, with an average of 62.3 mm (2.45 in) in 24 and 62.7 mm (2.47 in) in 50. The eggs are comparable in size to those of martial and crowned eagles (Stephanoaetus cornatus), eagles of easily up to twice the body size of a bateleur. The female bateleur normally incubates alone, though rarely males are seen to do so as well. The female is fed by the male but takes spells off in which she probably feeds on her own kills and the male may take over incubation, although reports of instances where he may do the majority of incubation are probably inaccurate. While the elastic breeding season suggests an indifference to climatic concerns relative to the wet season and dry season, the bateleur is usually considered an eagle that lays earlier in the year than overlapping eagles. The incubation stage lasts for 52 to 59 days, averaging about 55 days, and may be the longest of any African raptor. Reports of incubation lasting for only 42–43 days are probably erroneous.

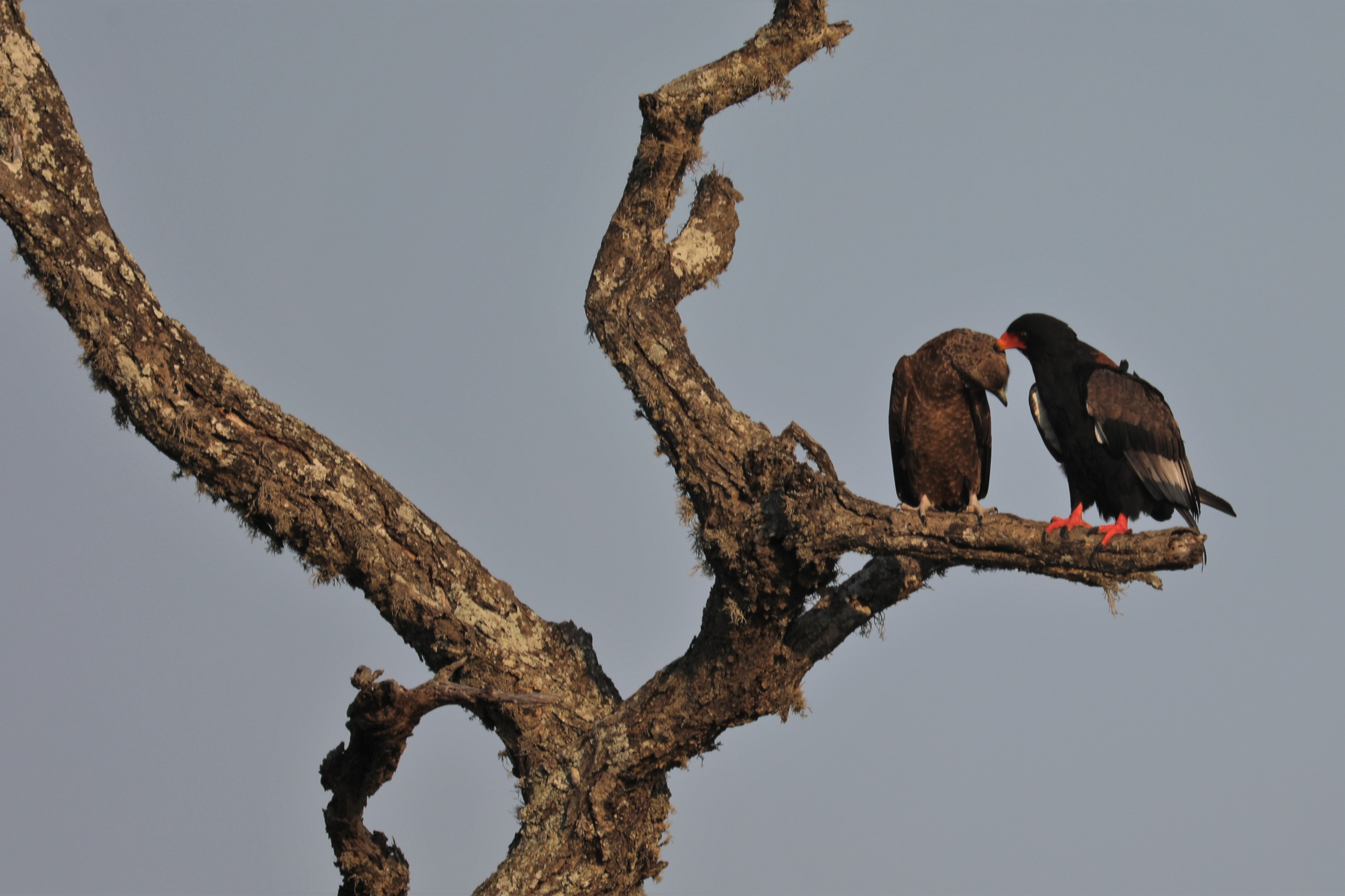
Female preening young

The hatchling is highly altricial and very feeble at first, perhaps even more so than most other eagles, being unable to lift its own heavy head and possesses a deeply wrinkled cere. The small eaglet is initially covered in creamy down with a chocolate-brown patch behind the eye that matches the rest of the down colour above with creamy flanks. At about 2 weeks, the young eaglet becomes somewhat more active and the down develops a patchy appearance. At 3 weeks, the eaglet has a downy white head but the down colour above is dark brown, with the first brown feathers sprouting on back of head, secondaries and scapulars. By 4 weeks, they no longer have any white down and brown feathers grow, especially the back and wing ones; while a week later, the feathers continue emerge and the secondaries outgrow the primaries. Thence at 7 weeks, the feathering of the foreparts occurs rapidly, being complete by 35 days, but the wing and tail feathers are still growing, the last remaining down being on underwing coverts. The young eaglet resembles those of snake eagles in appearance and feather growth pattern, particularly the retarded growth of the primary feathers, and in general coloring become greyer as the eaglet ages. The nestling may first stand at about 5 weeks as well as engage in wing-flapping. Pre-independence juveniles may perch or lie in prone position before they can fly well. The stage at which the young first feeds itself is dictated by what prey is brought; if it is large, the parents will feed the young to 40 days, but small fragments will be eaten unaided by the downy young. Around 6 weeks is when the eaglet can typically feed itself for the first time. At 9 weeks, eaglet bateleurs have been recorded doing effective threat displays against humans. Fledgling typically occurs around 90–125 days with reported extremes at as little as 93 to as much as 194 days. The young often returns to the nest after its first flight and continues to do so. The young bateleurs become independent quickly within about a week in some cases and in others remain closely by and dependent on their parents for about 2–4 months. The young bateleurs may follow their parents around in flight until they are fed. Coaxing behaviour by parents has been recorded (keeping away food until they fly to it, perhaps gradually encouraging the young eagle to go farther afield). After leaving the nest area, the young bateleurs often wander widely, for example one was recorded to have covered 1,347 km^{2} (520 sq mi). When soaring near another bateleur nest, young bateleurs are often fiercely attacked by adult males. There are some reports, even frequent reports it is said, of immature bateleurs staying to help incubate the eggs although generally this presumably rare.

=== Parental behaviour ===
When the nest is approached, at times bateleurs will react forcibly, engaging in aggressive barks, sometimes diving down from flight at the intruder with loud flapping wings. When disturbed in this way, however bateleurs very often depart and they will often not return to the nest for up to several hours. Generally, it seems to be more likely than almost any other African eagle to desert their young. During the incubation and nestling period, the male is more demonstrative than the female at the nest, sometimes doing the distraction display and regular dive-bomb attacks if the nest tree is climbed, the female more commonly flies away in the distance. Once a lone male baboon climbed a nest tree, the female bateleur sat and incubated while the male dive bombed it. When this failed to drive it off, the male settled on a branch between the baboon and the nest and threatened the monkey with raised wings, the baboon was never dislodged but did not harass the eagles at the nest. Bateleur parents are highly sensitive to breeding from human disturbance, oddly they may permit and adapt to regular inspections of the nest but resent an attempts to hide or conceal photographic equipment nearby and regularly desert the nest even with a small nestling, thus nest photography should be avoided. The ease with which bateleurs are flushed away from their nest appears to lead to uncommonly high nest predation rates, while many other eagle, including from other parts of the world, either sit tightly on their nest until the danger level becomes too high or attack ferociously at the potential threat. The nestling is careful tended to by female, as she is at the nest 82% of the time up to the time the eaglet is 10 days in one Kenya study, her attendance thence drops to 47% from 10–20 days, then after 30 days, dropped to about 5% and from 60 days about 1%. When the young is at later stages of maturity, the female tends to only engage in very brief prey deliveries. Both sexes bring prey and feed the young though the male takes a bigger share of this than in many eagles. After 30 days, the eaglet is often left by itself on the nest throughout the night. The eaglet is fed nearly every day early on but only every 2–3 days later on, especially after leaving the nest.

=== Breeding success and failures ===
It is estimated that the bateleur produces a mean of 0.47 chicks per nest per year. In East Africa, the bateleur tends not to breed every year and the replacement rate is about 0.5 per annum. In southern Africa, the bateleur typically breeds every year whether or not they are successful in raising their eaglet. At 4 nests in Zimbabwe, a replacement rate of 0.81 young per pair per annum, with local figures often being higher where they live more free from human disturbance. It was found that Zimbabwe failures were only known to be from infertile or lost eggs. In Kruger National Park, the predation of Verreaux's eagle-owls may considerably lower nesting success. Furthermore in Kruger, it was found that 33% of the population of bateleurs were young birds while the remaining 67% were adults, meaning that younger birds are presumably underpopulated. Elsewhere, even lower numbers, around 25-30%, of the population is young bateleurs. The population, or at least in southern Africa, seems to be roughly even in terms of sex ratio, with an even number of males and females. In the Kalahari Gemsbok National Park, 13 pairs of bateleurs were recorded to produce only 0.33 young per pair. There was evidence of a 13% decline in active nesting territories of bateleurs in the Kalahari Gemsbok area during the seven year study, and at least a 40% decline over the previous 10 years. Vacated nesting territories were not reoccupied by the species. There was found to be seemingly no safe buffer zone around the park, due perhaps to persecution in the adjacent farmlands, when potential mortality of foraging bateleur from the protected park enter these areas, as well as nesting site disturbance, could have been part of the reason for this decline. Poisoned and suspected poisoned bateleurs have been found in the Park during the study period. The few that survive their early years may expect a mean estimated lifespan of around 12–14 years and in some cases may manage to live as long as 27 years. The annual adult survival rate is estimated at 95%, while the annual juvenile survival rate is estimated at 75%.

== Conservation ==
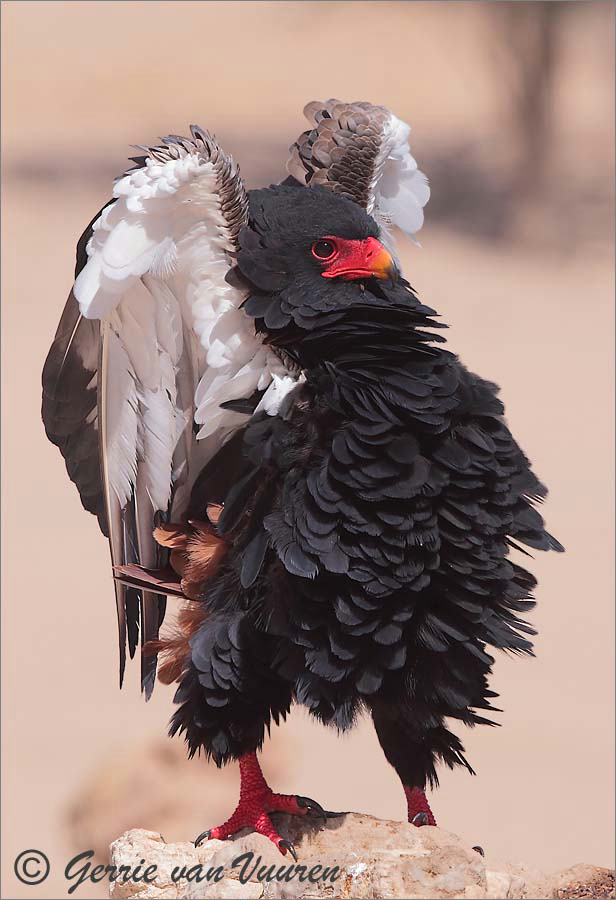
A bateleur in "heraldic" pose.

Bateleurs are a wide ranging species but have shown rather strong declines. Per estimates from the 1990s, extrapolated from an average of 150 km^{2} (58 sq mi) per pair, it was projected that the total population could have been around 180,000 birds including young ones. However, it is likely that the species numbers far lower than that. Currently, the IUCN estimates broadly from 10,000 to 100,000 total individuals. The numbers in Southern Africa have shown the most dramatic and drastic known reductions. At one time, the species numbers at 2000-2500 pairs in the former Transvaal Province alone which was down to around 420 to 470 pairs by the 1990s. More recently it was estimated that there are less than 700 pairs in the entire region of Southern Africa, although that number may be too excessively conservative. In all the bateleur has declined by an estimated 75% in Southern Africa. The species is considered threatened in Zimbabwe, Namibia, Eswatini and South Africa and still considered not uncommon but probably declining in Malawi, Zambia, Mozambique and Botswana. Declines are not endemic to Southern Africa for bateleurs, with declines strongly detected as well in Ivory Coast and Sudan. Additional countries that have reported strongly declining numbers are in Togo, Niger and Nigeria. Where bateleurs were once common in road surveys in Central-West Africa, none were detected in newer road surveys from the 2000s in the same areas. Claims of an increase in potential numbers of bateleur in Uganda are not verified.

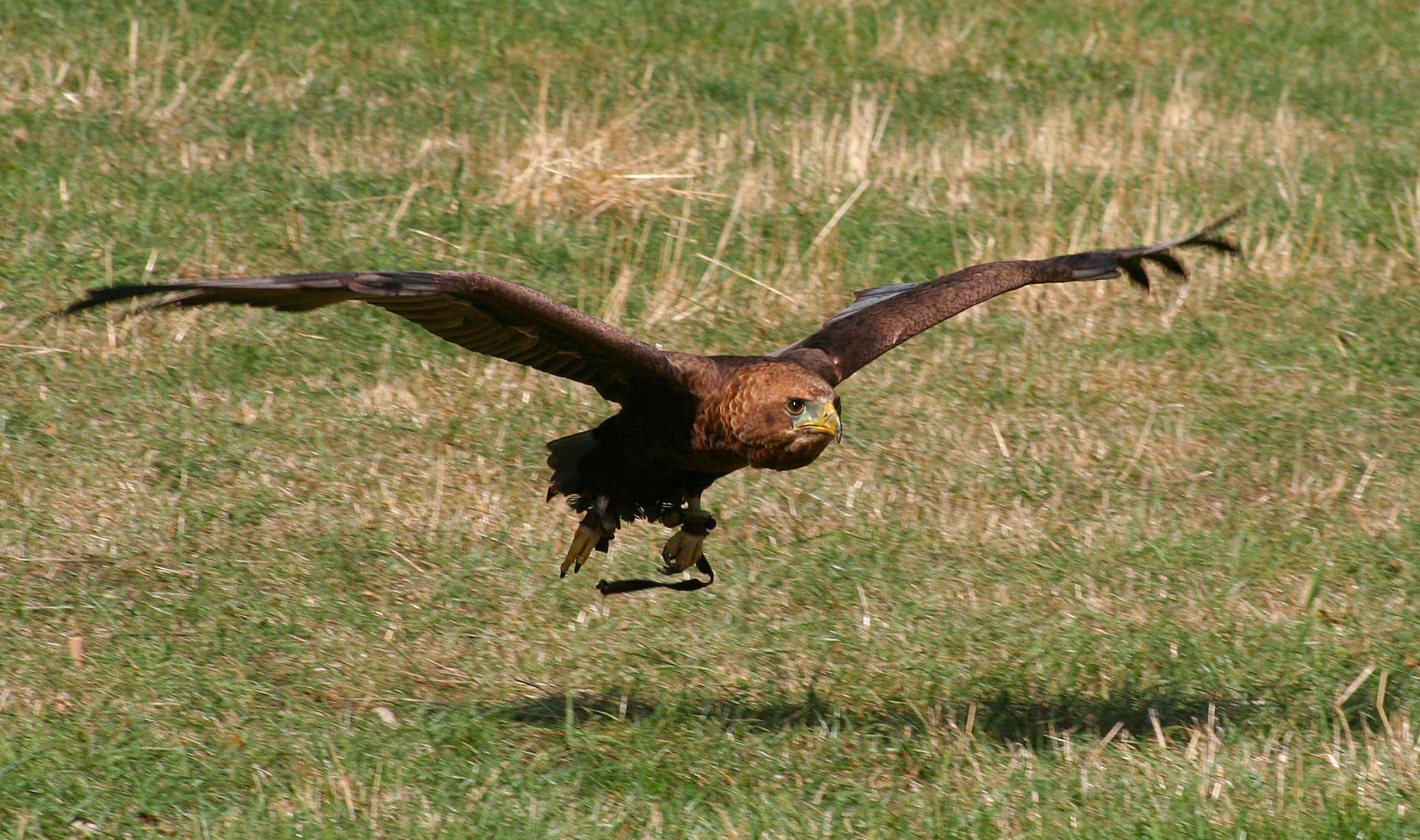
A captive immature bateleur

Decline of the species and the reduction in range is suspected to have been moderately rapid over the past three generations. Generally, throughout the range, the bateleur is considered much more common in protected areas. However even in several protected areas, numbers of bateleurs seem to be decreasing. The declines of the species are almost entirely due to anthropogenic causes. These include but are not limited to habitat destruction, the poisoning of carcasses, persecution through shooting and possibly pesticide use. Poisoning of carcasses is a major issue for scavenging animals, especially birds like vultures in Africa. Zambian bateleurs may suffer from deliberate poisonings as well as those in Eswatini, Botswana, Zimbabwe and Mozambique. The bateleur's wide foraging areas and their ability to locate very small pieces of carrion, makes them highly susceptible to poison-laced carcasses even from a small proportion of farmers who use poisons. Bateleurs and other eagles are not usually the direct target of these poisoning operations, which in some cases may be directed to unfavored mammals like jackals or in other cases directed towards vultures by poachers to hide their illegal wildlife killings. The decline of South African bateleurs is primarily linked with poisonings, primarily from large-scale farming operations. It is possible that bateleurs may suffer from the effects of DDT though it is found in a small sample of 3 eggs from South Africa that they evidenced low subcritical levels of DDT metabolites, probably not enough to effect overall populations. However, it is projected that pesticide use may be harming populations in Zambia as well as in Botswana. Ongoing persecution is both serious and unsustainable, beyond poisoning, such killings are known to extend to ongoing shooting and trapping. Some trapping occurs of the species for its feathers which are used in medicine by traditional healers for predicting future events Less well known but probably occurring declines may be due to flying into manmade objects including wire collisions, reservoir drownings and road-killings. Additionally, shrinking habitat has been found to be a prevalent threat to bateleurs due largely to expanding human settlements and intensifying livestock agriculture. A further effect from humans is regular disturbance at bateleur nests, although not typically as deliberate as many other threats, this is causing the breeding success rates to plummet farther. No large scale actions are underway but they are possibly protected in Yemen as an endangered species. It is proposed to implement education and awareness campaigns across its range to reduce the use of poisoned baits. Regular population monitoring is being carried out.

== Heraldic and mythological status ==
The bateleur plays a prominent role in African heraldic and mythological cultures probably due to its spectacular colours and conspicuous and bold behaviour. As a result it is likely that the bateleur is the basis for the "Zimbabwe Bird" which has been prominent since ancient times in Zimbabwean culture and continuously used in heraldic forms including most prominently being featured on the Zimbabwe flag. A South African myth was that when bateleurs "cries in flight, the rain will fall". The admiration and mythologizing of bateleurs is also known in other areas beyond Zimbabwe, including among those in Southern Africa who speak Tswana language as well as elsewhere dating back to the Iron Age with the bateleur variously known as kgwadira and petleke, and may often in mythology fulfill the role of intelligent servant to their masters, which were considered vultures. In East and Central Africa, the bateleur has been referred to variously as gawarakko and nkona and in the Lake Tanganyika region was considered an essential possession of sultans whether the birds were dead or alive.

== Media ==
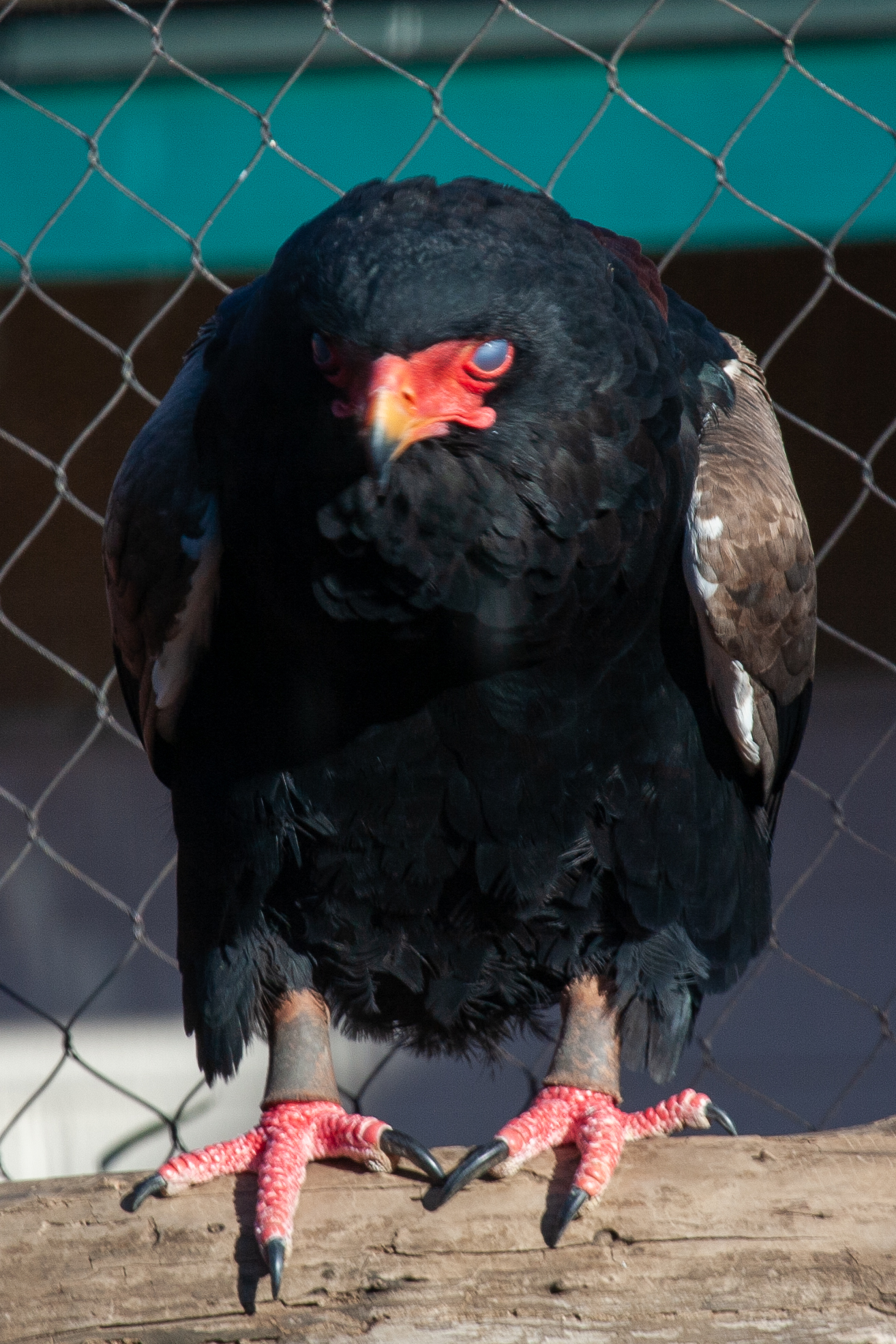
A bateleur blinking showing off the nictitating membrane

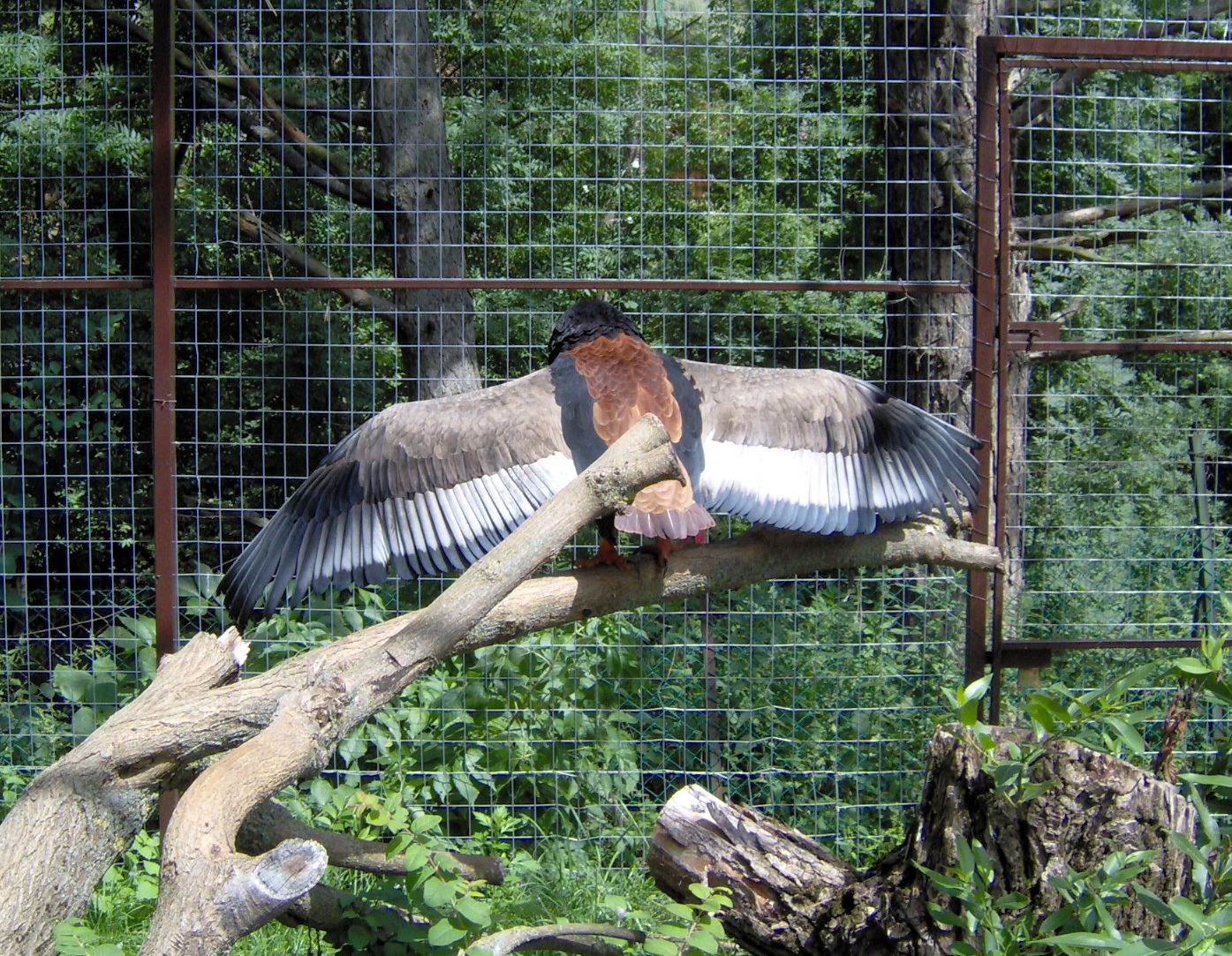
Female sunwarming in a zoo

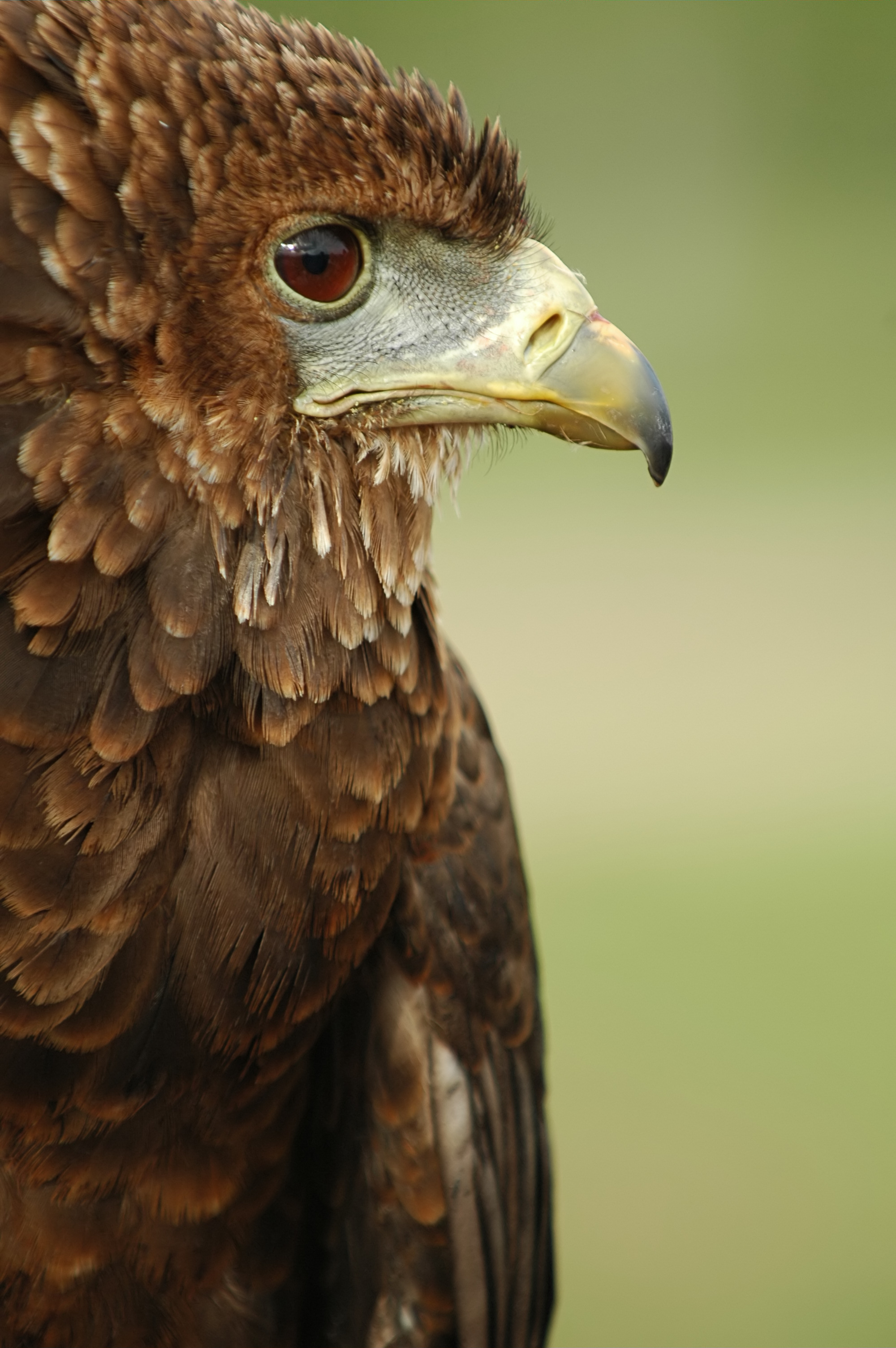
Immature

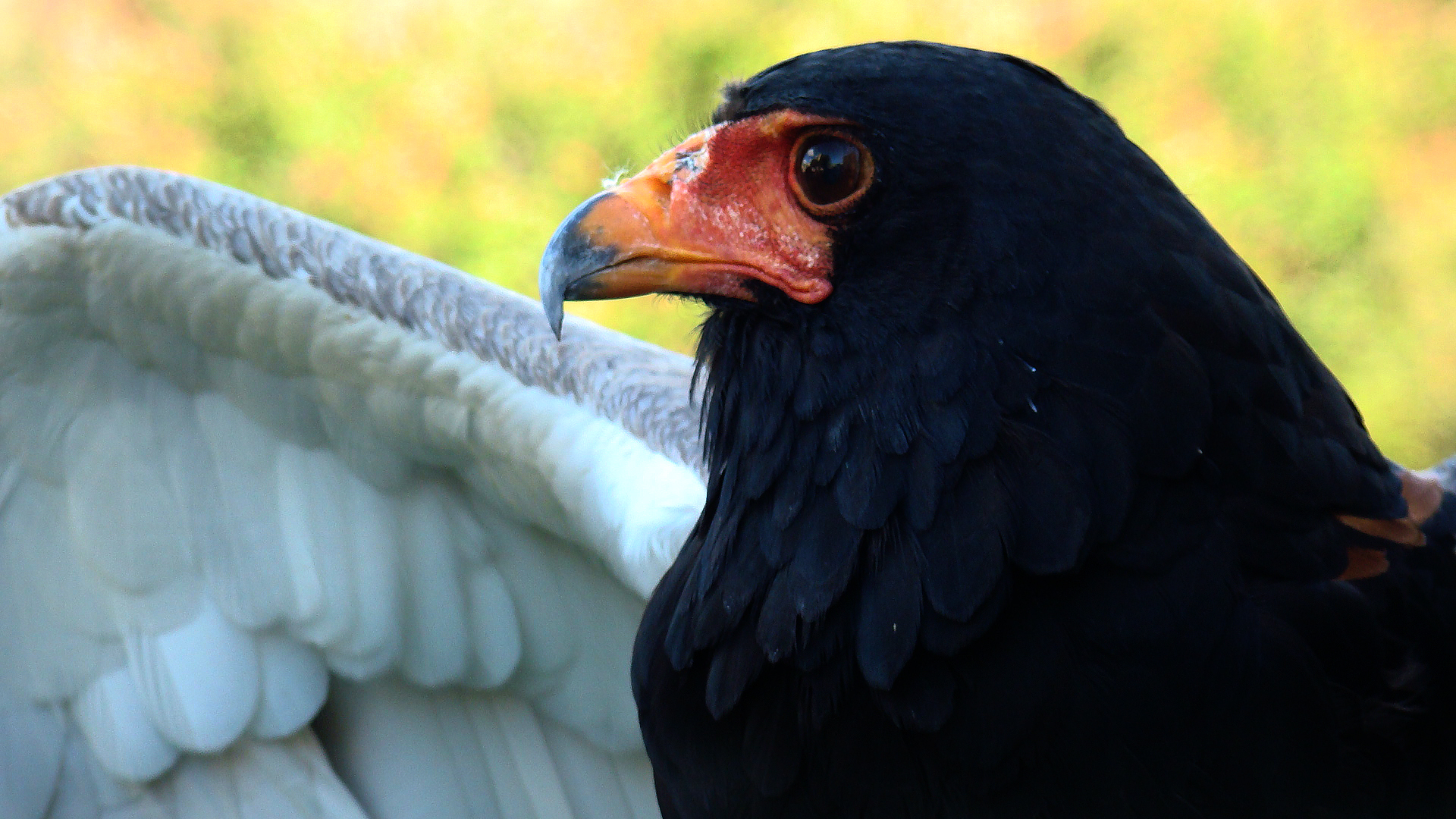
Female in Texas

A female perched on a gloved hand in Disney's Animal Kingdom

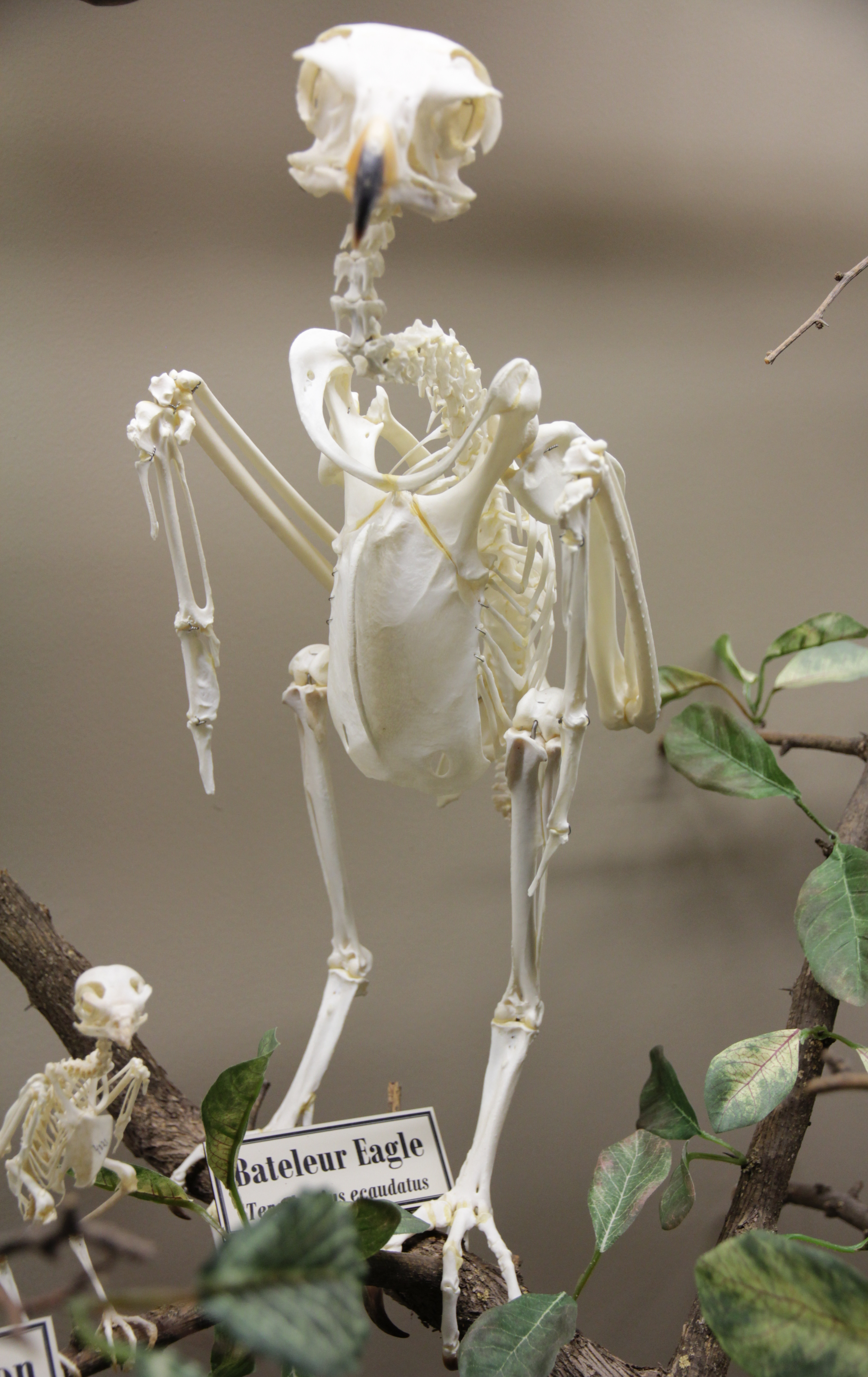
Skeleton of a bateleur eagle (Museum of Osteology)

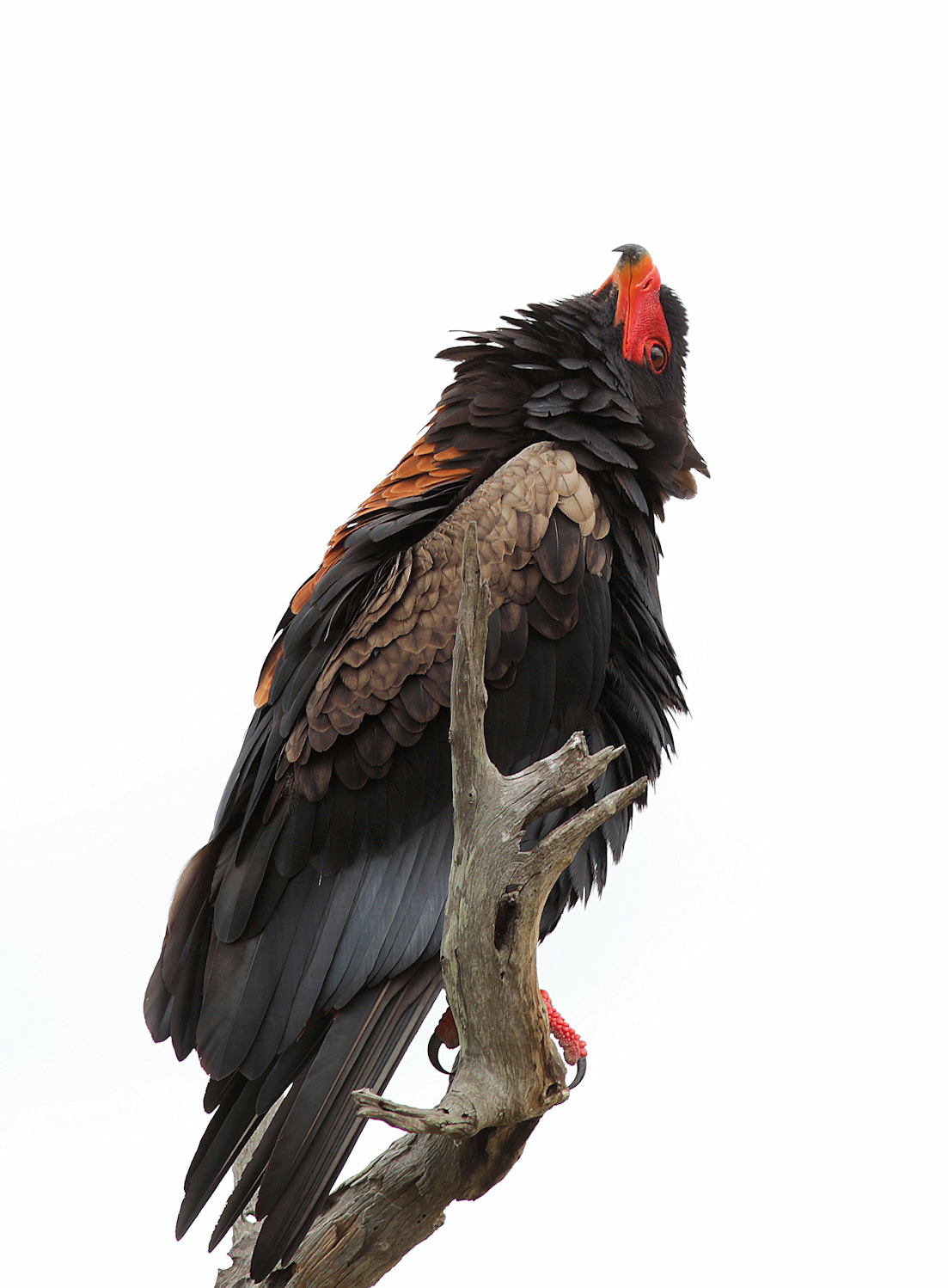
In South Africa
