= List of weaverbird species =

Weavers, widowbirds, and allies form the family Ploceidae. The International Ornithological Committee (IOC) recognizes these 122 species; 67 of them are in genus Ploceus and the rest are distributed among 14 other genera.

This list is presented according to the IOC taxonomic sequence and can also be sorted alphabetically by common name and binomial.

Common name	Binomial name + authority	IOC sequence
White-billed buffalo weaver	Bubalornis albirostris (Vieillot, 1817)	1
Red-billed buffalo weaver	Bubalornis niger Smith, A, 1836	2
White-headed buffalo weaver	Dinemellia dinemelli (Rüppell, 1845)	3
White-browed sparrow-weaver	Plocepasser mahali Smith, A, 1836	4
Chestnut-crowned sparrow-weaver	Plocepasser superciliosus (Cretzschmar, 1827)	5
Donaldson Smith's sparrow-weaver	Plocepasser donaldsoni Sharpe, 1895	6
Chestnut-backed sparrow-weaver	Plocepasser rufoscapulatus Büttikofer, 1888	7
Rufous-tailed weaver	Histurgops ruficauda Reichenow, 1887	8
Grey-capped social weaver	Pseudonigrita arnaudi (Bonaparte, 1850)	9
Black-capped social weaver	Pseudonigrita cabanisi (Fischer, GA & Reichenow, 1884)	10
Sociable weaver	Philetairus socius (Latham, 1790)	11
Scaly-feathered weaver	Sporopipes squamifrons (Smith, A, 1836)	12
Speckle-fronted weaver	Sporopipes frontalis (Daudin, 1800)	13
Thick-billed weaver	Amblyospiza albifrons (Vigors, 1831)	14
Baglafecht weaver	Ploceus baglafecht (Daudin, 1802)	15
Bannerman's weaver	Ploceus bannermani Chapin, 1932	16
Bates's weaver	Ploceus batesi (Sharpe, 1908)	17
Black-chinned weaver	Ploceus nigrimentus Reichenow, 1904	18
Bertram's weaver	Ploceus bertrandi (Shelley, 1893)	19
Slender-billed weaver	Ploceus pelzelni (Hartlaub, 1887)	20
Loango weaver	Ploceus subpersonatus (Cabanis, 1876)	21
Little weaver	Ploceus luteolus (Lichtenstein, MHC, 1823)	22
Spectacled weaver	Ploceus ocularis Smith, A, 1828	23
Olive-naped weaver	Ploceus brachypterus Swainson, 1837	24
Black-necked weaver	Ploceus nigricollis (Vieillot, 1805)	25
Strange weaver	Ploceus alienus (Sharpe, 1902)	26
Black-billed weaver	Ploceus melanogaster Shelley, 1887	27
Cape weaver	Ploceus capensis (Linnaeus, 1766)	28
Bocage's weaver	Ploceus temporalis (Barboza du Bocage, 1880)	29
Eastern golden weaver	Ploceus subaureus Smith, A, 1839	30
Holub's golden weaver	Ploceus xanthops (Hartlaub, 1862)	31
Orange weaver	Ploceus aurantius (Vieillot, 1805)	32
Heuglin's masked weaver	Ploceus heuglini Reichenow, 1886	33
Golden palm weaver	Ploceus bojeri (Cabanis, 1869)	34
Taveta weaver	Ploceus castaneiceps (Sharpe, 1890)	35
Principe weaver	Ploceus princeps (Bonaparte, 1850)	36
Northern brown-throated weaver	Ploceus castanops Shelley, 1888	37
Southern brown-throated weaver	Ploceus xanthopterus (Hartlaub & Finsch, 1870)	38
Ruvu weaver	Ploceus holoxanthus Hartlaub, 1891	39
Kilombero weaver	Ploceus burnieri Baker, NE & Baker, EM, 1990	40
Rüppell's weaver	Ploceus galbula Rüppell, 1840	41
Northern masked weaver	Ploceus taeniopterus (Reichenbach, 1863)	42
Lesser masked weaver	Ploceus intermedius Rüppell, 1845	43
Southern masked weaver	Ploceus velatus Vieillot, 1819	44
Katanga masked weaver	Ploceus katangae (Verheyen, 1947)	45
Lufira masked weaver	Ploceus ruweti Louette & Benson, 1982	46
Tanzanian masked weaver	Ploceus reichardi Reichenow, 1886	47
Vitelline masked weaver	Ploceus vitellinus (Lichtenstein, MHC, 1823)	48
Speke's weaver	Ploceus spekei (Heuglin, 1861)	49
Fox's weaver	Ploceus spekeoides Grant, CHB & Mackworth-Praed, 1947	50
Village weaver	Ploceus cucullatus (Müller, PLS, 1776)	51
Giant weaver	Ploceus grandis (Gray, GR, 1844)	52
Chestnut-and-black weaver	Ploceus castaneofuscus Lesson, RP, 1840	53
Vieillot's black weaver	Ploceus nigerrimus Vieillot, 1819	54
Weyns's weaver	Ploceus weynsi (Dubois, AJC, 1900)	55
Kilifi weaver	Ploceus golandi (Clarke, S, 1913)	56
Juba weaver	Ploceus dichrocephalus (Salvadori, 1896)	57
Black-headed weaver	Ploceus melanocephalus (Linnaeus, 1758)	58
Golden-backed weaver	Ploceus jacksoni Shelley, 1888	59
Cinnamon weaver	Ploceus badius (Cassin, 1850)	60
Chestnut weaver	Ploceus rubiginosus Rüppell, 1840	61
Golden-naped weaver	Ploceus aureonucha Sassi, 1920	62
Yellow-mantled weaver	Ploceus tricolor (Hartlaub, 1854)	63
Maxwell's black weaver	Ploceus albinucha (Barboza du Bocage, 1876)	64
Nelicourvi weaver	Ploceus nelicourvi (Scopoli, 1786)	65
Sakalava weaver	Ploceus sakalava Hartlaub, 1861	66
Asian golden weaver	Ploceus hypoxanthus (Sparrman, 1788)	67
Compact weaver	Ploceus superciliosus (Shelley, 1873)	68
Black-breasted weaver	Ploceus benghalensis (Linnaeus, 1758)	69
Streaked weaver	Ploceus manyar (Horsfield, 1821)	70
Baya weaver	Ploceus philippinus (Linnaeus, 1766)	71
Finn's weaver	Ploceus megarhynchus Hume, 1869	72
Dark-backed weaver	Ploceus bicolor Vieillot, 1819	73
Preuss's weaver	Ploceus preussi (Reichenow, 1893)	74
Yellow-capped weaver	Ploceus dorsomaculatus (Reichenow, 1893)	75
Olive-headed weaver	Ploceus olivaceiceps (Reichenow, 1899)	76
Usambara weaver	Ploceus nicolli Sclater, WL, 1931	77
Brown-capped weaver	Ploceus insignis (Sharpe, 1891)	78
Bar-winged weaver	Ploceus angolensis (Barboza du Bocage, 1878)	79
Sao Tome weaver	Ploceus sanctithomae (Hartlaub, 1848)	80
Yellow-legged weaver	Ploceus flavipes (Chapin, 1916)	81
Red-crowned malimbe	Malimbus coronatus Sharpe, 1906	82
Cassin's malimbe	Malimbus cassini (Elliot, DG, 1859)	83
Rachel's malimbe	Malimbus racheliae (Cassin, 1857)	84
Gola malimbe	Malimbus ballmanni Wolters, 1974	85
Red-vented malimbe	Malimbus scutatus (Cassin, 1849)	86
Ibadan malimbe	Malimbus ibadanensis Elgood, 1958	87
Blue-billed malimbe	Malimbus nitens (Gray, JE, 1831)	88
Red-headed malimbe	Malimbus rubricollis (Swainson, 1838)	89
Red-bellied malimbe	Malimbus erythrogaster Reichenow, 1893	90
Crested malimbe	Malimbus malimbicus (Daudin, 1802)	91
Red-headed weaver	Anaplectes rubriceps (Sundevall, 1850)	92
Red weaver	Anaplectes jubaensis Van Someren, 1920	93
Cardinal quelea	Quelea cardinalis (Hartlaub, 1880)	94
Red-headed quelea	Quelea erythrops (Hartlaub, 1848)	95
Red-billed quelea	Quelea quelea (Linnaeus, 1758)	96
Red fody	Foudia madagascariensis (Linnaeus, 1766)	97
Comoros fody	Foudia eminentissima Bonaparte, 1850	98
Aldabra fody	Foudia aldabrana Ridgway, 1893	99
Forest fody	Foudia omissa Rothschild, 1912	100
Mauritius fody	Foudia rubra (Gmelin, JF, 1789)	101
Seychelles fody	Foudia sechellarum Newton, E, 1867	102
Rodrigues fody	Foudia flavicans Newton, A, 1865	103
Bob-tailed weaver	Brachycope anomala (Reichenow, 1887)	104
Yellow-crowned bishop	Euplectes afer (Gmelin, JF, 1789)	105
Fire-fronted bishop	Euplectes diadematus Fischer, GA & Reichenow, 1878	106
Black bishop	Euplectes gierowii Cabanis, 1880	107
Zanzibar red bishop	Euplectes nigroventris Cassin, 1848	108
Black-winged red bishop	Euplectes hordeaceus (Linnaeus, 1758)	109
Southern red bishop	Euplectes orix (Linnaeus, 1758)	110
Northern red bishop	Euplectes franciscanus (Isert, 1789)	111
Golden-backed bishop	Euplectes aureus (Gmelin, JF, 1789)	112
Yellow bishop	Euplectes capensis (Linnaeus, 1766)	113
Fan-tailed widowbird	Euplectes axillaris (Smith, A, 1838)	114
Yellow-mantled widowbird	Euplectes macroura (Gmelin, JF, 1789)	115
Marsh widowbird	Euplectes hartlaubi (Barboza du Bocage, 1878)	116
Montane widowbird	Euplectes psammacromius (Reichenow, 1900)	117
White-winged widowbird	Euplectes albonotatus (Cassin, 1848)	118
Red-collared widowbird	Euplectes ardens (Boddaert, 1783)	119
Red-cowled widowbird	Euplectes laticauda (Lichtenstein, MHC, 1823)	120
Long-tailed widowbird	Euplectes progne (Boddaert, 1783)	121
Jackson's widowbird	Euplectes jacksoni (Sharpe, 1891)	122
