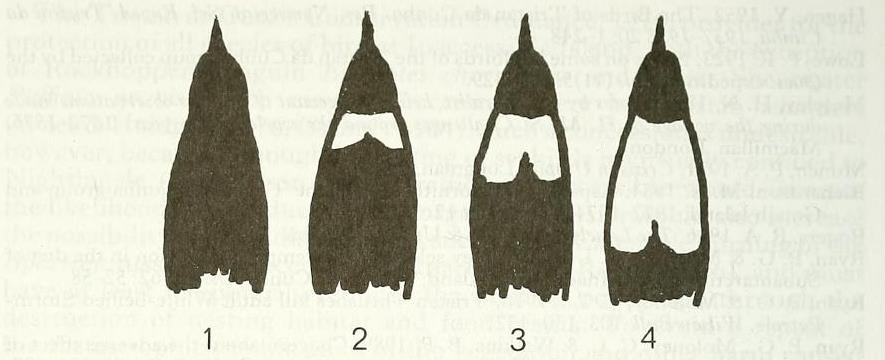
- 4. ventral plumage of male

Conservation status
- Endangered (IUCN 3.1)

Scientific classification
- Kingdom: Animalia
- Phylum: Chordata
- Class: Aves
- Order: Passeriformes
- Family: Ploceidae
- Genus: Malimbus
- Species: M. ibadanensis

Binomial name
- Malimbus ibadanensis Elgood, 1958

= Ibadan malimbe =

Species of bird

The Ibadan malimbe (Malimbus ibadanensis) is a rare species of bird in the family Ploceidae.

It is endemic to Nigeria, where it is known only from the southwestern part of the country, including the city of Ibadan (in Oyo) which it is named after. It was first discovered in 1951 and was common at one point. Forest clearing made it rare.

The bird is about 20 centimeters long. The male is black with a red head and breast. The female has smaller red areas.

The bird forages in pairs or small groups, sometimes alongside the red-headed malimbe (Malimbus rubricollis). It lives in forest and woodland habitat, including degraded areas.
