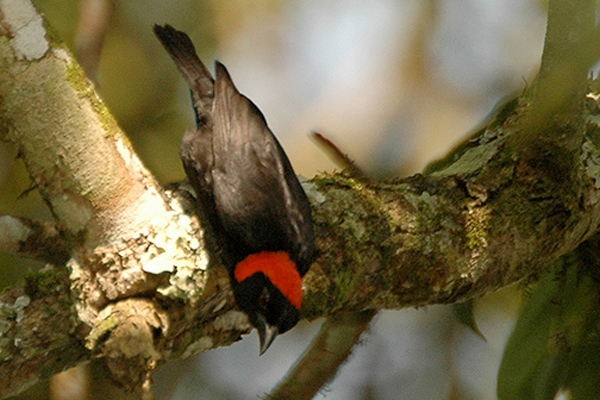
- Red-headed malimbe (Malimbus rubricollis)

Scientific classification
- Kingdom: Animalia
- Phylum: Chordata
- Class: Aves
- Order: Passeriformes
- Family: Ploceidae
- Genus: Malimbus; Vieillot, 1805

Type species
- Malimbus cristatus Vieillot, 1805=Tanagra malimbica Daudin, 1802

= Malimbus =

Genus of birds

Malimbus is a genus of birds in the family Ploceidae that are found in sub-Saharan Africa.

== Taxonomy ==
The genus Malimbus was introduced in 1805 by the French ornithologist Louis Vieillot to accommodate a single species, Malibus cristatus Vieillot. This is the type species. It is a junior synonym of Tanagra malimbica, the crested malimbe, that had been described by the French zoologist François Marie Daudin in 1802.

The genus contains the following ten species:

| Image | Scientific name | Common name | Distribution |
|---|---|---|---|
| | Malimbus coronatus | Red-crowned malimbe | Central Africa |
| | Malimbus cassini | Cassin's malimbe | Central Africa |
| | Malimbus racheliae | Rachel's malimbe | western Central Africa |
| | Malimbus ballmanni | Gola malimbe | Gola Forest in Sierra Leone and in western Liberia, eastern Liberia to western Ivory Coast and Diecke Forest Reserve in Guinea |
| | Malimbus scutatus | Red-vented malimbe | West Africa |
| | Malimbus ibadanensis | Ibadan malimbe | Nigeria |
| | Malimbus nitens | Blue-billed malimbe | African tropical rainforest |
| | Malimbus rubricollis | Red-headed malimbe | African tropical rainforest |
| | Malimbus erythrogaster | Red-bellied malimbe | Central Africa |
| | Malimbus malimbicus | Crested malimbe | African tropical rainforest |
