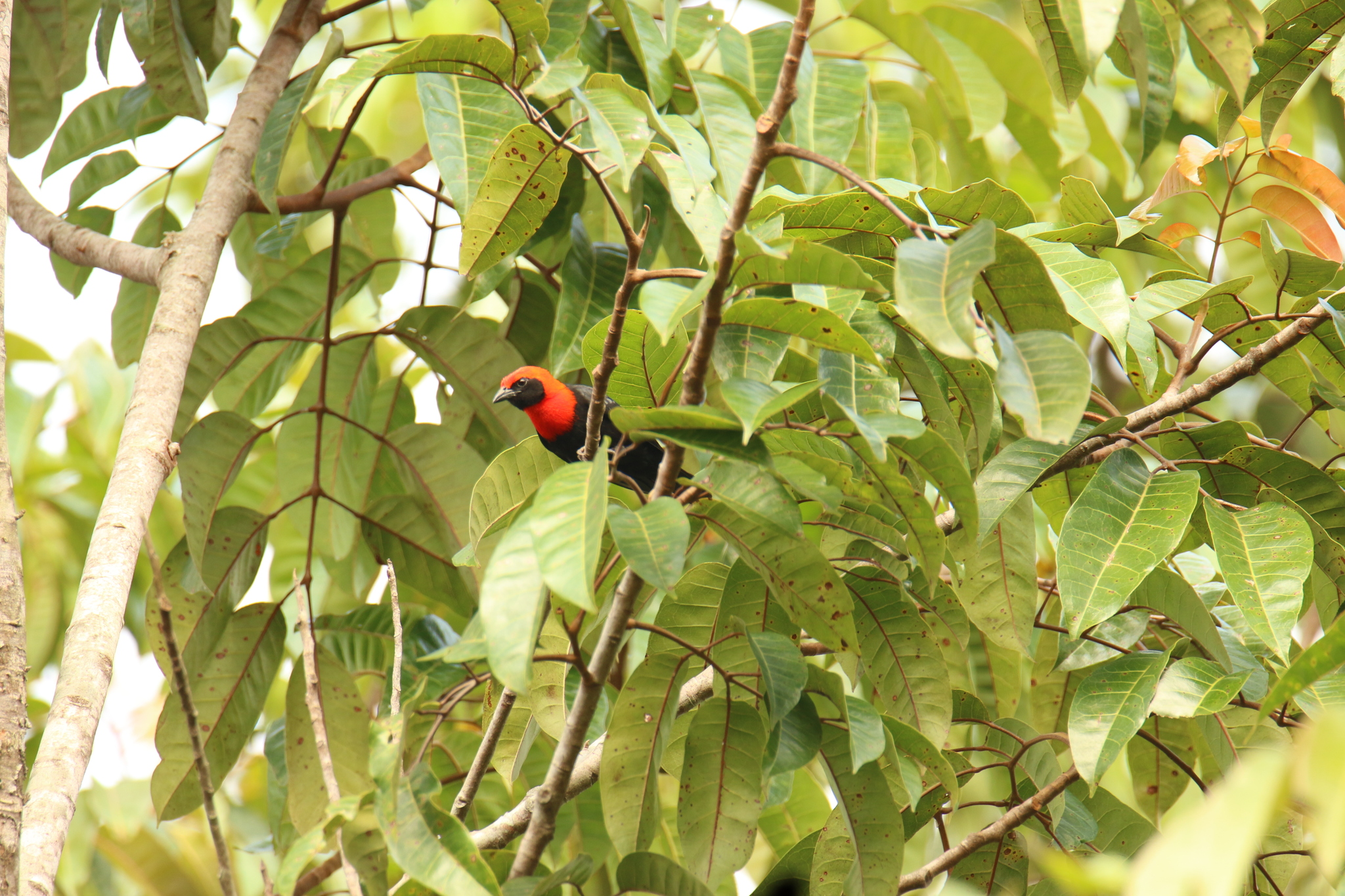

Conservation status
- Least Concern (IUCN 3.1)

Scientific classification
- Kingdom: Animalia
- Phylum: Chordata
- Class: Aves
- Order: Passeriformes
- Family: Ploceidae
- Genus: Malimbus
- Species: M. cassini

Binomial name
- Malimbus cassini (Elliot, 1859)

= Cassin's malimbe =

Species of bird

Cassin's malimbe (Malimbus cassini) is a species of bird in the family Ploceidae. It is found in Cameroon, Central African Republic, Republic of the Congo, Democratic Republic of the Congo, Equatorial Guinea, Gabon, and Ghana.
