= John Hamel Elgood =

British ornithologist

John Hamel Elgood (1909–1998) was a British ornithologist.

He was the founder of Nigerian Ornithologists' Society.

Taxon authored: Malimbus ibadanensis.
