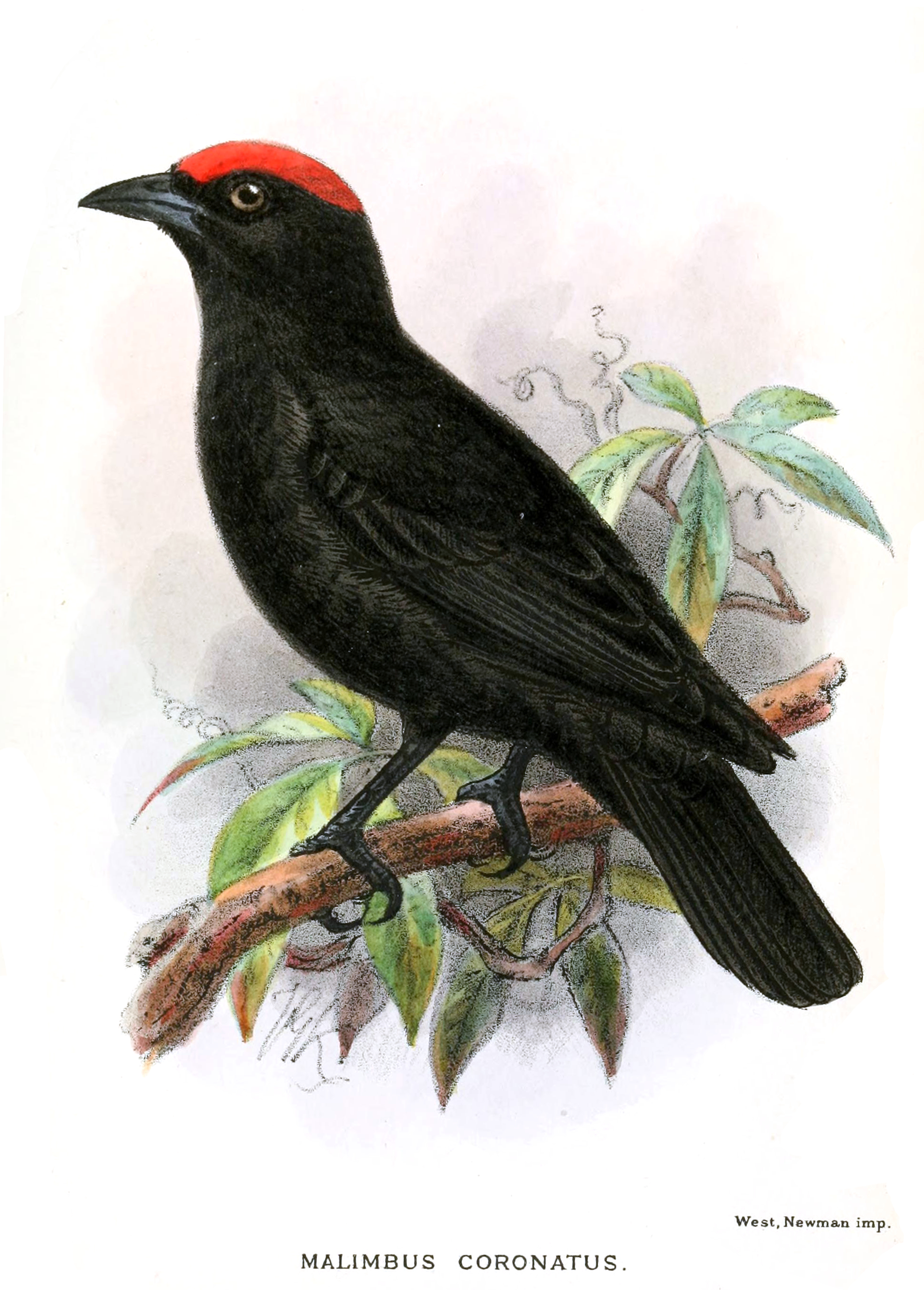
- A male red-crowned malimbe

Conservation status
- Least Concern (IUCN 3.1)

Scientific classification
- Kingdom: Animalia
- Phylum: Chordata
- Class: Aves
- Order: Passeriformes
- Family: Ploceidae
- Genus: Malimbus
- Species: M. coronatus

Binomial name
- Malimbus coronatus Sharpe, 1906

= Red-crowned malimbe =

Species of bird

The red-crowned malimbe (Malimbus coronatus) is a species of bird in the family Ploceidae (members of which are called weavers). It is found in across central Africa, in Cameroon, Central African Republic, Republic of the Congo, Democratic Republic of the Congo, Equatorial Guinea, and Gabon. It is and mostly found in the forest canopy. Due to its large range, it is classified as least concern, though the population is thought to be declining.

Adult females of the species are all-black, while males have red on the crown.
