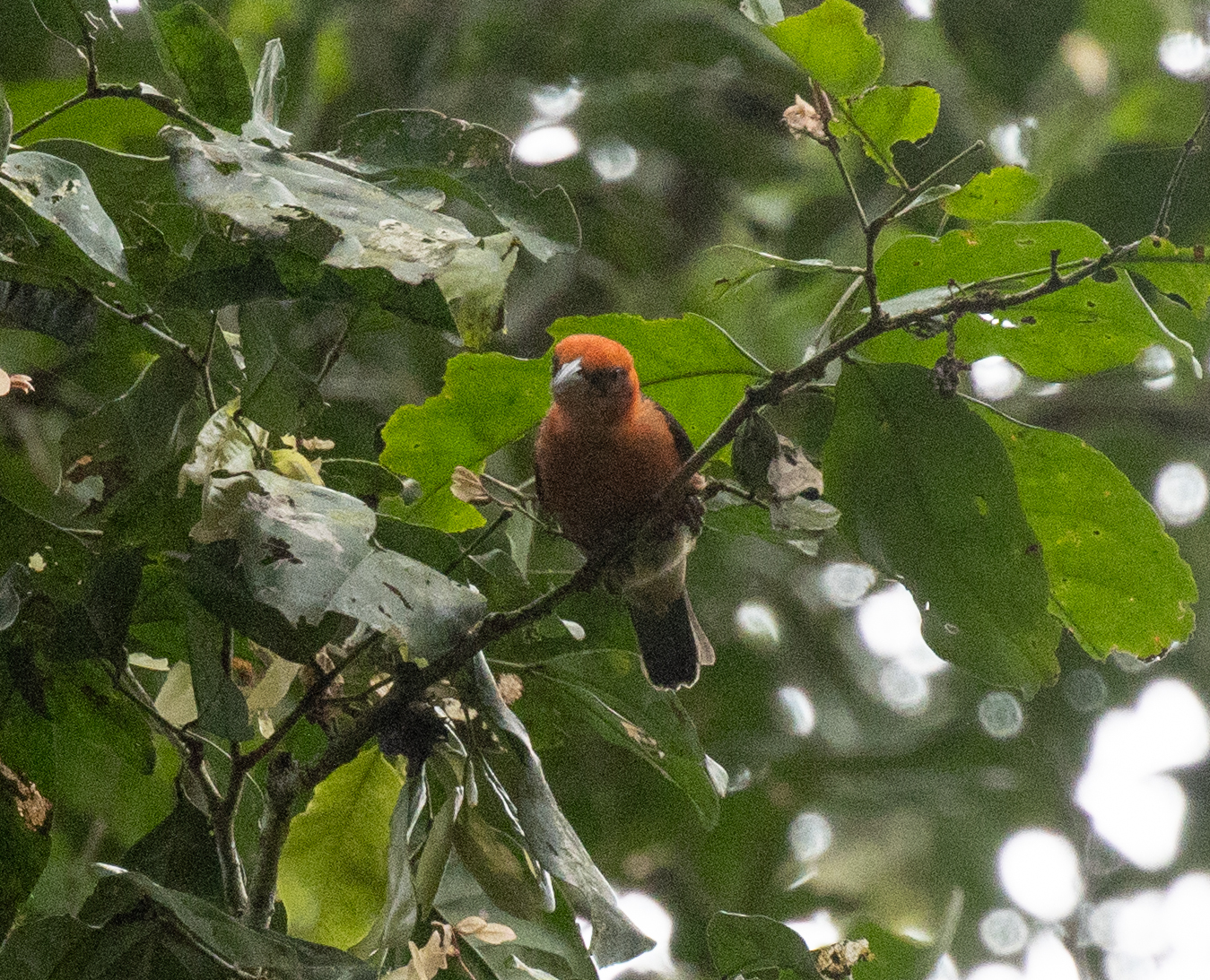

Conservation status
- Least Concern (IUCN 3.1)

Scientific classification
- Kingdom: Animalia
- Phylum: Chordata
- Class: Aves
- Order: Passeriformes
- Family: Ploceidae
- Genus: Malimbus
- Species: M. erythrogaster

Binomial name
- Malimbus erythrogaster Reichenow, 1893

= Red-bellied malimbe =

Species of bird

The red-bellied malimbe (Malimbus erythrogaster) is a species of bird in the family Ploceidae. It is found in Cameroon, Central African Republic, Republic of the Congo, Democratic Republic of the Congo, Equatorial Guinea, Gabon, Nigeria, South Sudan, and Uganda.
