= Gola malimbe =

Conservation status
- Near Threatened (IUCN 3.1)

Scientific classification
- Kingdom: Animalia
- Phylum: Chordata
- Class: Aves
- Order: Passeriformes
- Family: Ploceidae
- Genus: Malimbus
- Species: M. ballmanni

Binomial name
- Malimbus ballmanni Wolters, 1974

Species of bird

The Gola malimbe or Ballmann's malimbe (Malimbus ballmanni) is a species of bird in the family Ploceidae.

== Description ==
The Gola malimbe is a black forest weaver, the males have an orange-yellow nape, bright golden-yellow crescent on the breast and golden yellow patch on the vent. The female is almost completely black with an indistinct yellowish crescent on the breast. Juveniles are similar to the adults but duller and the yellow on the breast extends to the throat.. Length is 17 cm.

=== Voice ===
The males song includes a series of unmusical, chattering sounds followed by a wheezing phrase and lasts roughly three seconds "cheg chig cheg cheg chega zzzzzzzzzzzzzzzz", and is similar to that of the village weaver. The females' song is similar but lacks the wheezing part at the end "cheg cheg chig chag chaaag cheg chiiig".

== Distribution and habitat ==
The Gola malimbe is found in west Africa where there are three known populations, the first in the Gola Forest in Sierra Leone and in western Liberia, the second from eastern Liberia to western Ivory Coast and the third in Diecke Forest Reserve in Guinea.

Its natural habitat is lowland primary rainforest, lightly logged forest and old secondary growth.

== Habits ==
The Gola malimbe is usually found singly or in small groups in the canopy of the lower storey, between 8 and 22m from the ground, where it forages for insects. It will join mixed species flocks. There appear to be two breeding seasons, a minor breeding season in the short, intermediate dry season in July and August and a main breeding season in October and November

== Conservation ==
The Gola malimbe is threatened by habitat loss, especially deforestation. Although it occurs in a number of protected areas these have been subject to illegal logging, especially in the lawlessness caused by civil conflicts within its range. Its conservation status is assessed as endangered.

== Etymology ==
The common name and scientific name commemorate the German geoscientist Peter Ballmann who also collected birds, including one of the first specimens of this species.
