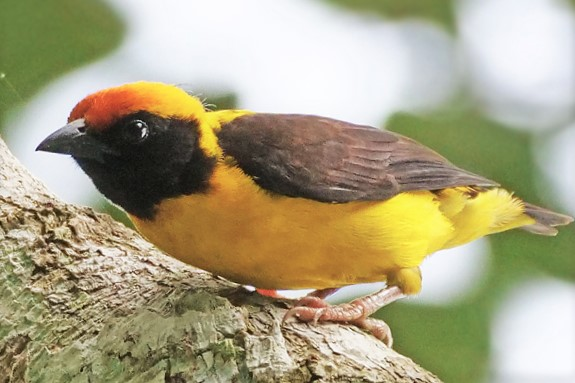

Conservation status
- Least Concern (IUCN 3.1)

Scientific classification
- Kingdom: Animalia
- Phylum: Chordata
- Class: Aves
- Order: Passeriformes
- Family: Ploceidae
- Genus: Ploceus
- Species: P. preussi

Binomial name
- Ploceus preussi (Reichenow, 1893)

= Preuss's weaver =

Species of bird

Preuss's weaver (Ploceus preussi) is a species of bird in the family Ploceidae, which is native to the African tropics.

== Range ==
It is found in Cameroon, Central African Republic, Republic of the Congo, DRC, Ivory Coast, Equatorial Guinea, Gabon, Ghana, Guinea, Liberia, and Sierra Leone.
