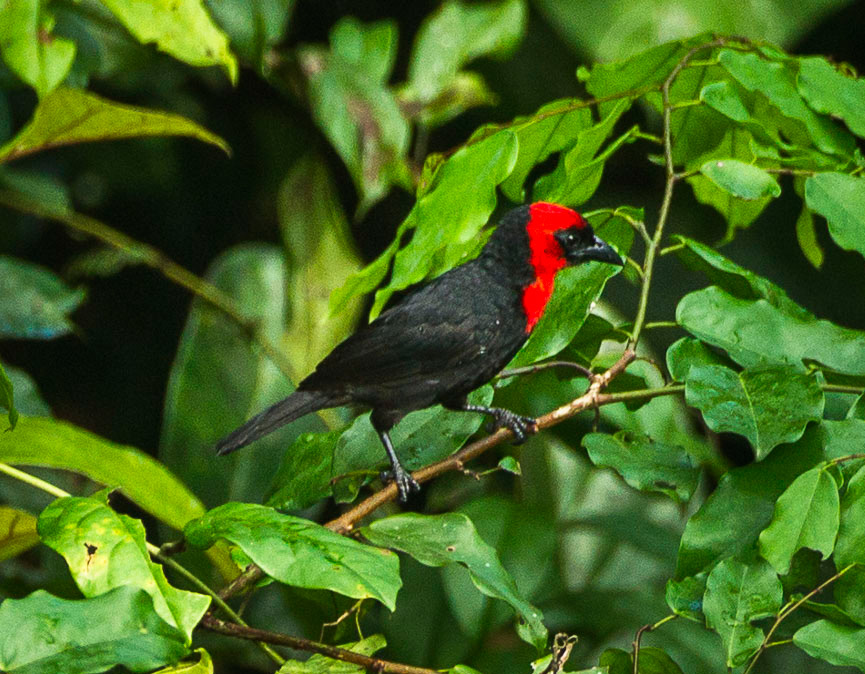

Conservation status
- Least Concern (IUCN 3.1)

Scientific classification
- Kingdom: Animalia
- Phylum: Chordata
- Class: Aves
- Order: Passeriformes
- Family: Ploceidae
- Genus: Malimbus
- Species: M. malimbicus

Binomial name
- Malimbus malimbicus (Daudin, 1802)

= Crested malimbe =

Species of bird

The crested malimbe (Malimbus malimbicus) is a species of bird in the family Ploceidae. It is native to the African tropical rainforest.
