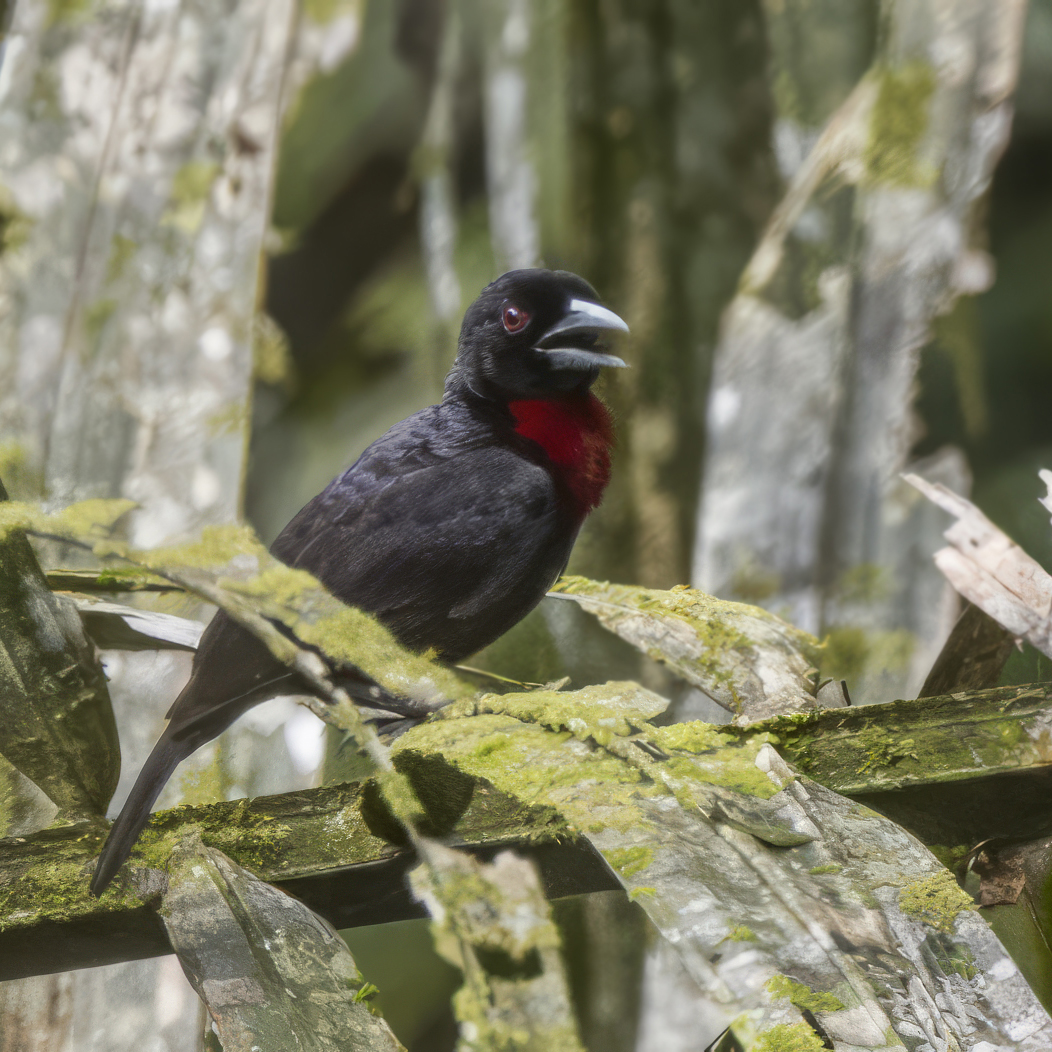

Conservation status
- Least Concern (IUCN 3.1)

Scientific classification
- Kingdom: Animalia
- Phylum: Chordata
- Class: Aves
- Order: Passeriformes
- Family: Ploceidae
- Genus: Malimbus
- Species: M. nitens

Binomial name
- Malimbus nitens (Gray, JE, 1831)

= Blue-billed malimbe =

Species of bird

The blue-billed malimbe or Gray's malimbe (Malimbus nitens) is a species of bird in the family Ploceidae.

It is native to the African tropical rainforest.
