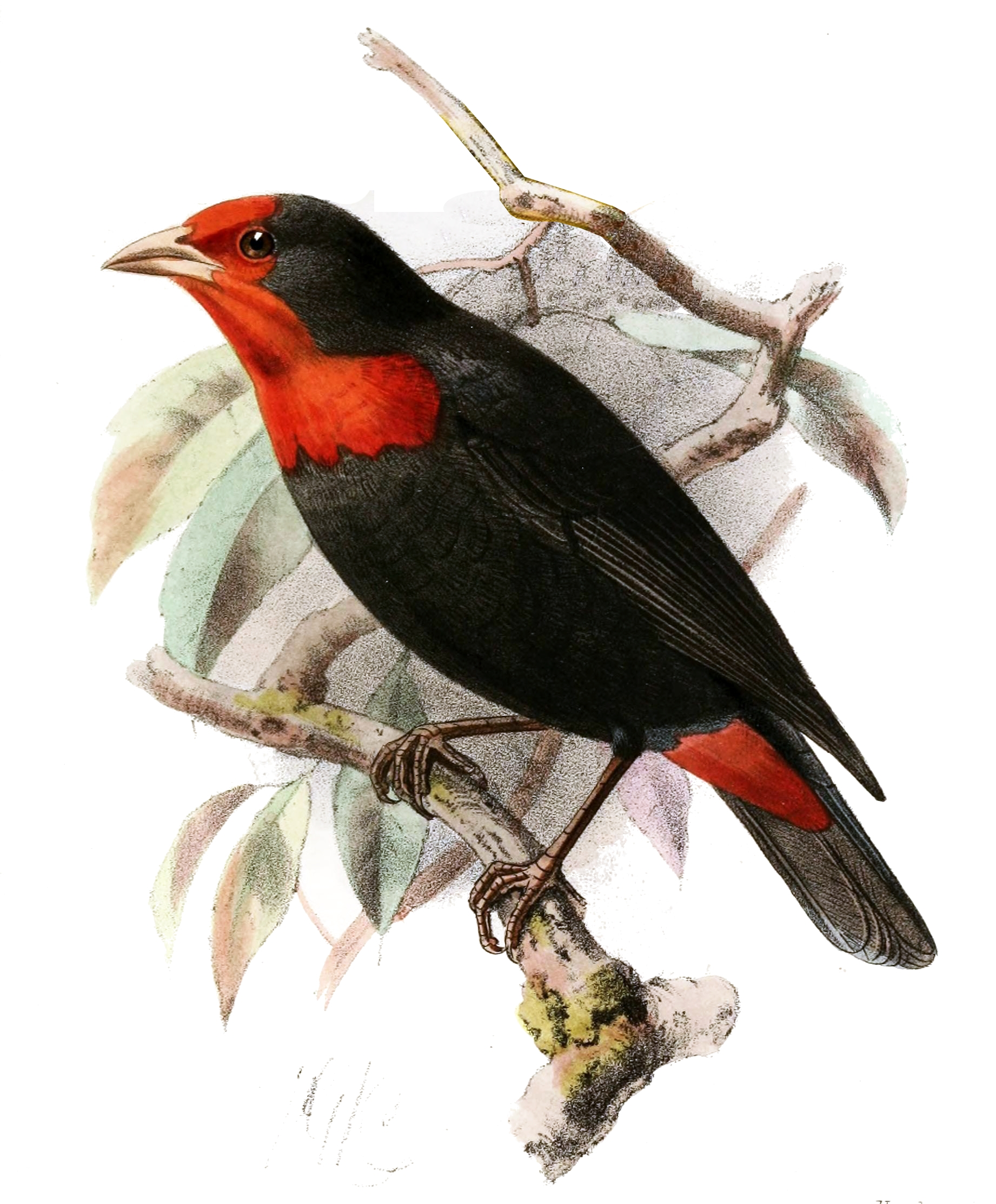
- Illustration of M. s. rubropersonatus
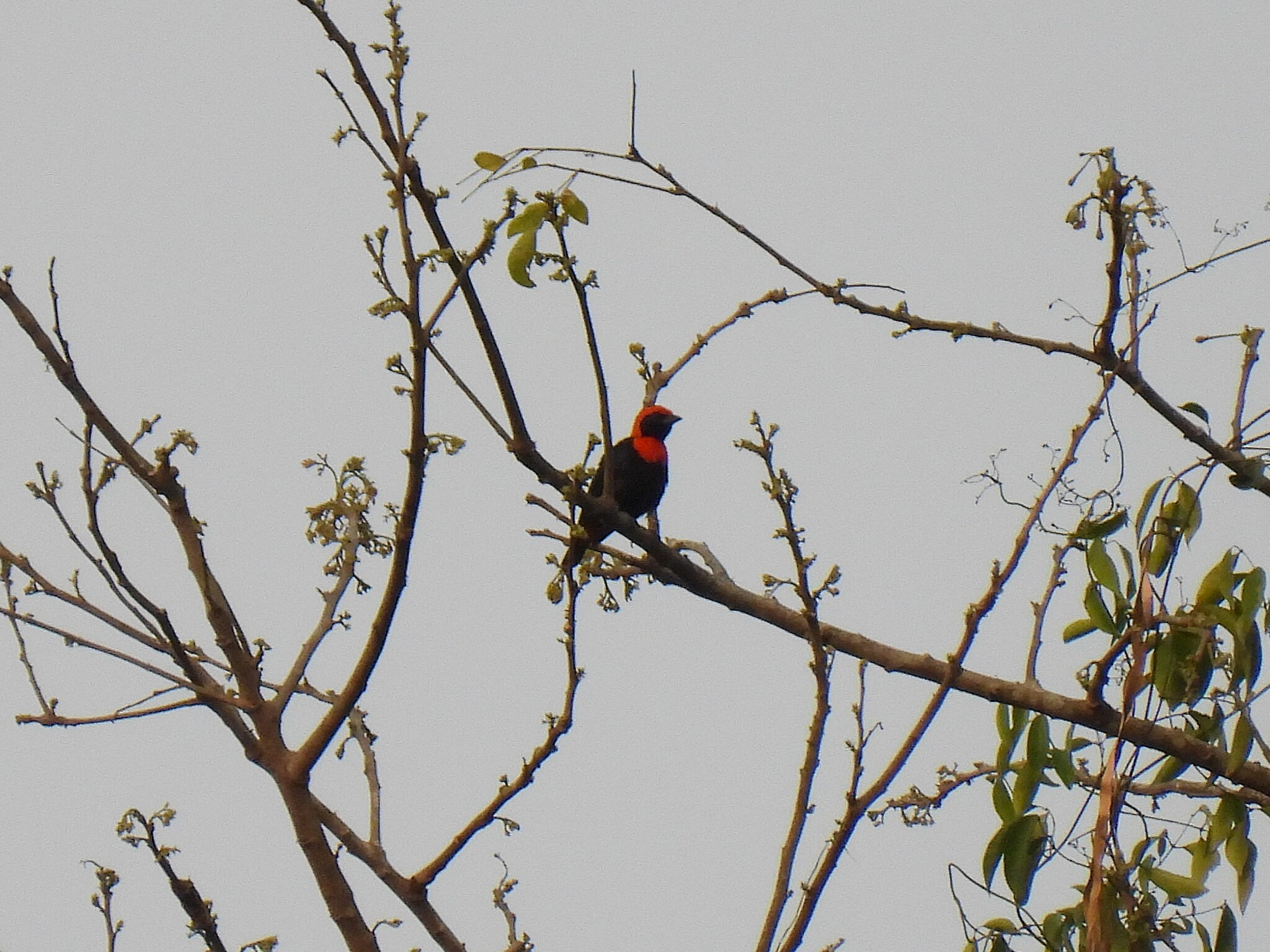

Conservation status
- Least Concern (IUCN 3.1)

Scientific classification
- Kingdom: Animalia
- Phylum: Chordata
- Class: Aves
- Order: Passeriformes
- Family: Ploceidae
- Genus: Malimbus
- Species: M. scutatus

Binomial name
- Malimbus scutatus (Cassin, 1849)

= Red-vented malimbe =

Species of bird

The red-vented malimbe (Malimbus scutatus) is a species of bird in the family Ploceidae. It is found in Benin, Cameroon, Ivory Coast, Ghana, Guinea, Liberia, Nigeria, Sierra Leone, and Togo. Its natural habitat is subtropical or tropical swamps.
