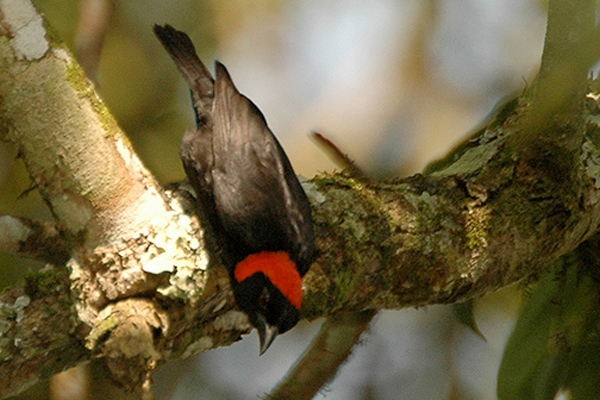

Conservation status
- Least Concern (IUCN 3.1)

Scientific classification
- Kingdom: Animalia
- Phylum: Chordata
- Class: Aves
- Order: Passeriformes
- Family: Ploceidae
- Genus: Malimbus
- Species: M. rubricollis

Binomial name
- Malimbus rubricollis (Swainson, 1838)

= Red-headed malimbe =

Species of bird

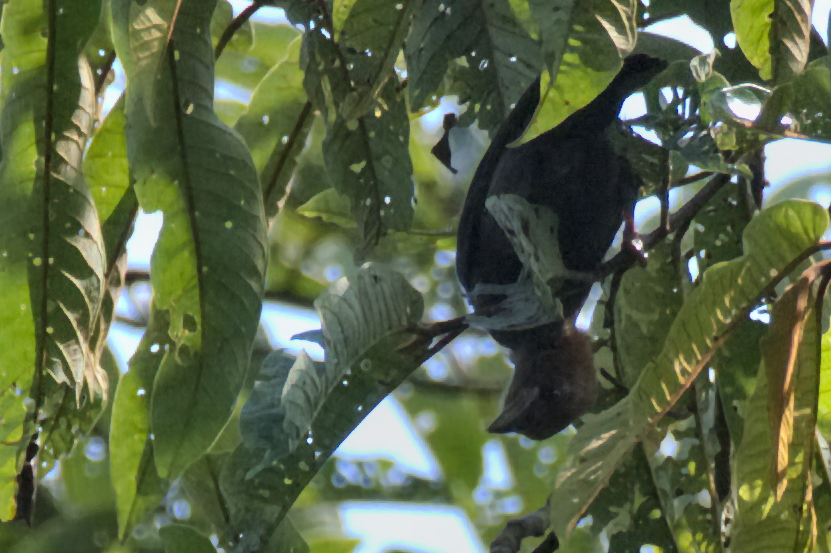
Red-headed Malimbe, juvenile

The red-headed malimbe (Malimbus rubricollis) is a species of bird in the family Ploceidae. It is native to the African tropical rainforest.
