= Cercococcyx =

Scientific classification
- Kingdom: Animalia
- Phylum: Chordata
- Class: Aves
- Order: Cuculiformes
- Family: Cuculidae
- Genus: Cercococcyx; Cabanis, 1882

Type species
- Cercococcyx mechowi Cabanis, 1882

Genus of birds

Cercococcyx is a genus of cuckoos in the family Cuculidae, known as the long-tailed cuckoos.

== Species ==
Cercococcyx contains the following species:

- Whistling long-tailed cuckoo (Cercococcyx lemaireae)
- Barred long-tailed cuckoo (Cercococcyx montanus)
- Dusky long-tailed cuckoo (Cercococcyx mechowi)
- Olive long-tailed cuckoo (Cercococcyx olivinus)

Many sources do not recognize Cercococcyx lemaireae as distinct from Cercococcyx mechowi.
