= Whistling long-tailed cuckoo =

Conservation status
- Near Threatened (IUCN 3.1)

Scientific classification
- Kingdom: Animalia
- Phylum: Chordata
- Class: Aves
- Order: Cuculiformes
- Family: Cuculidae
- Genus: Cercococcyx
- Species: C. lemaireae

Binomial name
- Cercococcyx lemaireae Boesman & Collar, 2019

Species of cuckoo native to Western Africa

The whistling long-tailed cuckoo (Cercococcyx lemaireae) is a species of cuckoo in the family Cuculidae. It is distributed in West Africa and western Central Africa, from west of the Bakossi Mountains in Cameroon west to Sierra Leone.

It was formerly thought to be a disjunct western population of the dusky long-tailed cuckoo (C. mechowi), which it is morphologically indistinguishable from, but it was later split from C. mechowi on account of its different vocalizations. The whistling long-tailed cuckoo has two distinct songs: one described by Nigel James Collar and Peter Boesman as a song of "three rising notes" (phoneticized as "hu hee wheeu") and a Halcyon kingfisher-esque song described by Collar and Boesman as "plaintive whinnying" (phoneticized as "tiutiutiutiutittiui-tiu-tiu-tiu"). On the other hand, the dusky long-tailed cuckoo has two different songs: a song described by Collar and Boesman as "three similar, less melodious notes" (phoneticized as "wheet-wheet-wheet") and a fast, descending song (phoneticized as "wheewheewheewheewhee"). These song differences led to the description of C. lemaireae as a distinct species.
