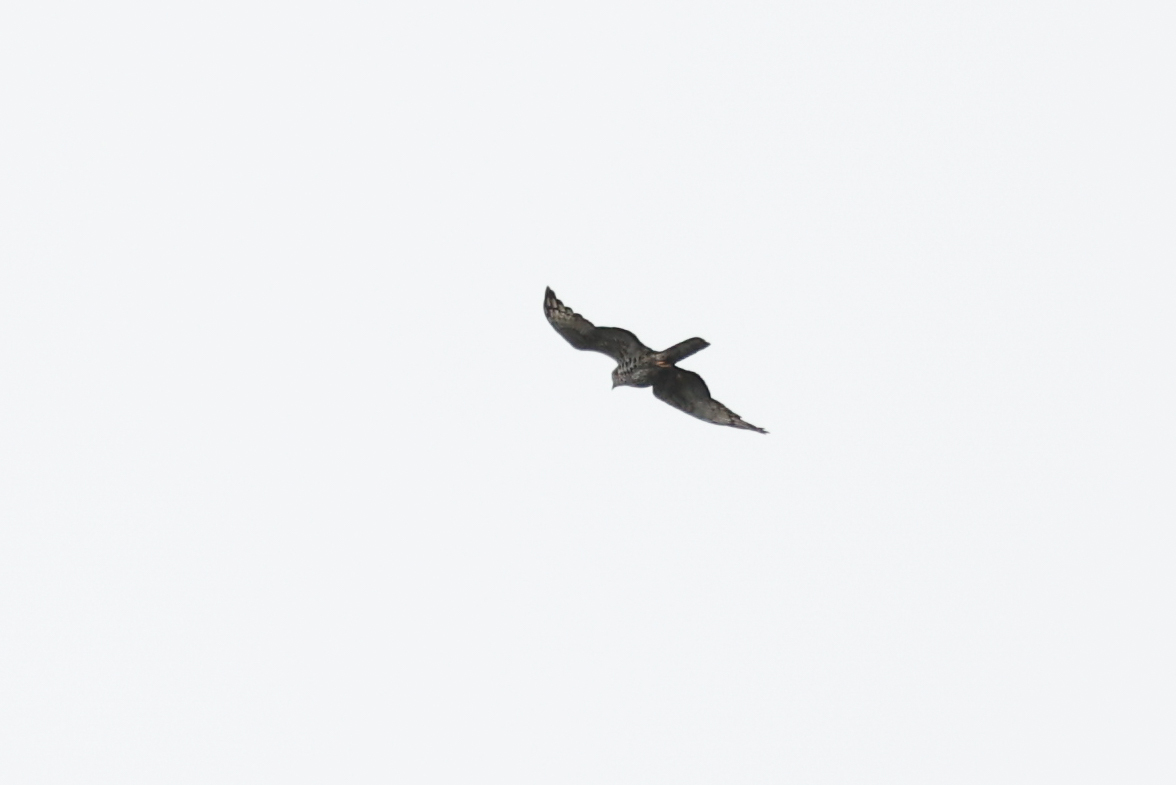

Conservation status
- Least Concern (IUCN 3.1)

Scientific classification
- Kingdom: Animalia
- Phylum: Chordata
- Class: Aves
- Order: Cuculiformes
- Family: Cuculidae
- Genus: Cercococcyx
- Species: C. montanus

Binomial name
- Cercococcyx montanus Chapin, 1928

= Barred long-tailed cuckoo =

Species of bird

The barred long-tailed cuckoo (Cercococcyx montanus) is a species of cuckoo in the family Cuculidae. It is found in the Albertine Rift montane forests and disjunctly throughout East Africa.
