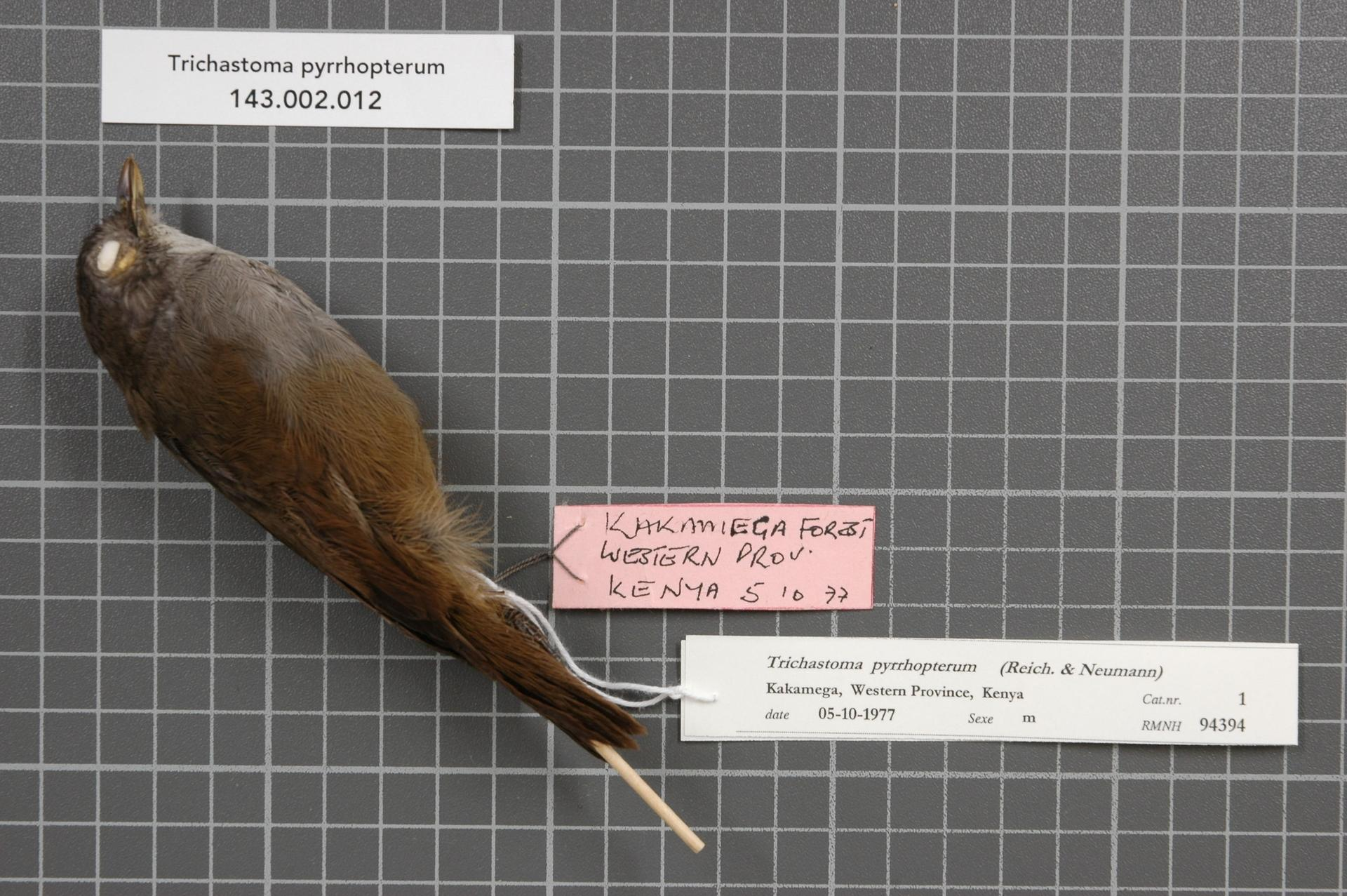

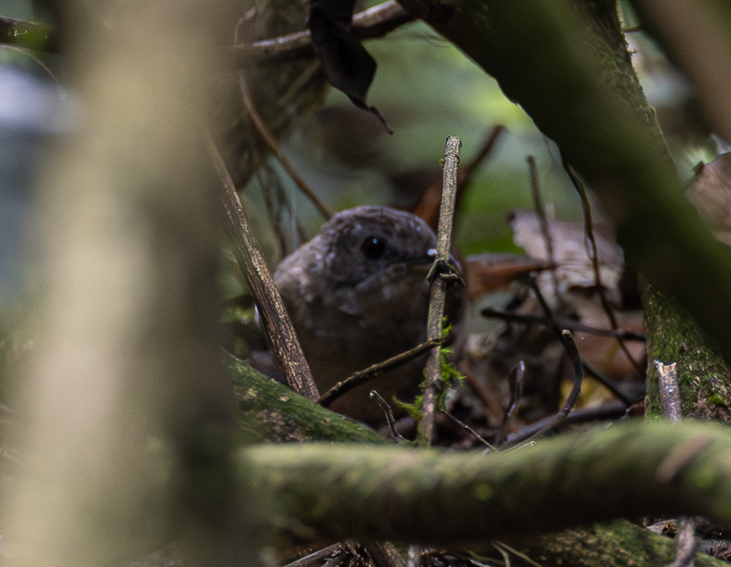

Conservation status
- Least Concern (IUCN 3.1)

Scientific classification
- Kingdom: Animalia
- Phylum: Chordata
- Class: Aves
- Order: Passeriformes
- Family: Pellorneidae
- Genus: Illadopsis
- Species: I. pyrrhoptera

Binomial name
- Illadopsis pyrrhoptera (Reichenow & Neumann, 1895)

= Mountain illadopsis =

Species of bird

The mountain illadopsis (Illadopsis pyrrhoptera) is a species of bird in the family Pellorneidae. It is found in the Albertine Rift montane forests, Kenya, northern Malawi and western Tanzania. Its natural habitats are subtropical or tropical dry forest and subtropical or tropical moist montane forest.
