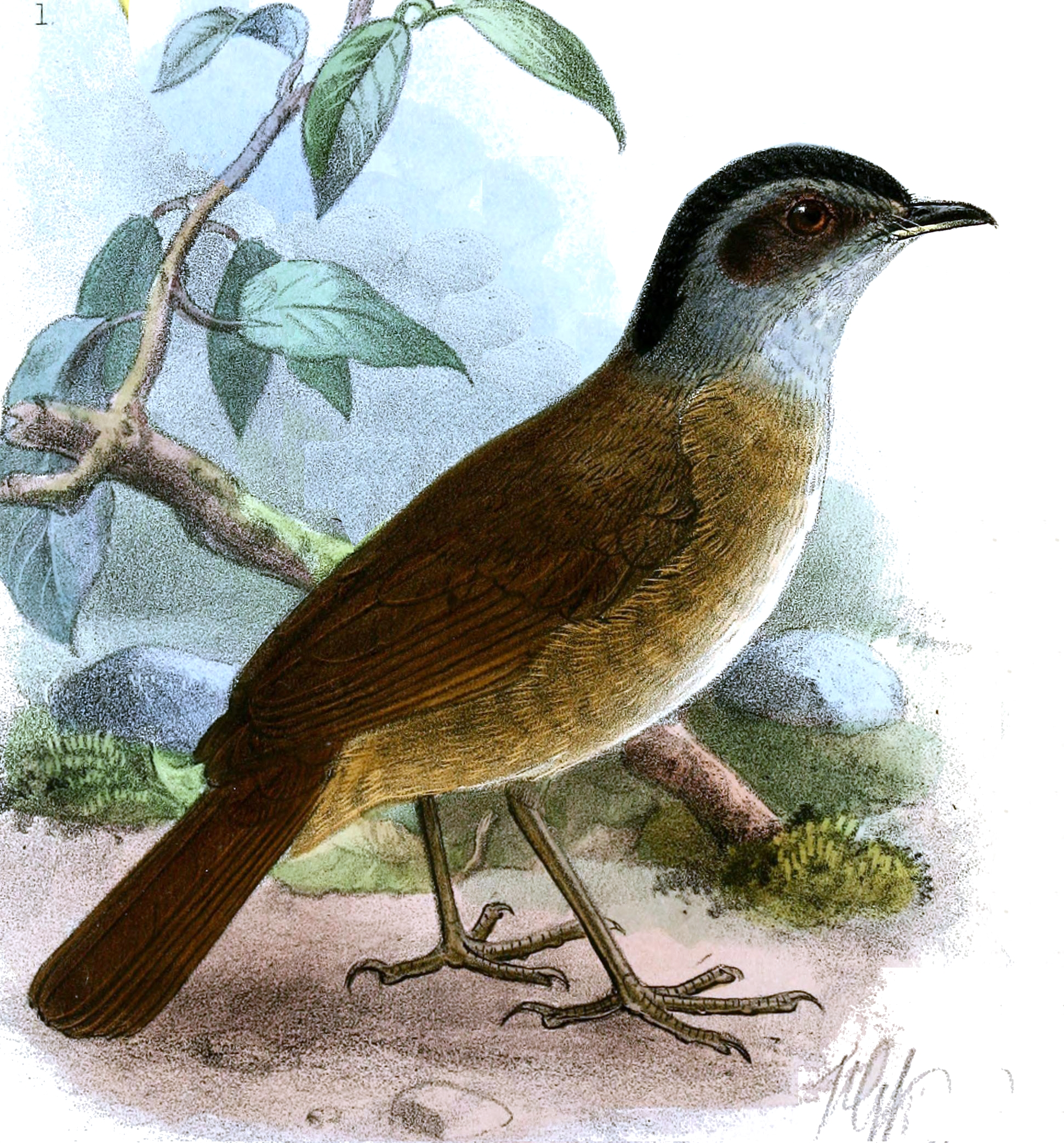

Scientific classification
- Kingdom: Animalia
- Phylum: Chordata
- Class: Aves
- Order: Passeriformes
- Family: Pellorneidae
- Genus: Illadopsis; Heine, 1860

Type species
- Turdirostris fulvescens Cassin, 1859

= Illadopsis =

Genus of birds

Illadopsis (from illas, Greek for thrush and opsis, appearing). All are found in tropical Africa, where they frequent the lower strata of forests, and reveal themselves mostly by their whistled call notes.

== Taxonomy ==
The genus Illadopsis was introduced in 1860 by the German ornithologist Ferdinand Heine to accommodate a single species, Turdirostris fulvescens Cassin, 1859, the brown illadopsis. This is the type species by monotypy. The genus name combines the Ancient Greek ιλλας/illas, ιλλαδος/illados meaning "thrush" with οψις/opsis meaning "appearance".

The genus contains the following nine species:

Image	Common name	Scientific name	Distribution
	Brown illadopsis	Illadopsis fulvescens	West and central Africa
	Pale-breasted illadopsis	Illadopsis rufipennis	West and central Africa
	Tanzanian illadopsis	Illadopsis distans	Southern Kenya to northeastern Tanzania, eastern Tanzania (Pugu Hills), and Zanzibar
	Mountain illadopsis	Illadopsis pyrrhoptera	Central east Africa
	Blackcap illadopsis	Illadopsis cleaveri	West and central west Africa
	Scaly-breasted illadopsis	Illadopsis albipectus	Northern Democratic Republic of the Congo, southeastern Central African Republic, southern South Sudan, Uganda, western Kenya, and northwestern Tanzania; northwestern Angola
	Spotted thrush-babbler	Illadopsis turdina	Central Africa
	Puvel's illadopsis	Illadopsis puveli	West and central Africa
	Rufous-winged illadopsis	Illadopsis rufescens	Senegal to Ghana; single record from Togo
