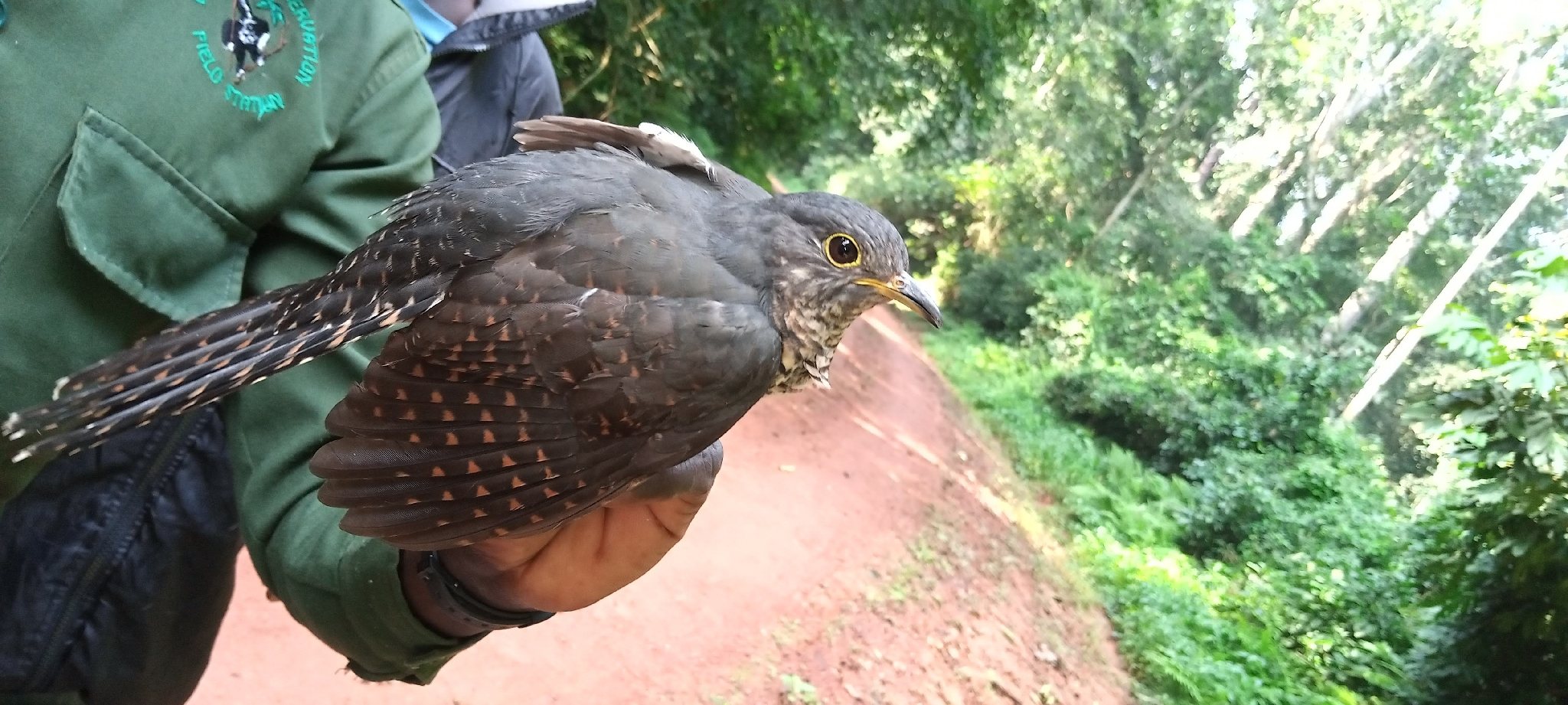

Conservation status
- Least Concern (IUCN 3.1)

Scientific classification
- Kingdom: Animalia
- Phylum: Chordata
- Class: Aves
- Order: Cuculiformes
- Family: Cuculidae
- Genus: Cercococcyx
- Species: C. mechowi

Binomial name
- Cercococcyx mechowi Cabanis, 1882

= Dusky long-tailed cuckoo =

Species of bird

The dusky long-tailed cuckoo (Cercococcyx mechowi) is a species of cuckoo in the family Cuculidae. It is found in forests in Central Africa. The IUCN has assessed it as a least-concern species.

== Taxonomy ==
The species was described by Jean Cabanis in 1882. It is monotypic. The specific epithet mechowi honours Friedrich Wilhelm Alexander von Mechow, a Prussian explorer. The name occidentalis for a population with different songs is a nomen nudum.

== Description ==
The dusky long-tailed cuckoo is about 33 cm (13 in) long and weighs 50–61 g (1.8–2.2 oz). The head, nape and upperparts are dark brown, washed sooty-grey and with a purple-blue iridescence. The wings are dark brown, with buff and white spots. The underparts are white, with blackish-brown bars, and the vent is buff. The tail is long and graduated. The eyes are dark brown, the beak is greenish-black and the feet are yellow. The male and female are alike. The juvenile bird has a blackish throat and rufous bars on its upperparts. The nestling's skin is black, and it has a yellow rump and pale feet.

== Distribution and habitat ==
This cuckoo has a discontinuous distribution and is found in Angola, most of Cameroon, the Central African Republic, Republic of the Congo, Democratic Republic of the Congo, Equatorial Guinea, Gabon, Tanzania, and Uganda. Populations west of the Bakossi Mountains, in northwestern Cameroon, Ghana, Guinea, Ivory Coast, Liberia, Nigeria, Sierra Leone, and Togo, are now considered a distinct species, the whistling long-tailed cuckoo (C. lemaireae) due to their differing calls. Its habitat is forests, preferring ones with dense undergrowth and lianas. It also occurs in tall secondary forests and forests along rivers.

== Behaviour ==
The dusky long-tailed cuckoo is often found in the undergrowth or mid-canopy. It eats caterpillars, ants, beetles, spiders, snails and seeds and joins mixed-species foraging flocks. Pairs often call from treetops. Its calls include hu hee wheeu and a series of notes that accelerates and then slows and descends. This cuckoo is a brood parasite. The blue-headed crested flycatcher, brown illadopsis and possibly the forest robin have been observed as hosts. Its breeding may be associated with the wet season.

== Status ==
The species does not appear to have substantial threats, and its population appears stable. The IUCN has assessed it as a least-concern species.
