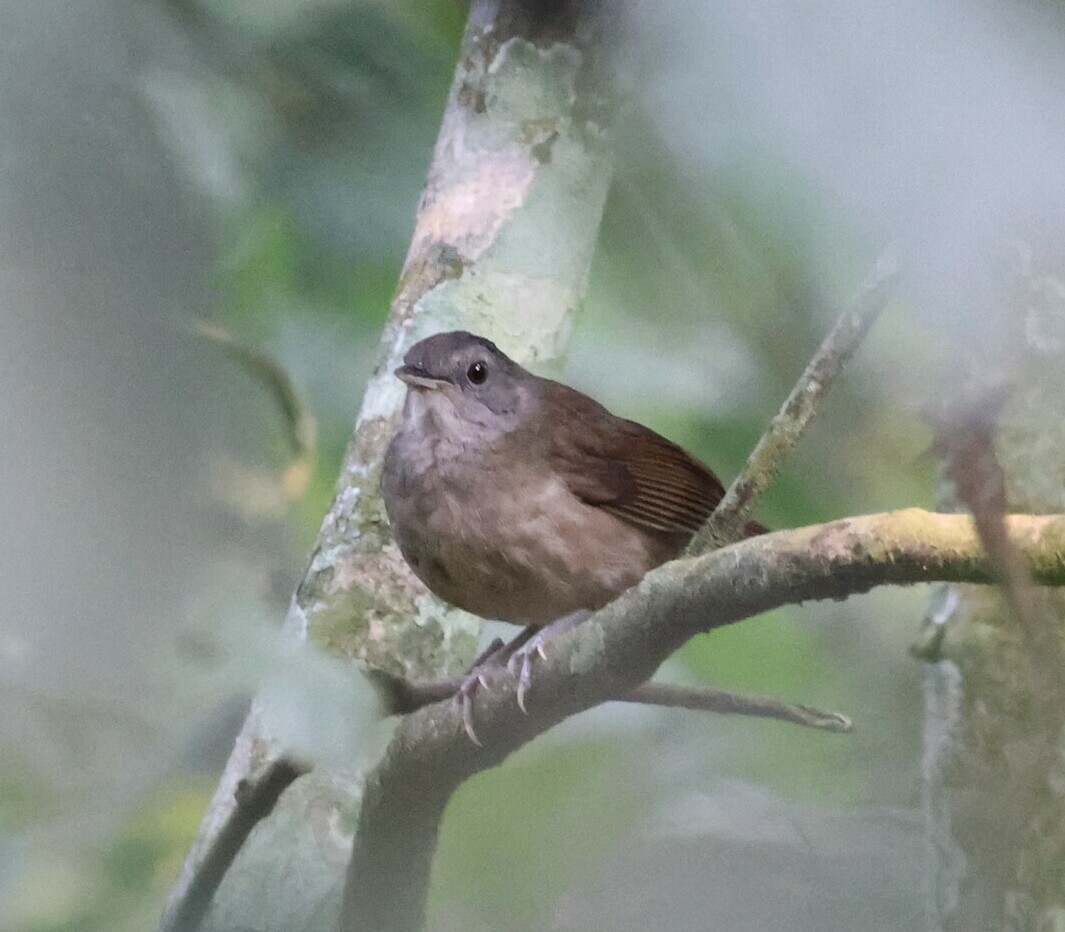

Conservation status
- Least Concern (IUCN 3.1)

Scientific classification
- Kingdom: Animalia
- Phylum: Chordata
- Class: Aves
- Order: Passeriformes
- Family: Pellorneidae
- Genus: Illadopsis
- Species: I. albipectus

Binomial name
- Illadopsis albipectus (Reichenow, 1888)

Audio
- Song recorded in Kaimosi Forest, Kenya

= Scaly-breasted illadopsis =

Species of bird

The scaly-breasted illadopsis (Illadopsis albipectus) is a species of bird in the family Pellorneidae. It is widespread throughout the Congo Basin, with a few isolated pockets in northern Angola, Uganda and South Sudan. Its natural habitat is subtropical or tropical moist lowland forest, specifically in the understory and lower levels.

It is sedentary.
