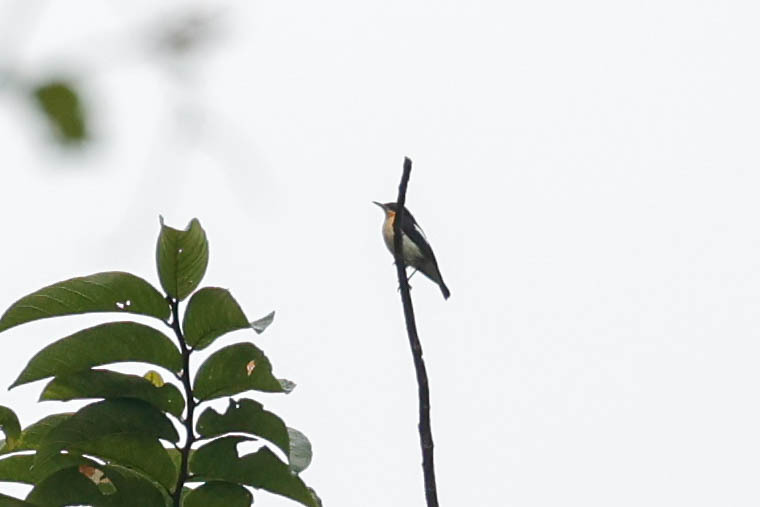

Conservation status
- Endangered (IUCN 3.1)

Scientific classification
- Kingdom: Animalia
- Phylum: Chordata
- Class: Aves
- Order: Passeriformes
- Family: Hyliotidae
- Genus: Hyliota
- Species: H. usambara

Binomial name
- Hyliota usambara W.L. Sclater, 1932

Synonyms
- Hyliota usambarae W.L. Sclater, 1932 [orth. error]

= Usambara hyliota =

Species of bird

The Usambara hyliota (Hyliota usambara) is a species of Hyliota. It is found only in the Usambara Mountains in Tanga Region of Tanzania.

Its natural habitats are subtropical or tropical moist lowland forests, subtropical or tropical moist montane forests, and plantations. It is threatened by habitat loss.
