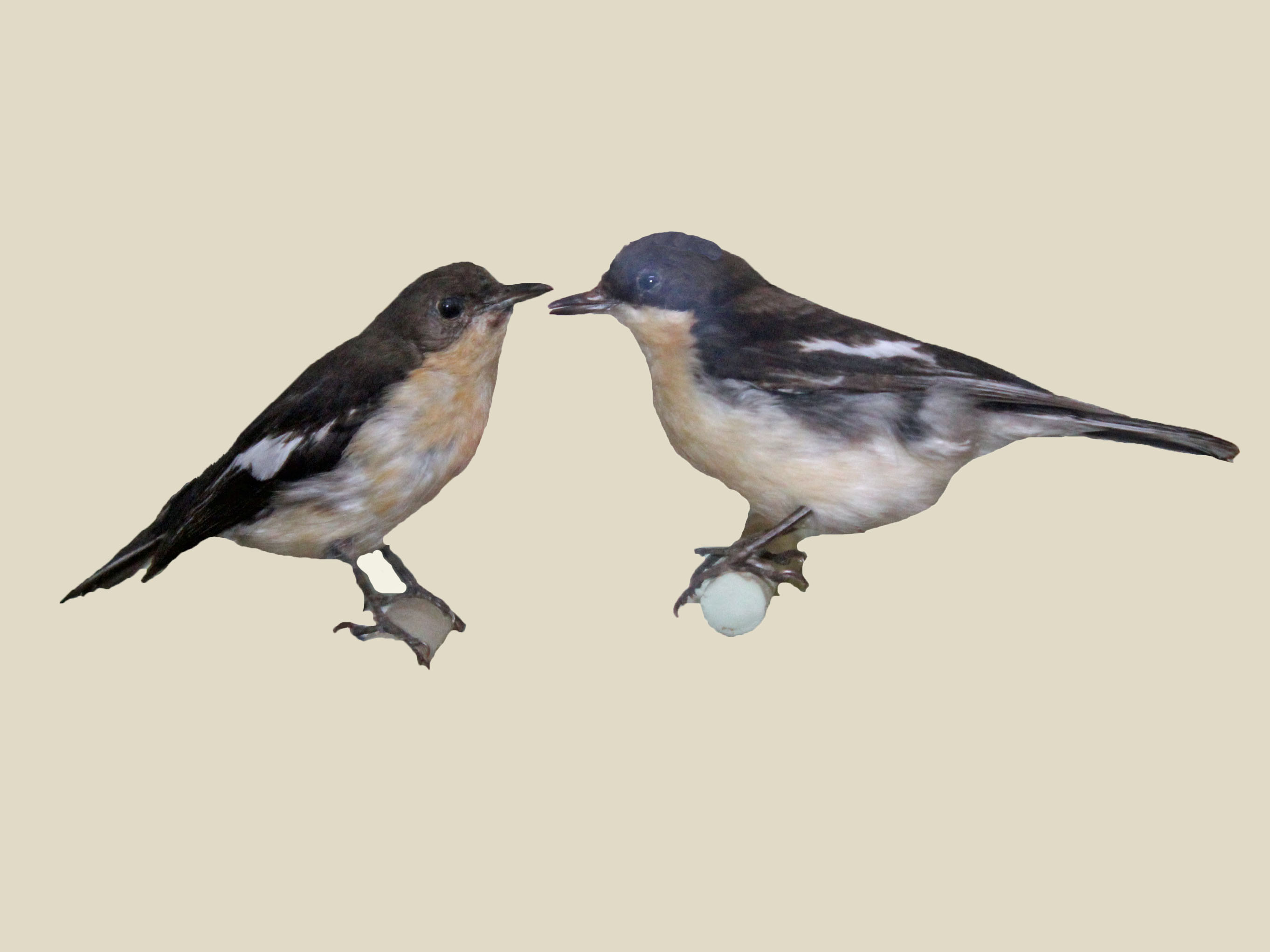
- Female on left; male on right specimen at Nairobi National Museum
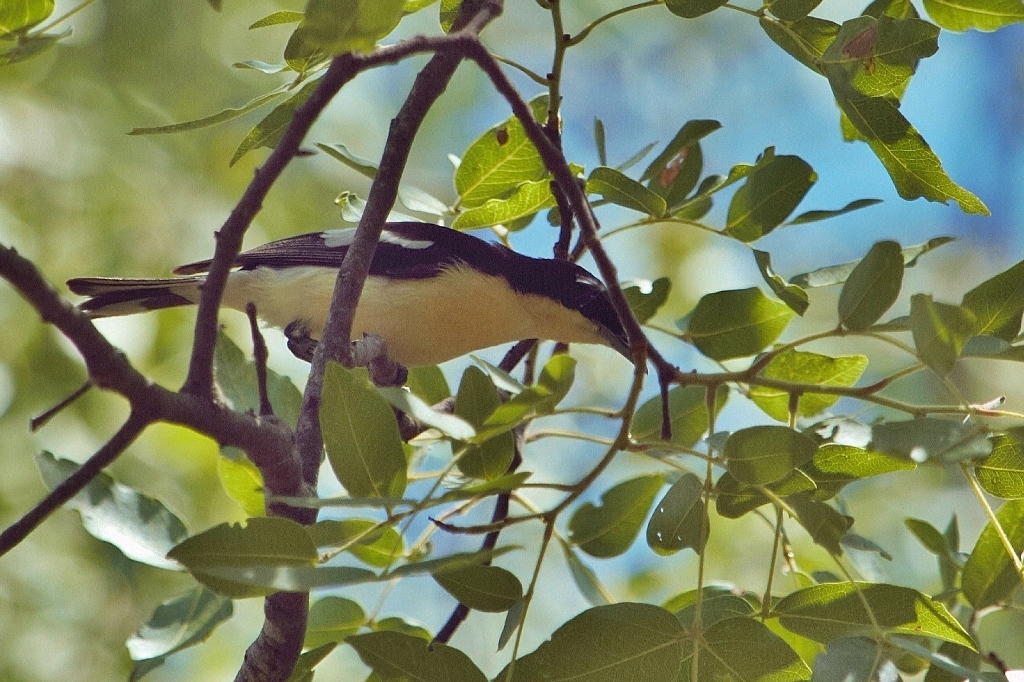
- Live bird

Conservation status
- Least Concern (IUCN 3.1)

Scientific classification
- Kingdom: Animalia
- Phylum: Chordata
- Class: Aves
- Order: Passeriformes
- Family: Hyliotidae
- Genus: Hyliota
- Species: H. australis

Binomial name
- Hyliota australis Shelley, 1882

= Southern hyliota =

Species of bird

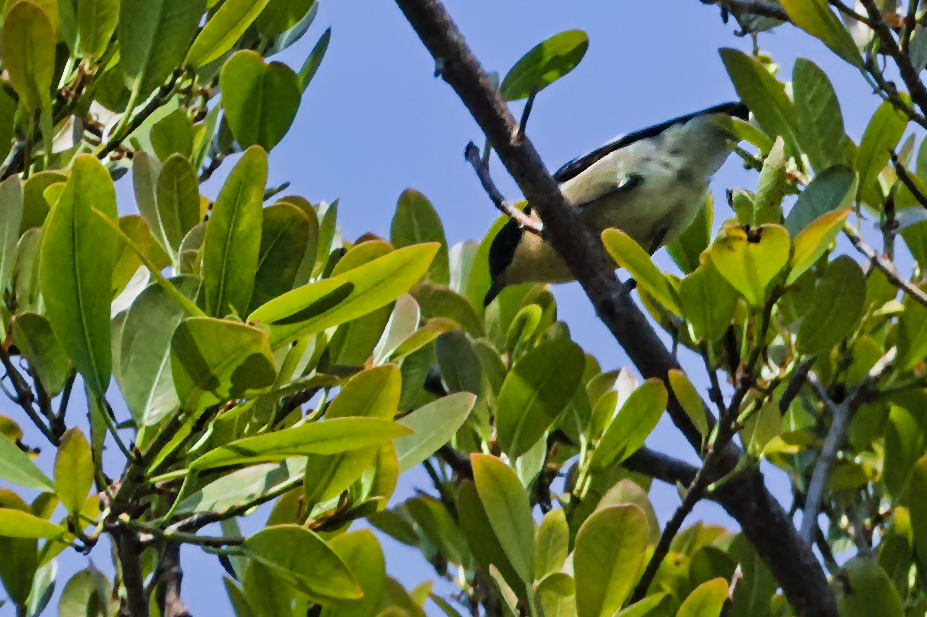
Southern Hyliota

The southern hyliota (Hyliota australis) is a species of Hyliota. It is found in Angola, Cameroon, Democratic Republic of the Congo, Kenya, Malawi, Mozambique, South Africa, Tanzania, Uganda, Zambia, and Zimbabwe. Its natural habitats are subtropical or tropical dry forests and dry savanna.
