= Tanzanian illadopsis =

Conservation status
- Least Concern (IUCN 3.1)

Scientific classification
- Domain: Eukaryota
- Kingdom: Animalia
- Phylum: Chordata
- Class: Aves
- Order: Passeriformes
- Family: Pellorneidae
- Genus: Illadopsis
- Species: I. distans

Binomial name
- Illadopsis distans (Friedmann, 1928)

Species of bird

The Tanzanian illadopsis (Illadopsis distans) is a species of bird in the family Pellorneidae. It is found in Kenya and Tanzania. It was formerly considered a subspecies of the pale-breasted illadopsis (Illadopsis rufipennis). Its natural habitats are subtropical or tropical moist lowland forest and subtropical or tropical moist montane forest.
