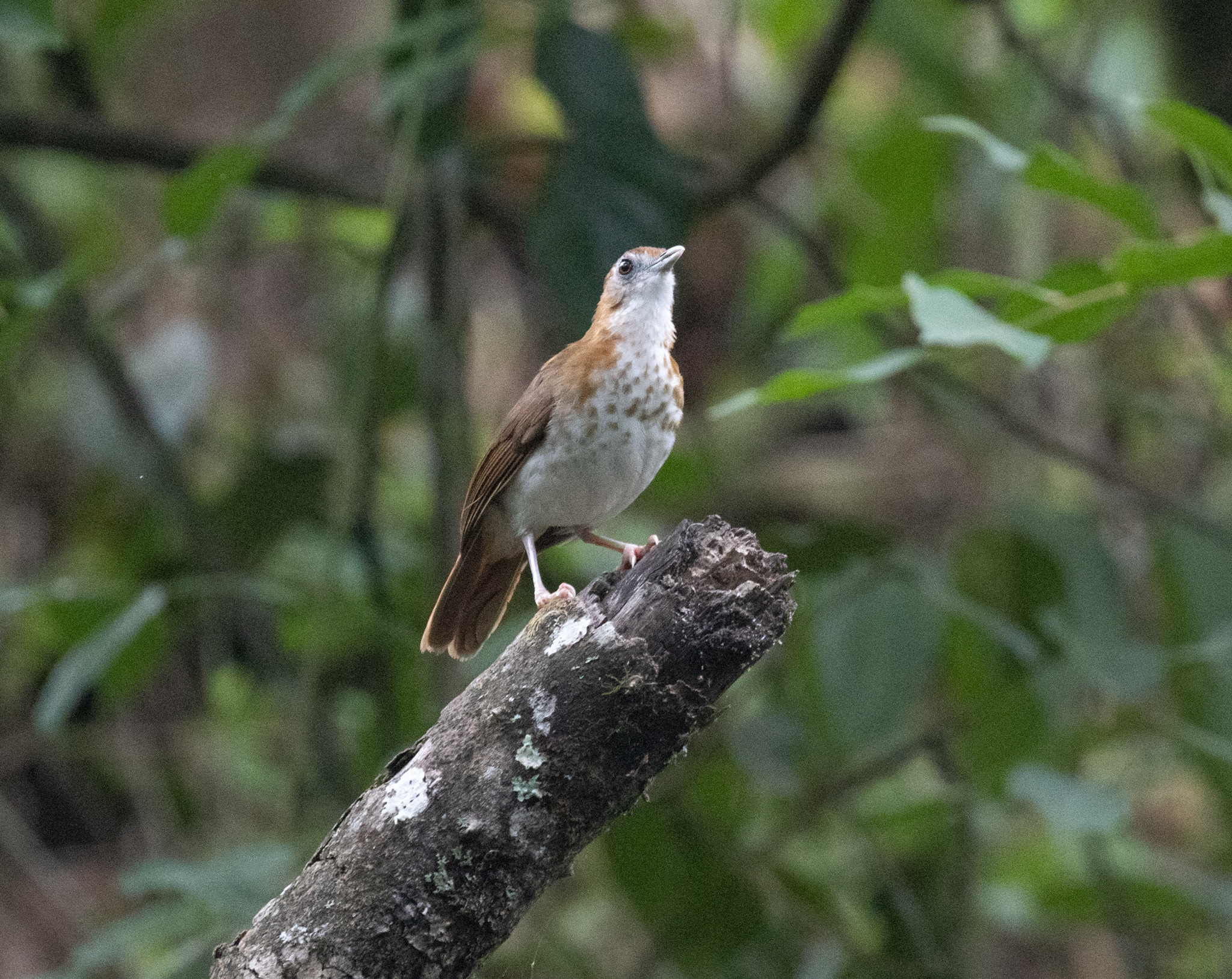

Conservation status
- Least Concern (IUCN 3.1)

Scientific classification
- Kingdom: Animalia
- Phylum: Chordata
- Class: Aves
- Order: Passeriformes
- Family: Pellorneidae
- Genus: Illadopsis
- Species: I. turdina

Binomial name
- Illadopsis turdina (Hartlaub, 1883)

= Spotted thrush-babbler =

Species of bird

The spotted thrush-babbler (Illadopsis turdina) also known as the thrush babbler, is a species of bird in the family Pellorneidae. It is found in Angola, Cameroon, Central African Republic, Democratic Republic of the Congo, South Sudan, and Zambia. Its natural habitats are subtropical or tropical moist lowland forest and subtropical or tropical moist shrubland.
