= Violet-backed hyliota =

Conservation status
- Least Concern (IUCN 3.1)

Scientific classification
- Kingdom: Animalia
- Phylum: Chordata
- Class: Aves
- Order: Passeriformes
- Family: Hyliotidae
- Genus: Hyliota
- Species: H. violacea

Binomial name
- Hyliota violacea Verreaux & Verreaux, 1851

Species of bird

The violet-backed hyliota (Hyliota violacea) is a species of Hyliota. It is sparsely spread across the African tropical rainforest.

== Description ==
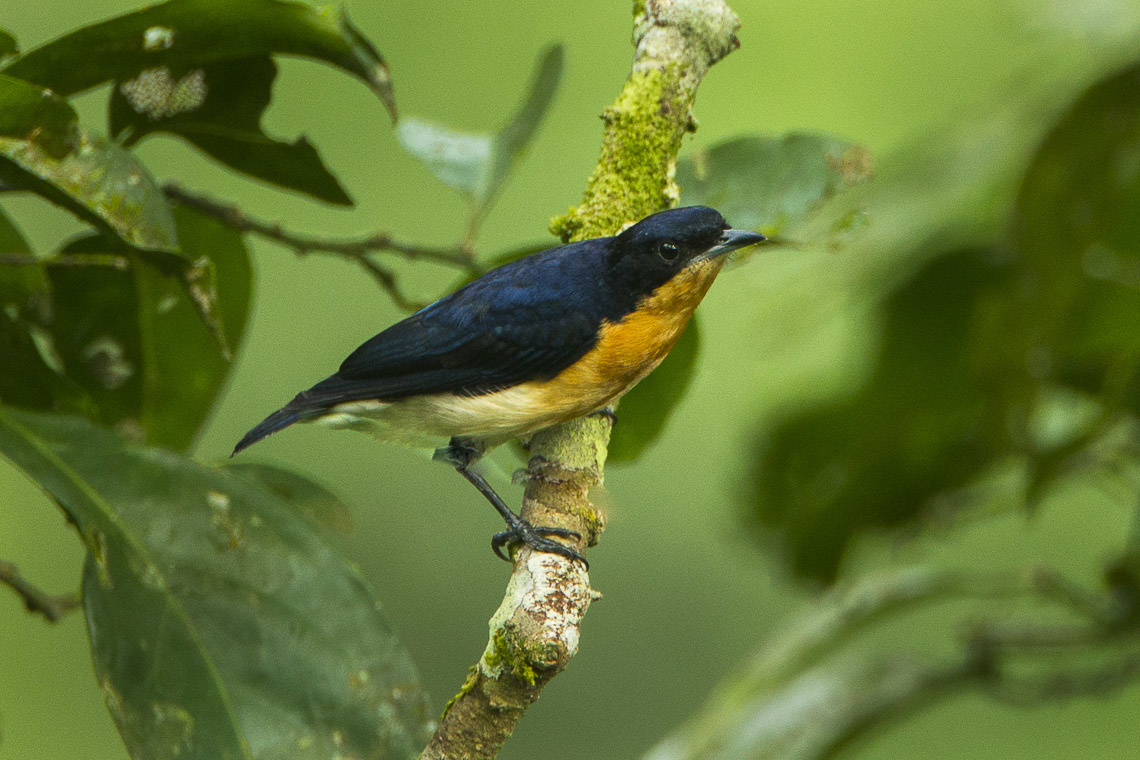
A female bird

It is 13 cm long. Females have orange chests.
