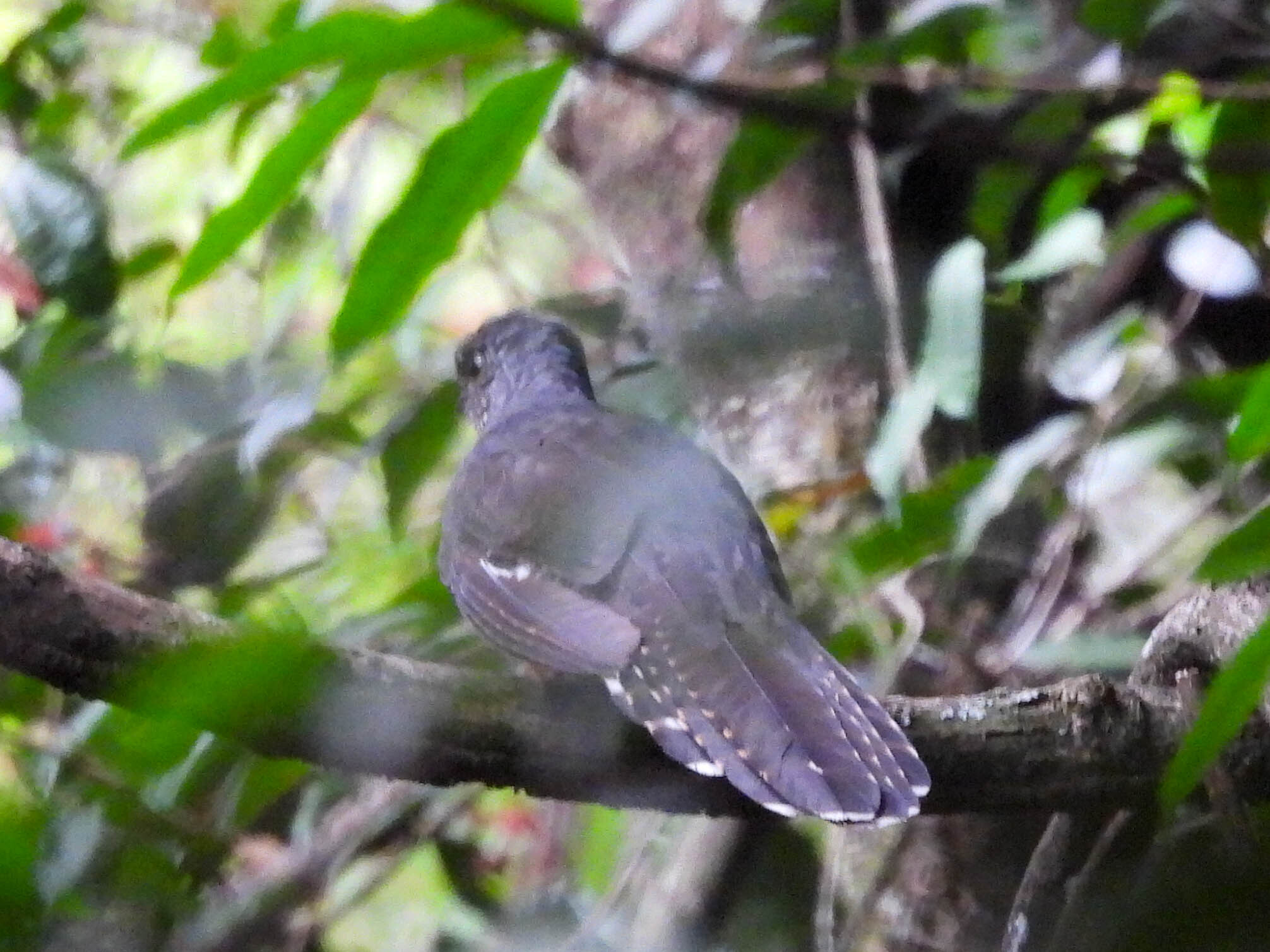

Conservation status
- Least Concern (IUCN 3.1)

Scientific classification
- Kingdom: Animalia
- Phylum: Chordata
- Class: Aves
- Order: Cuculiformes
- Family: Cuculidae
- Genus: Cercococcyx
- Species: C. olivinus

Binomial name
- Cercococcyx olivinus Sassi, 1912

= Olive long-tailed cuckoo =

Species of bird

The olive long-tailed cuckoo (Cercococcyx olivinus) is a species of cuckoo in the family Cuculidae. It is found throughout the African tropical rainforest.

It lays its nests on the ground, and forages from the canopy of trees.

Olive long-tailed cuckoos do not flock in groups.
