= Blackcap illadopsis =

Conservation status
- Least Concern (IUCN 3.1)

Scientific classification
- Kingdom: Animalia
- Phylum: Chordata
- Class: Aves
- Order: Passeriformes
- Family: Pellorneidae
- Genus: Illadopsis
- Species: I. cleaveri

Binomial name
- Illadopsis cleaveri (Shelley, 1874)

Species of bird

The blackcap illadopsis (Illadopsis cleaveri) is a species of bird in the family Pellorneidae. It is native to areas surrounding the Gulf of Guinea (including Bioko island). Its natural habitat is subtropical or tropical moist lowland forest.
