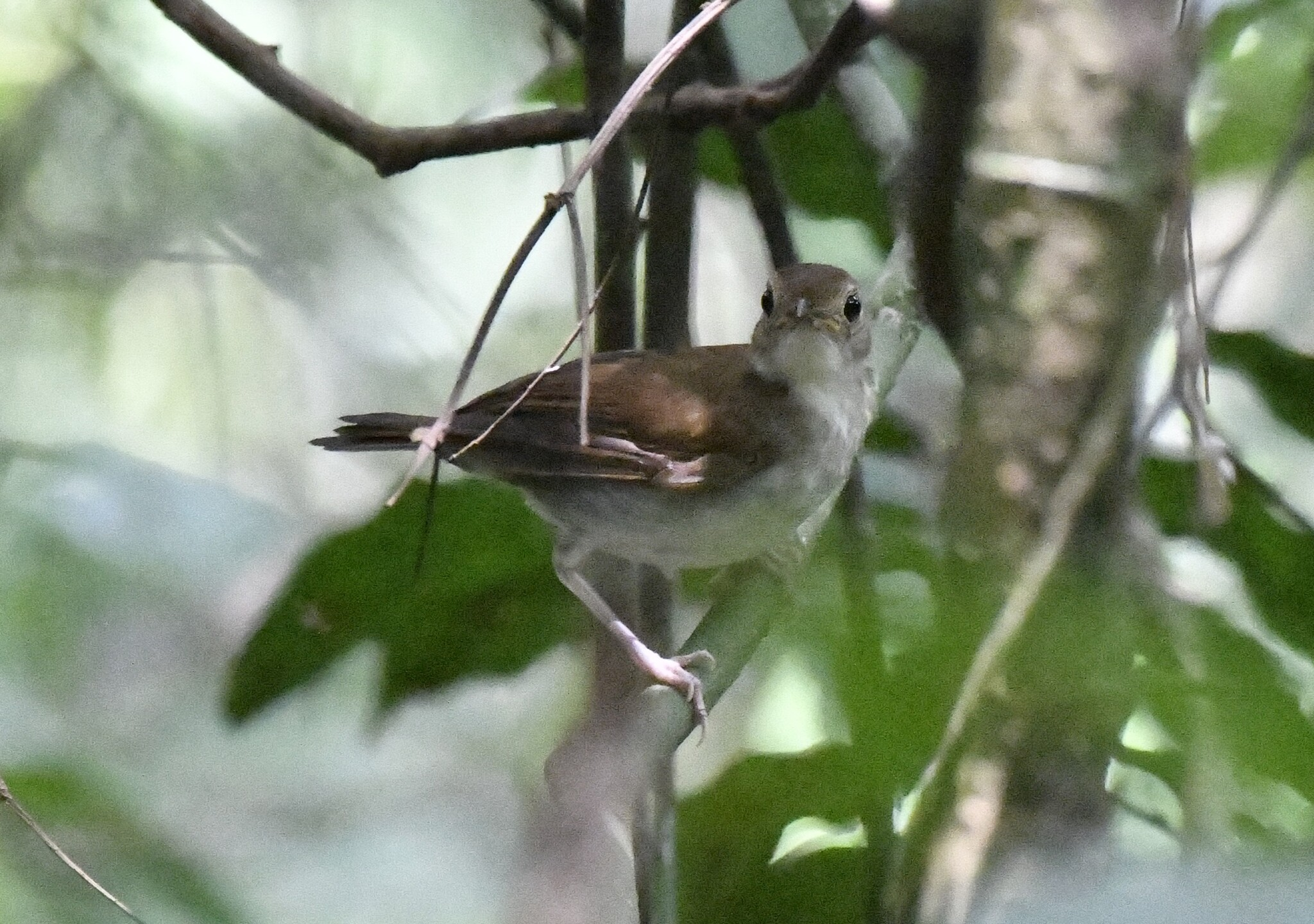

Conservation status
- Near Threatened (IUCN 3.1)

Scientific classification
- Kingdom: Animalia
- Phylum: Chordata
- Class: Aves
- Order: Passeriformes
- Family: Pellorneidae
- Genus: Illadopsis
- Species: I. rufescens

Binomial name
- Illadopsis rufescens (Reichenow, 1878)

= Rufous-winged illadopsis =

Species of bird

The rufous-winged illadopsis (Illadopsis rufescens) is a species of bird in the family Pellorneidae. It is found in Benin, Ivory Coast, Ghana, Guinea, Liberia, Senegal, Sierra Leone, and Togo. Its natural habitats are subtropical or tropical moist lowland forest and subtropical or tropical moist montane forest. It is threatened by habitat loss.
