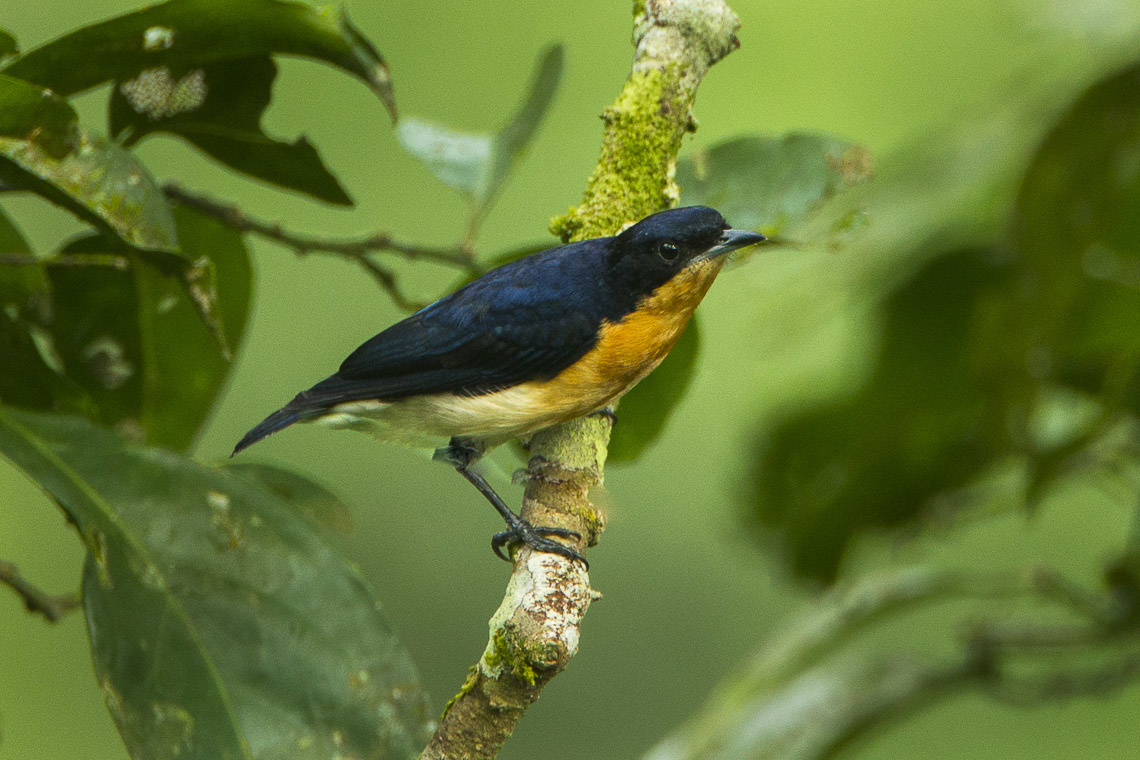
- Violet-backed hyliota (Hyliota violacea)

Scientific classification
- Kingdom: Animalia
- Phylum: Chordata
- Class: Aves
- Order: Passeriformes
- Parvorder: Sylviida
- Family: Hyliotidae; Fjeldså, 2014
- Genus: Hyliota; Swainson, 1837

Type species
- Hyliota flavigaster Swainson, 1837

= Hyliota =

Genus of birds

The hyliotas are a genus, Hyliota, of passerine bird from Africa. The taxonomic position of the genus has been a longstanding mystery. They have been formerly regarded as Old World warblers in the family Sylviidae, or related to the batises and wattle-eyes in the family Platysteiridae, bush-shrikes in the family Malaconotidae, or even Old-World flycatchers in the family Muscicapidae. An analysis of the mitochondrial DNA of the genus and possible relatives found they have no close relatives and are basal in the clade Passerida. They are now often regarded as a family in their own right, Hyliotidae.

The hyliotas are found in the canopy of broad-leaf forests. They usually do not live in groups but will join mixed-species feeding flocks with other species. They are territorial and pairs are monogamous, nesting in camouflaged woven nests.

== Species ==
Hyliota contains the following four species:

| Image | Common name | Scientific name | Distribution |
|---|---|---|---|
| | Southern hyliota | Hyliota australis | Angola, Cameroon, Democratic Republic of the Congo, Kenya, Malawi, Mozambique, South Africa, Tanzania, Uganda, Zambia, and Zimbabwe. |
| | Yellow-bellied hyliota | Hyliota flavigaster | Angola, Burkina Faso, Burundi, Cameroon, Central African Republic, Republic of the Congo, Democratic Republic of the Congo, Ivory Coast, Ethiopia, Gabon, Gambia, Ghana, Guinea, Guinea-Bissau, Kenya, Malawi, Mali, Mozambique, Nigeria, Rwanda, Senegal, Sierra Leone, South Sudan, Tanzania, Togo, Uganda, and Zambia. |
| | Usambara hyliota | Hyliota usambara | Usambara Mountains in Tanga Region of Tanzania. |
| | Violet-backed hyliota | Hyliota violacea | Sparsely across African tropical rainforest. |
