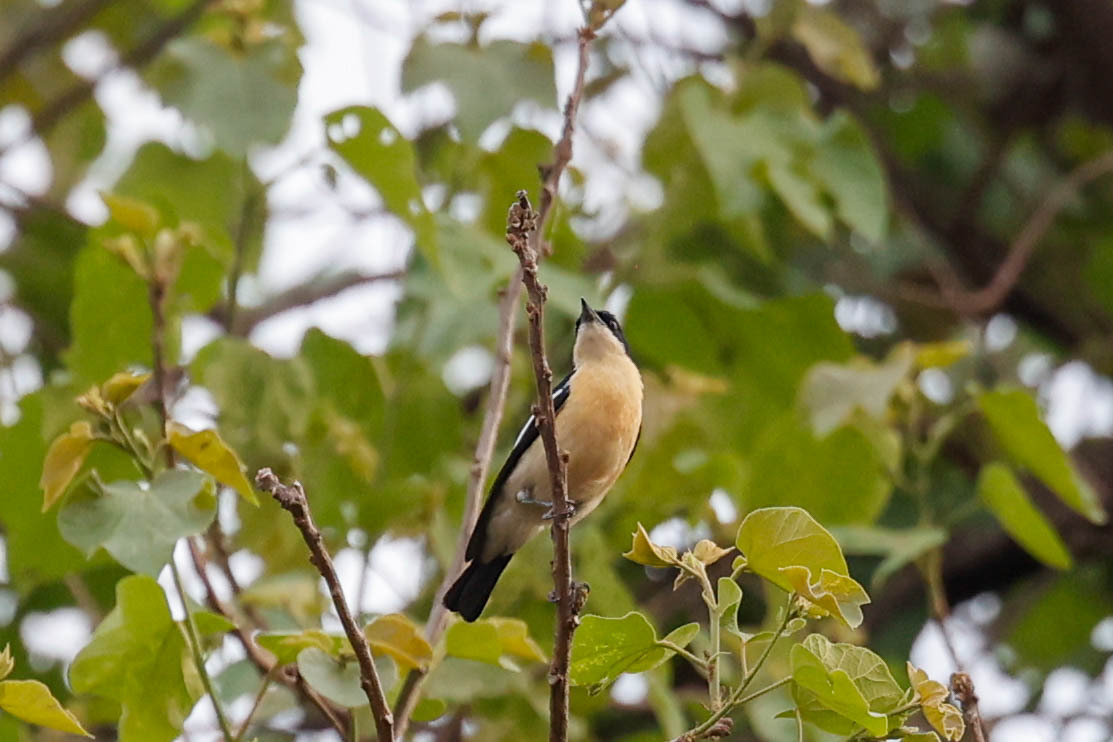

Conservation status
- Least Concern (IUCN 3.1)

Scientific classification
- Kingdom: Animalia
- Phylum: Chordata
- Class: Aves
- Order: Passeriformes
- Family: Hyliotidae
- Genus: Hyliota
- Species: H. flavigaster

Binomial name
- Hyliota flavigaster Swainson, 1837

= Yellow-bellied hyliota =

Species of bird

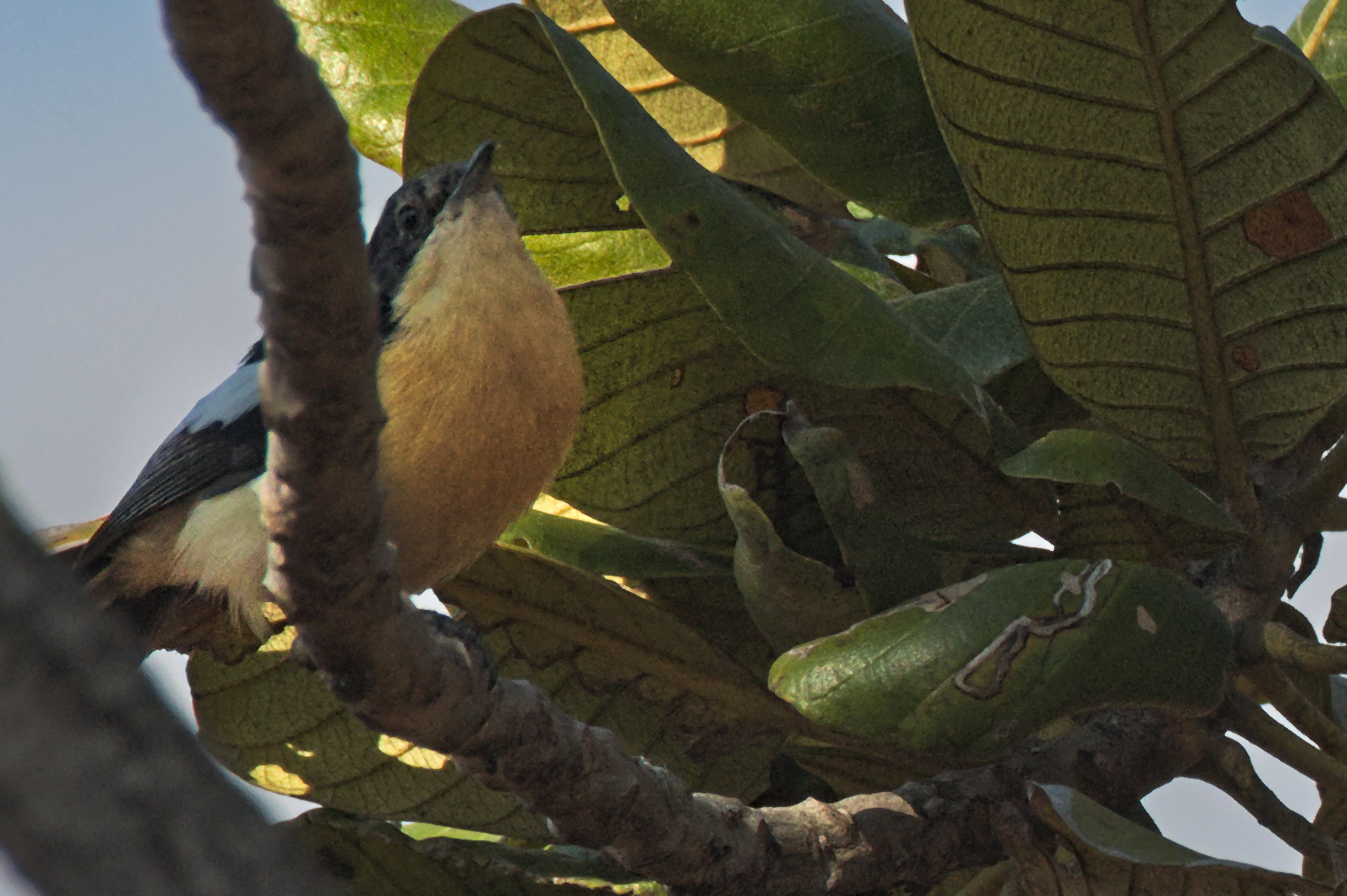
Yellow-bellied hyliota

The yellow-bellied hyliota (Hyliota flavigaster) is a species of Hyliota. It is found in Angola, Burkina Faso, Burundi, Cameroon, Central African Republic, Republic of the Congo, Democratic Republic of the Congo, Ivory Coast, Ethiopia, Gabon, Gambia, Ghana, Guinea, Guinea-Bissau, Kenya, Malawi, Mali, Mozambique, Nigeria, Rwanda, Senegal, Sierra Leone, South Sudan, Tanzania, Togo, Uganda, and Zambia. Its natural habitat is subtropical or tropical dry forests.
