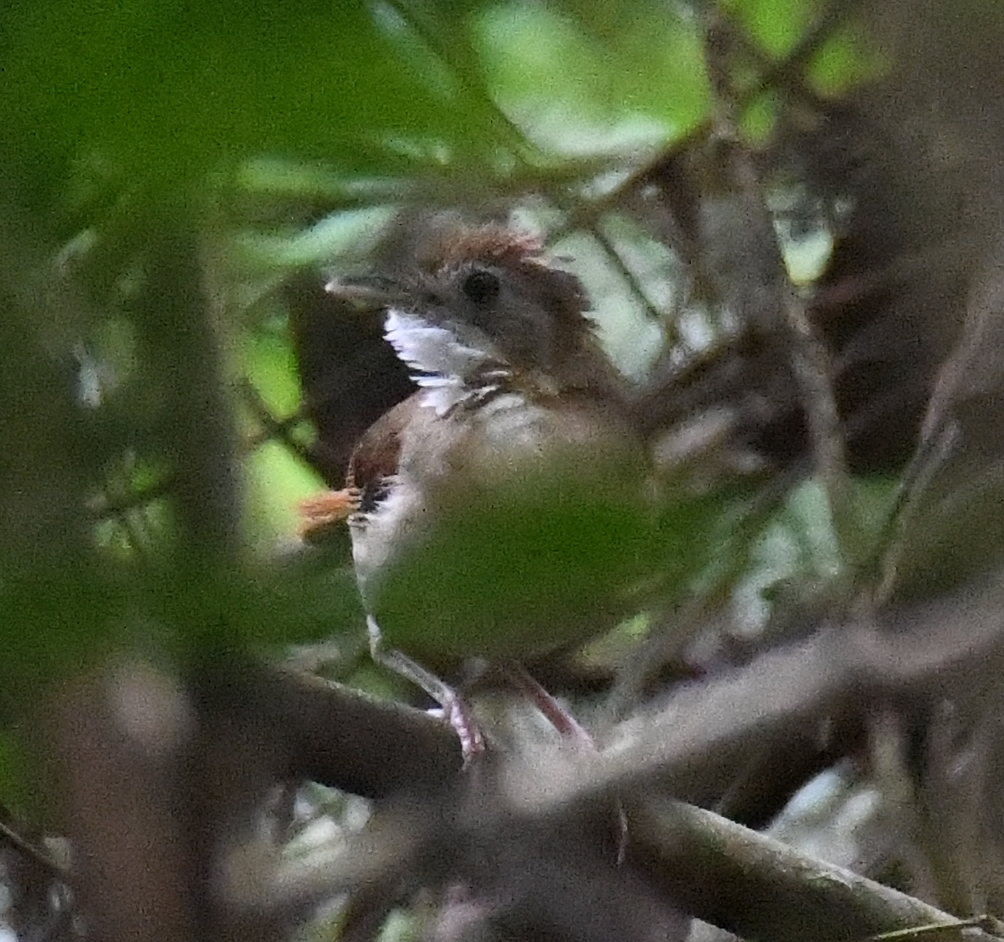

Conservation status
- Least Concern (IUCN 3.1)

Scientific classification
- Kingdom: Animalia
- Phylum: Chordata
- Class: Aves
- Order: Passeriformes
- Family: Pellorneidae
- Genus: Illadopsis
- Species: I. puveli

Binomial name
- Illadopsis puveli (Salvadori, 1901)

= Puvel's illadopsis =

Species of bird

Puvel's illadopsis (Illadopsis puveli) is a species of bird in the family Pellorneidae. Its horizontal interrupted range of presence extends across the African tropical rainforest (mainly West Africa, on either side of the Dahomey Gap). Its natural habitats are subtropical or tropical dry forest, subtropical or tropical moist lowland forest, and subtropical or tropical moist shrubland.
