= Pale-breasted illadopsis =

- In Ankasa Conservation Area, Ghana

Conservation status
- Least Concern (IUCN 3.1)

Scientific classification
- Kingdom: Animalia
- Phylum: Chordata
- Class: Aves
- Order: Passeriformes
- Family: Pellorneidae
- Genus: Illadopsis
- Species: I. rufipennis

Binomial name
- Illadopsis rufipennis (Sharpe, 1872)

Species of bird

The pale-breasted illadopsis (Illadopsis rufipennis) is a species of bird in the family Pellorneidae. It is found throughout the African tropical rainforest (including Bioko). The Tanzanian illadopsis was formerly considered a subspecies. Its natural habitats are subtropical or tropical moist lowland forest and subtropical or tropical moist montane forest.
