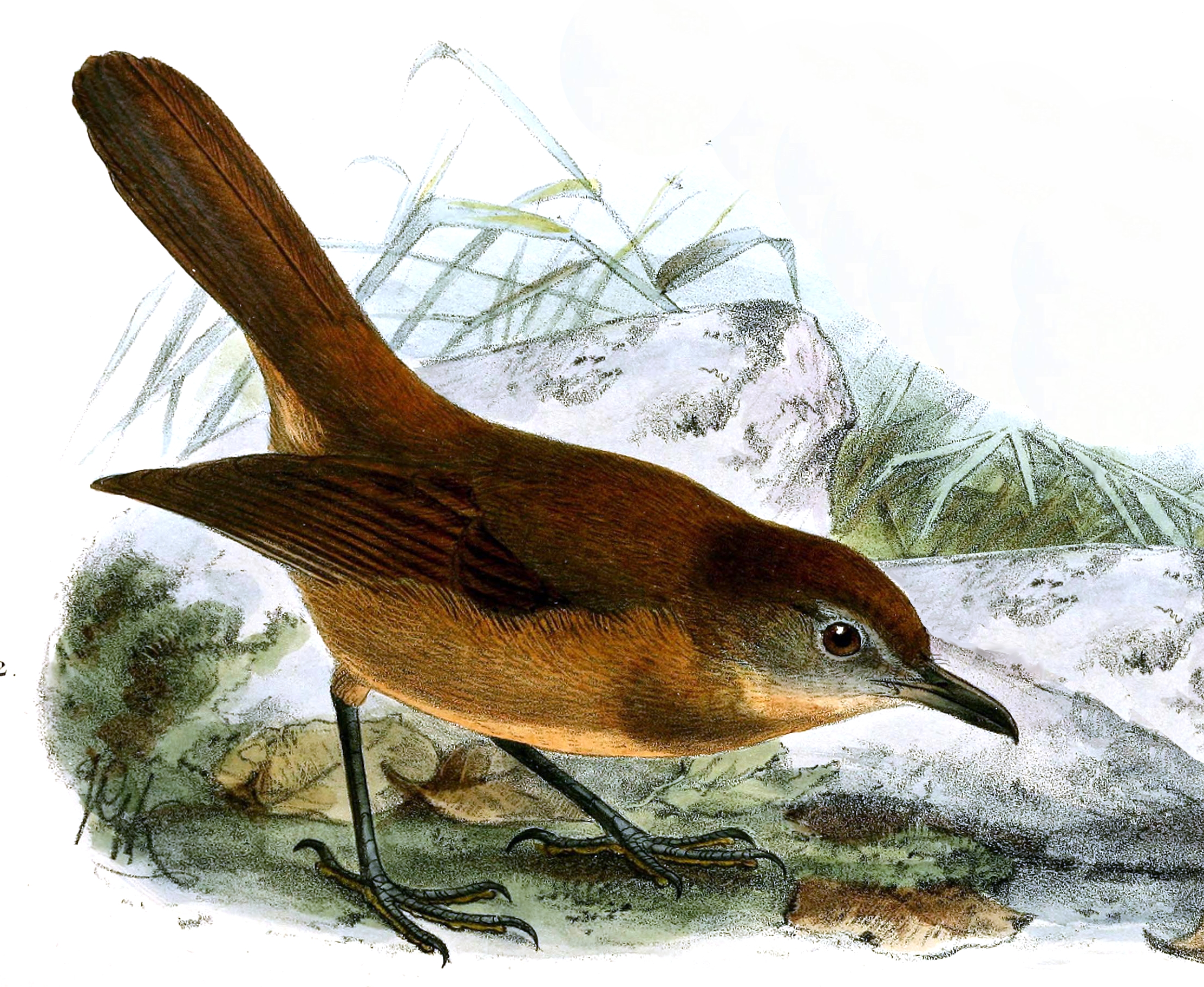

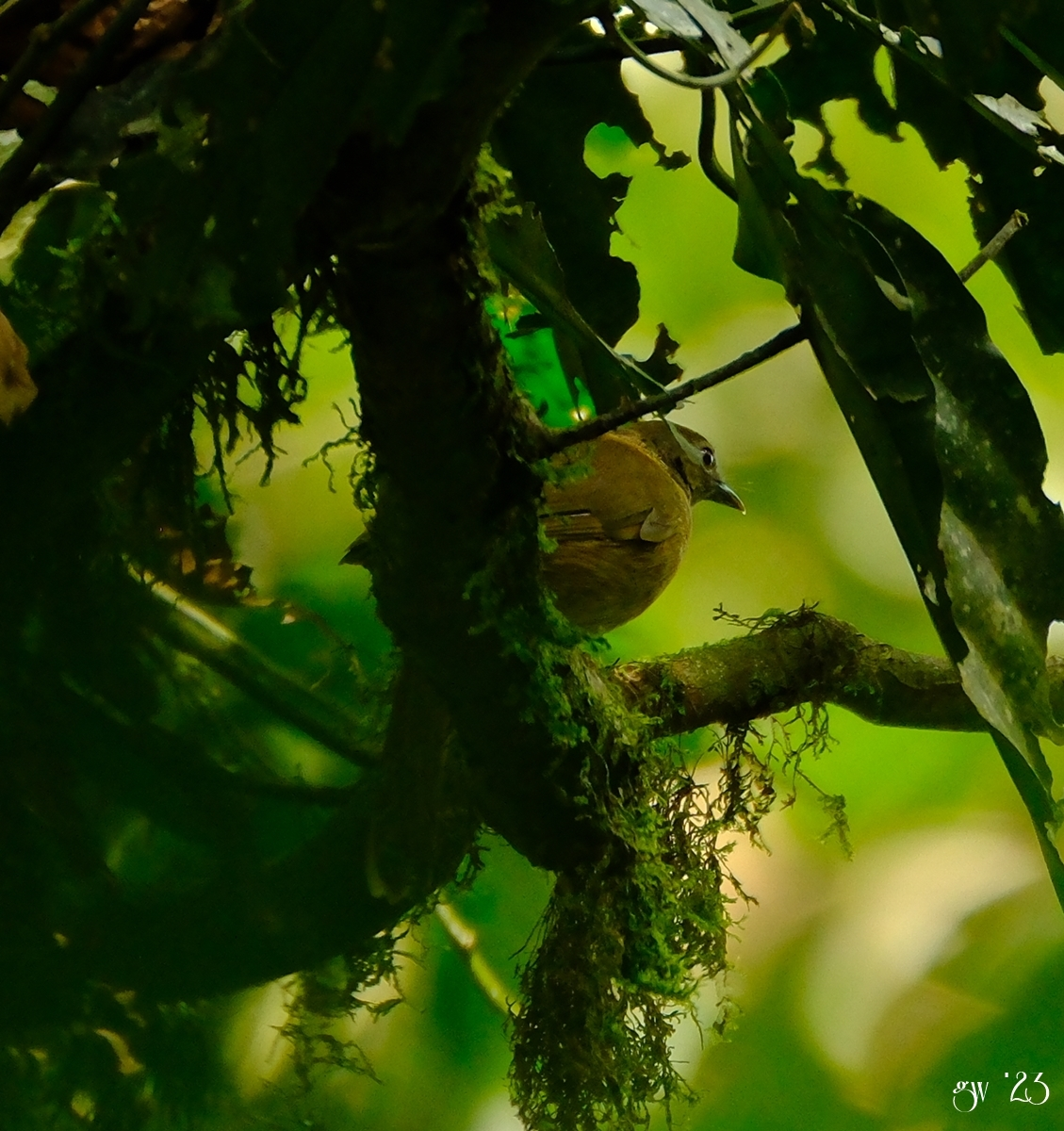

Conservation status
- Least Concern (IUCN 3.1)

Scientific classification
- Kingdom: Animalia
- Phylum: Chordata
- Class: Aves
- Order: Passeriformes
- Family: Pellorneidae
- Genus: Illadopsis
- Species: I. fulvescens

Binomial name
- Illadopsis fulvescens (Cassin, 1859)

= Brown illadopsis =

Species of bird

The brown illadopsis (Illadopsis fulvescens) or brown thrush-babbler, is a species of bird in the family Pellorneidae. The species was first described by John Cassin in 1859. It is widely spread throughout the African tropical rainforest. Its natural habitats are subtropical or tropical dry forests and subtropical or tropical moist lowland forests.
