= List of birds of Seychelles =

This is a list of the bird species recorded by Seychelles Bird Records Committee (SBRC) in Seychelles up to 25 October 2022 SBRC. It includes 279 species per The Clements Checklist of Birds of the World plus yellow-billed kite, currently treated by Clements as a subspecies of black kite, which has also been recorded in Seychelles, and also Asian plain martin and African plain martin, both of which have been recorded in Seychelles but are currently classed as races of the same species, plain martin. Fourteen extant species are endemic. Ten have been introduced by humans although the red fody is possibly native. Of these 139 (or 178 as per the SBRC list of 1 January 2020) are rare or accidental. Eleven species listed are extinct or extirpated in the Seychelles. Sixteen species are globally threatened.

In August 2025, SBRC adopted the AviList taxonomy. A new list has been produced of 286 species recorded in Seychelles up to 1 August 2025 .

This list's taxonomic treatment (designation and sequence of orders, families and species) and nomenclature (common and scientific names) follow the conventions of The Clements Checklist of Birds of the World, 2022 edition. The family accounts at the beginning of each heading reflect this taxonomy, as do the species counts found in each family account. Introduced and accidental species are included in the total counts for the Seychelles.

The following tags have been used to highlight several categories. The commonly occurring native species do not fall into any of these categories.

- (A) Accidental - a species that rarely or accidentally occurs in the Seychelles
- (E) Endemic - a species endemic to the Seychelles
- (I) Introduced - a species introduced to the Seychelles as a consequence, direct or indirect, of human actions
- (Ex) Extirpated - a species that no longer occurs in the Seychelles although populations exist elsewhere

== Ducks, geese, and waterfowl ==
Order: Anseriformes Family: Anatidae

Anatidae includes the ducks and most duck-like waterfowl, such as geese and swans. These birds are adapted to an aquatic existence with webbed feet, flattened bills, and feathers that are excellent at shedding water due to an oily coating.

- White-faced whistling-duck, Dendrocygna viduata (A)
- Knob-billed duck, Sarkidiornis melanotos (A)
- Ruddy shelduck, Tadorna ferruginea (A)
- Garganey, Spatula querquedula
- Northern shoveler, Spatula clypeata (A)
- Eurasian wigeon, Mareca penelope (A)
- Mallard, Anas platyrhynchos (A)
- Red-billed duck, Anas erythrorhyncha (A)
- Northern pintail, Anas acuta (A)
- Green-winged teal, Anas acuta (A)
- Ferruginous pochard, Aythya nyroca (A)
- Tufted duck, Aythya fuligula (A)

== Pheasants, grouse, and allies ==
Order: Galliformes Family: Phasianidae

The Phasianidae are a family of terrestrial birds which consists of quails, partridges, snowcocks, francolins, spurfowls, tragopans, monals, pheasants, peafowls and jungle fowls. In general, they are plump (although they vary in size) and have broad, relatively short wings.

- Grey francolin, Francolinus pondicerianus (I)
- Common quail, Coturnix coturnix (A)

== Flamingos ==
Order: Phoenicopteriformes Family: Phoenicopteridae

Flamingos are gregarious wading birds, usually 3 to 5 feet (0.9 to 1.5 m) tall, found in both the Western and Eastern Hemispheres. Flamingos filter-feed on shellfish and algae. Their oddly shaped beaks are specially adapted to separate mud and silt from the food they consume and, uniquely, are used upside-down.

- Greater flamingo, Phoenicopterus roseus

== Grebes ==
Order: Podicipediformes Family: Podicipedidae

Grebes are small to medium-large freshwater diving birds. They have lobed toes and are excellent swimmers and divers. However, they have their feet placed far back on the body, making them quite ungainly on land.

- Black-necked grebe, Podiceps nigricollis (A)

== Pigeons and doves ==
Order: Columbiformes Family: Columbidae

Pigeons and doves are stout-bodied birds with short necks and short slender bills with a fleshy cere.

- Rock pigeon, Columba livia (I)
- European turtle-dove, Streptopelia turtur (A)
- Malagasy turtle-dove, Nesoenas picturatus
- Namaqua dove, Oena capensis (A)
- Zebra dove, Geopelia striata (I)
- Comoro blue-pigeon, Alectroenas sganzini
- Seychelles blue-pigeon, Alectroenas pulcherrimus (E)

== Cuckoos ==
Order: Cuculiformes Family: Cuculidae

The family Cuculidae includes cuckoos, roadrunners and anis. These birds are of variable size with slender bodies, long tails and strong legs. The Old World cuckoos are brood parasites.

- Malagasy coucal, Centropus toulou
- Great spotted cuckoo, Clamator glandarius (A)
- Pied cuckoo, Clamator jacobinus (A)
- Lesser cuckoo, Cuculus poliocephalus (A)
- Common cuckoo, Cuculus canorus (A)

== Nightjars and allies ==
Order: Caprimulgiformes Family: Caprimulgidae

Nightjars are medium-sized nocturnal birds that usually nest on the ground. They have long wings, short legs and very short bills. Most have small feet, of little use for walking, and long pointed wings. Their soft plumage is camouflaged to resemble bark or leaves.

- Eurasian nightjar, Caprimulgus europaeus (A)
- Madagascar nightjar, Caprimulgus madagascariensis

== Swifts ==
Order: Caprimulgiformes Family: Apodidae

Swifts are small birds which spend the majority of their lives flying. These birds have very short legs and never settle voluntarily on the ground, perching instead only on vertical surfaces. Many swifts have long swept-back wings which resemble a crescent or boomerang.

- White-throated needletail, Hirundapus caudacutus (A)
- Seychelles swiftlet, Aerodramus elaphrus (E)
- Alpine swift, Apus melba (A)
- Common swift, Apus apus (A)
- Pacific swift, Apus pacificus (A)
- Little swift, Apus affinis (A)

== Rails, gallinules, and coots ==
Order: Gruiformes Family: Rallidae

Rallidae is a large family of small to medium-sized birds which includes the rails, crakes, coots and gallinules. Typically they inhabit dense vegetation in damp environments near lakes, swamps or rivers. In general they are shy and secretive birds, making them difficult to observe. Most species have strong legs and long toes which are well adapted to soft uneven surfaces. They tend to have short, rounded wings and to be weak fliers.

- White-throated rail, Dryolimnas cuvieri
- Corn crake, Crex crex (A)
- Spotted crake, Porzana porzana (A)
- Lesser moorhen, Paragallinula angulata (A)
- Eurasian moorhen, Gallinula chloropus
- Allen's gallinule, Porphyrio alleni (A)
- African swamphen, Porphyrio madagascariensis (Ex)
- White-breasted waterhen, Amaurornis phoenicurus (A)
- Striped crake, Amaurornis marginalis (A)
- Little crake, Zapornia parva (A)

== Thick-knees ==
Order: Charadriiformes Family: Burhinidae

The thick-knees are a group of largely tropical waders in the family Burhinidae. They are found worldwide within the tropical zone, with some species also breeding in temperate Europe and Australia. They are medium to large waders with strong black or yellow-black bills, large yellow eyes and cryptic plumage. Despite being classed as waders, most species have a preference for arid or semi-arid habitats.

- Eurasian thick-knee, Burhinus oedicnemus (A)

== Stilts and Avocets ==
Order: Charadriiformes Family: Recurvirostridae

Recurvirostridae is a family of large wading birds, which includes the avocets and stilts. The avocets have long legs and long up-curved bills. The stilts have extremely long legs and long, thin, straight bills.

- Black-winged stilt, Himantopus himantopus (A)
- Pied avocet, Recurvirostra avosetta (A)

== Oystercatchers ==
Order: Charadriiformes Family: Haematopodidae

The oystercatchers are large and noisy plover-like birds, with strong bills used for smashing or prising open molluscs.

- Eurasian oystercatcher, Haematopus ostralegus (A)

== Plovers and lapwings ==
Order: Charadriiformes Family: Charadriidae

The family Charadriidae includes the plovers, dotterels and lapwings. They are small to medium-sized birds with compact bodies, short, thick necks and long, usually pointed, wings. They are found in open country worldwide, mostly in habitats near water.

- Grey plover, Pluvialis squatarola
- Pacific golden-plover, Pluvialis fulva
- Spur-winged lapwing, Vanellus spinosus (A)
- Senegal lapwing, Vanellus lugubris (A)
- Sociable lapwing, Vanellus gregarius (A)
- Lesser sand-plover, Charadrius mongolus
- Greater sand-plover, Charadrius leschenaultii
- Caspian plover, Charadrius asiaticus (A)
- Common ringed plover, Charadrius hiaticula
- Little ringed plover, Charadrius dubius (A)
- Oriental plover, Charadrius veredus (A)

== Painted-snipes ==
Order: Charadriiformes Family: Rostratulidae

Painted-snipes are short-legged, long-billed birds similar in shape to the true snipes, but more brightly coloured.

- Greater painted-snipe, Rostratula benghalensis (A)

== Sandpipers and allies ==
Order: Charadriiformes Family: Scolopacidae

Scolopacidae is a large diverse family of small to medium-sized shorebirds including the sandpipers, curlews, godwits, shanks, tattlers, woodcocks, snipes, dowitchers and phalaropes. The majority of these species eat small invertebrates picked out of the mud or soil. Variation in length of legs and bills enables multiple species to feed in the same habitat, particularly on the coast, without direct competition for food.

- Whimbrel, Numenius phaeopus
- Little curlew, Numenius minutus (A)
- Eurasian curlew, Numenius arquata
- Bar-tailed godwit, Limosa lapponica
- Black-tailed godwit, Limosa limosa (A)
- Ruddy turnstone, Arenaria interpres
- Great knot, Calidris tenuirostris (A)
- Red knot, Calidris canutus (A)
- Ruff, Calidris pugnax (A)
- Broad-billed sandpiper, Calidris falcinellus (A)
- Sharp-tailed sandpiper, Calidris acuminata (A)
- Curlew sandpiper, Calidris ferruginea
- Temminck's stint, Calidris temminckii (A)
- Long-toed stint, Calidris subminuta (A)
- Sanderling, Calidris alba
- Little stint, Calidris minuta (A)
- Buff-breasted sandpiper, Calidris subruficollis (A)
- Pectoral sandpiper, Calidris melanotos (A)
- Jack snipe, Lymnocryptes minimus (A)
- Great snipe, Gallinago media (A)
- Common snipe, Gallinago gallinago (A)
- Pin-tailed snipe, Gallinago stenura (A)
- Terek sandpiper, Xenus cinereus
- Red-necked phalarope, Phalaropus lobatus (A)
- Common sandpiper, Actitis hypoleucos
- Green sandpiper, Tringa ochropus (A)
- Grey-tailed tattler, Tringa brevipes (A)
- Spotted redshank, Tringa erythropus (A)
- Common greenshank, Tringa nebularia
- Marsh sandpiper, Tringa stagnatilis (A)
- Wood sandpiper, Tringa glareola
- Common redshank, Tringa totanus (A)

== Crab-plover ==
Order: Charadriiformes Family: Dromadidae

The crab-plover is related to the waders. It resembles a plover but with very long grey legs and a strong heavy black bill similar to a tern. It has black-and-white plumage, a long neck, partially webbed feet and a bill designed for eating crabs.

- Crab-plover, Dromas ardeola

== Pratincoles and coursers ==
Order: Charadriiformes Family: Glareolidae

Glareolidae is a family of wading birds comprising the pratincoles, which have short legs, long pointed wings and long forked tails, and the coursers, which have long legs, short wings and long, pointed bills which curve downwards.

- Collared pratincole, Glareola pratincola (A)
- Oriental pratincole, Glareola maldivarum (A)
- Black-winged pratincole, Glareola nordmanni (A)
- Madagascar pratincole, Glareola ocularis (A)

== Skuas and jaegers ==
Order: Charadriiformes Family: Stercorariidae

The family Stercorariidae are, in general, medium to large birds, typically with grey or brown plumage, often with white markings on the wings. They nest on the ground in temperate and arctic regions and are long-distance migrants.

- South polar skua, Stercorarius maccormicki (A)
- Brown skua, Stercorarius antarctica (A)
- Pomarine skua, Stercorarius pomarinus (A)
- Arctic skua, Stercorarius parasiticus (A)

== Gulls, terns, and skimmers ==
Order: Charadriiformes Family: Laridae

Laridae is a family of medium to large seabirds, the gulls, terns, and skimmers. Gulls are typically grey or white, often with black markings on the head or wings. They have stout, longish bills and webbed feet. Terns are a group of generally medium to large seabirds typically with grey or white plumage, often with black markings on the head. Most terns hunt fish by diving but some pick insects off the surface of fresh water. Terns are generally long-lived birds, with several species known to live in excess of 30 years.

- Black-headed gull, Chroicocephalus ridibundus (A)
- Franklin's gull, Leucophaeus pipixcan (A)
- Sooty gull, Ichthyaetus hemprichii (A)
- Lesser black-backed gull, Larus fuscus (A)
- Brown noddy, Anous stolidus
- Lesser noddy, Anous tenuirostris
- White tern, Gygis alba
- Sooty tern, Onychoprion fuscatus
- Bridled tern, Onychoprion anaethetus
- Little tern, Sternula albifrons (A)
- Saunders's tern, Sternula saundersi
- Gull-billed tern, Gelochelidon nilotica (A)
- Caspian tern, Hydroprogne caspia
- White-winged tern, Chlidonias leucopterus
- Whiskered tern, Chlidonias hybrida (A)
- Roseate tern, Sterna dougallii
- Black-naped tern, Sterna sumatrana
- Common tern, Sterna hirundo
- White-cheeked tern, Sterna repressa (A)
- Great crested tern, Thalasseus bergii
- Sandwich tern, Thalasseus sandvicensis (A)
- Lesser crested tern, Thalasseus bengalensis

== Tropicbirds ==
Order: Phaethontiformes Family: Phaethontidae

Tropicbirds are slender white birds of tropical oceans, with exceptionally long central tail feathers. Their heads and long wings have black markings.

- White-tailed tropicbird, Phaethon lepturus
- Red-billed tropicbird, Phaethon aethereus (A)
- Red-tailed tropicbird, Phaethon rubricauda

== Southern storm-petrels ==
Order: Procellariiformes Family: Oceanitidae

The southern storm-petrels are relatives of the petrels and are the smallest seabirds. They feed on planktonic crustaceans and small fish picked from the surface, typically while hovering. The flight is fluttering and sometimes bat-like.

- Wilson's storm-petrel, Oceanites oceanicus (A)
- White-faced storm-petrel, Pelagodroma marina (A)
- Black-bellied storm-petrel, Fregetta tropica (A)

== Northern storm-petrels ==
Order: Procellariiformes Family: Hydrobatidae

Though the members of this family are similar in many respects to the southern storm-petrels, including their general appearance and habits, there are enough genetic differences to warrant their placement in a separate family.

- Swinhoe's storm-petrel, Hydrobates monorhis (A)
- Matsudaira's storm-petrel, Hydrobates matsudairae (A)

== Shearwaters and petrels ==
Order: Procellariiformes Family: Procellariidae

The procellariids are the main group of medium-sized "true petrels", characterised by united nostrils with medium septum and a long outer functional primary.

- Southern giant-petrel, Macronectes giganteus (A)
- Cape petrel, Daption capense (A)
- Kermadec petrel, Pterodroma neglecta (A)
- Trindade petrel, Pterodroma arminjoniana (A)
- Herald petrel, Pterodroma heraldica (A)
- Bulwer's petrel, Bulweria bulwerii (A)
- Flesh-footed shearwater, Ardenna carneipes (A)
- Wedge-tailed shearwater, Ardenna pacificus
- Tropical shearwater, Puffinus bailloni

== Storks ==
Order: Ciconiiformes Family: Ciconiidae

Storks are large, long-legged, long-necked, wading birds with long, stout bills. Storks are mute, but bill-clattering is an important mode of communication at the nest. Their nests can be large and may be reused for many years. Many species are migratory.

- White stork, Ciconia ciconia (A)

== Frigatebirds ==
Order: Suliformes Family: Fregatidae

Frigatebirds are large seabirds usually found over tropical oceans. They are large, black-and-white or completely black, with long wings and deeply forked tails. The males have coloured inflatable throat pouches. They do not swim or walk and cannot take off from a flat surface. Having the largest wingspan-to-body-weight ratio of any bird, they are essentially aerial, able to stay aloft for more than a week.

- Lesser frigatebird, Fregata ariel
- Great frigatebird, Fregata minor

== Boobies and gannets ==
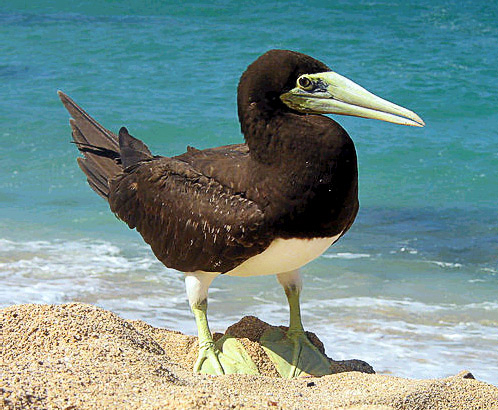
Brown booby

Order: Suliformes Family: Sulidae

The sulids comprise the gannets and boobies. Both groups are medium to large coastal seabirds that plunge-dive for fish.

- Masked booby, Sula dactylatra
- Brown booby, Sula leucogaster
- Red-footed booby, Sula sula
- Abbott's booby, Sula abbotti (Ex)

== Cormorants and shags ==
Order: Suliformes Family: Phalacrocoracidae

Phalacrocoracidae is a family of medium to large coastal, fish-eating seabirds that includes cormorants and shags. Plumage colouration varies, with the majority having mainly dark plumage, some species being black-and-white and a few being colourful.

- Long-tailed cormorant, Microcarbo africanus (A)
- Great cormorant, Phalacrocorax carbo (A)

== Pelicans ==
Order: Pelecaniformes Family: Pelecanidae

Pelicans are large water birds with a distinctive pouch under their beak. As with other members of the order Pelecaniformes, they have webbed feet with four toes.

- Pink-backed pelican, Pelecanus rufescens (Ex)

== Herons, egrets, and bitterns ==
Order: Pelecaniformes Family: Ardeidae

The family Ardeidae contains the bitterns, herons and egrets. Herons and egrets are medium to large wading birds with long necks and legs. Bitterns tend to be shorter necked and more wary. Members of Ardeidae fly with their necks retracted, unlike other long-necked birds such as storks, ibises and spoonbills.

- Great bittern, Botaurus stellaris (A)
- Yellow bittern, Ixobrychus sinensis
- Little bittern, Ixobrychus minutus (A)
- Cinnamon bittern, Ixobrychus cinnamomeus (A)
- Grey heron, Ardea cinerea
- Purple heron, Ardea purpurea (A)
- Great egret, Ardea alba (A)
- Intermediate egret, Ardea intermedia (A)
- Little egret, Egretta garzetta (A)
- Cattle egret, Bubulcus ibis
- Squacco heron, Ardeola ralloides (A)
- Indian pond-heron, Ardeola grayii (A)
- Malagasy pond-heron, Ardeola idae
- Little heron, Butorides atricapilla
- Black-crowned night-heron, Nycticorax nycticorax

== Ibises and spoonbills ==
Order: Pelecaniformes Family: Threskiornithidae

Threskiornithidae is a family of large terrestrial and wading birds which includes the ibises and spoonbills. They have long, broad wings with 11 primary and about 20 secondary feathers. They are strong fliers and despite their size and weight, very capable soarers.

- Glossy ibis, Plegadis falcinellus (A)
- African sacred ibis, Threskiornis aethiopicus (A)
- Malagasy sacred ibis, Threskiornis bernieri
- Eurasian spoonbill, Platalea leucorodia (A)
- African spoonbill, Platalea alba (A)

== Osprey ==
Order: Accipitriformes Family: Pandionidae

The family Pandionidae contains only one species, the osprey. The osprey is a medium-large raptor which is a specialist fish-eater with a worldwide distribution.

- Osprey, Pandion haliaetus (A)

== Hawks, eagles, and kites ==
Order: Accipitriformes Family: Accipitridae

Accipitridae is a family of birds of prey, which includes hawks, eagles, kites, harriers and Old World vultures. These birds have powerful hooked beaks for tearing flesh from their prey, strong legs, powerful talons and keen eyesight.

- European honey-buzzard, Pernis apivorus (A)
- Oriental honey-buzzard, Pernis ptilorhynchus (A)
- Booted eagle, Hieraaetus pennatus (A)
- Eurasian marsh-harrier, Circus aeruginosus (A)
- Malagasy harrier, Circus macrosceles (A)
- Pallid harrier, Circus macrourus (A)
- Black kite, Milvus migrans (A)

== Barn-owls ==
Order: Strigiformes Family: Tytonidae

Barn-owls are medium to large owls with large heads and characteristic heart-shaped faces. They have long strong legs with powerful talons.

- Western barn owl, Tyto alba (I)

== Owls ==
Order: Strigiformes Family: Strigidae

The typical owls are small to large solitary nocturnal birds of prey. They have large forward-facing eyes and ears, a hawk-like beak and a conspicuous circle of feathers around each eye called a facial disk.

- Eurasian scops-owl, Otus scops (A)
- Seychelles scops-owl, Otus insularis (E)
- Brown fish-owl, Ketupa zeylonensis (A)

== Hoopoes ==
Order: Bucerotiformes Family: Upupidae

Hoopoes have black, white and orangey-pink colouring with a large erectile crest on their head.

- Eurasian hoopoe, Upupa epops (A)

== Kingfishers ==
Order: Coraciiformes Family: Alcedinidae

Kingfishers are medium-sized birds with large heads, long, pointed bills, short legs and stubby tails.

- Malagasy kingfisher, Corythornis vintsioides (A)
- Grey-headed kingfisher, Halcyon leucocephala (A)

== Bee-eaters ==
Order: Coraciiformes Family: Meropidae

The bee-eaters are a group of near passerine birds in the family Meropidae. Most species are found in Africa but others occur in southern Europe, Madagascar, Australia and New Guinea. They are characterised by richly coloured plumage, slender bodies and usually elongated central tail feathers. All are colourful and have long downturned bills and pointed wings, which give them a swallow-like appearance when seen from afar.

- Blue-cheeked bee-eater, Merops persicus (A)
- Madagascar bee-eater, Merops superciliosus (A)
- European bee-eater, Merops apiaster (A)

== Rollers ==
Order: Coraciiformes Family: Coraciidae

Rollers resemble crows in size and build, but are more closely related to the kingfishers and bee-eaters. They share the colourful appearance of those groups with blues and browns predominating. The two inner front toes are connected, but the outer toe is not.

- European roller, Coracias garrulus (A)
- Broad-billed roller, Eurystomus glaucurus (A)

== Falcons and caracaras ==
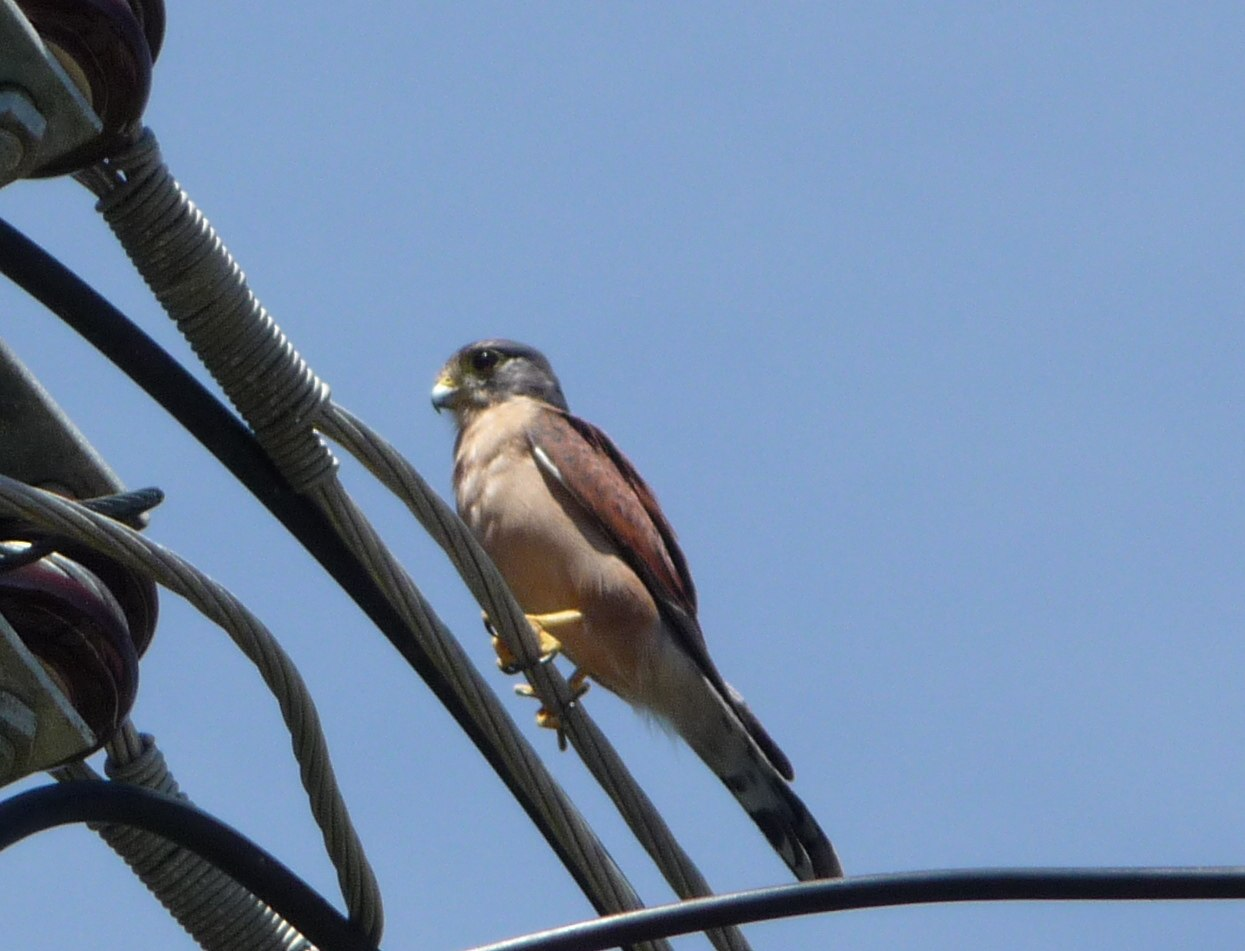
Seychelles kestrel

Order: Falconiformes Family: Falconidae

Falconidae is a family of diurnal birds of prey. They differ from hawks, eagles and kites in that they kill with their beaks instead of their talons.

- Lesser kestrel, Falco naumanni (A)
- Eurasian kestrel, Falco tinnunculus (A)
- Malagasy kestrel, Falco newtoni
- Seychelles kestrel, Falco araea (E)
- Red-footed falcon, Falco vespertinus (A)
- Amur falcon, Falco amurensis
- Eleonora's falcon, Falco eleonorae (A)
- Sooty falcon, Falco concolor (A)
- Eurasian hobby, Falco subbuteo (A)
- Saker falcon, Falco cherrug (A)
- Peregrine falcon, Falco peregrinus (A)

== Old World parrots ==
Black parrot, Coracopsis barklyi

Order: Psittaciformes Family: Psittaculidae

Characteristic features of parrots include a strong curved bill, an upright stance, strong legs, and clawed zygodactyl feet. Many parrots are vividly colored, and some are multi-colored. In size they range from 8 cm (3.1 in) to 1 m (3.3 ft) in length. Old World parrots are found from Africa east across south and southeast Asia and Oceania to Australia and New Zealand. Rose-ringed parakeet was introduced in 1974. An eradication campaign began in 2014 and was successful by 2016.

- Seychelles black parrot, Coracopsis barklyi (E)
- Seychelles parakeet, Psittacula wardi (E, Extinct)
- Rose-ringed parakeet, Psittacula krameri (I, Ex)
- Grey-headed lovebird, Agapornis canus (I, Ex)

== Old World orioles ==
Order: Passeriformes Family: Oriolidae

The Old World orioles are colourful passerine birds. They are not related to the New World orioles.

- Eurasian golden oriole, Oriolus oriolus (A)

== Vangas, helmetshrikes, and allies ==
Order: Passeriformes Family: Vangidae

The helmetshrikes are similar in build to the shrikes, but tend to be colourful species with distinctive crests or other head ornaments, such as wattles, from which they get their name.

- Rufous vanga, Schetba rufa (A)

== Drongos ==
Order: Passeriformes Family: Dicruridae

The drongos are mostly black or dark grey in colour, sometimes with metallic tints. They have long forked tails, and some Asian species have elaborate tail decorations. They have short legs and sit very upright when perched, like a shrike. They flycatch or take prey from the ground.

- Aldabra drongo, Dicrurus aldabranus (E)

== Monarch flycatchers ==
Order: Passeriformes Family: Monarchidae

The monarch flycatchers are small to medium-sized insectivorous passerines which hunt by flycatching.

- Seychelles paradise-flycatcher, Terpsiphone corvina (E)

== Shrikes ==
Order: Passeriformes Family: Laniidae

Shrikes are passerine birds known for their habit of catching other birds and small animals and impaling the uneaten portions of their bodies on thorns. A typical shrike's beak is hooked, like a bird of prey.

- Red-backed shrike, Lanius collurio (A)
- Lesser grey shrike, Lanius minor (A)
- Woodchat shrike, Lanius senator (A)

== Crows, jays, and magpies ==
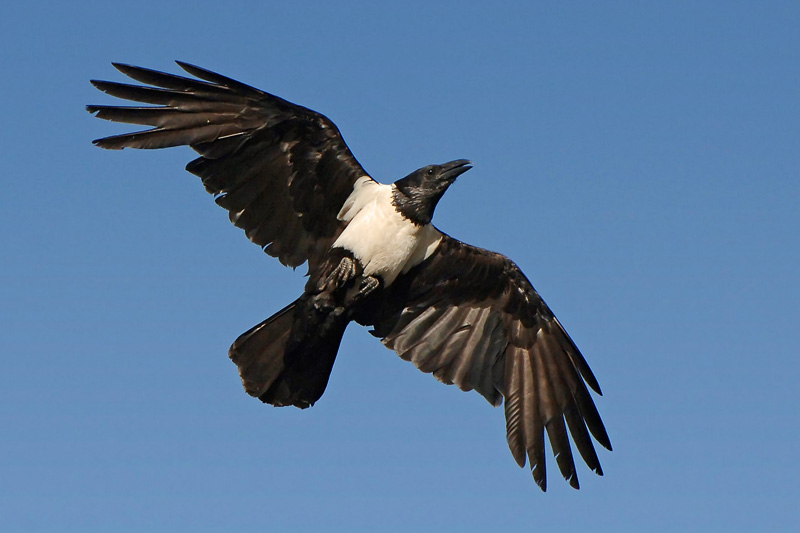
The pied crow is a resident of Aldabra

Order: Passeriformes Family: Corvidae

The family Corvidae includes crows, ravens, jays, choughs, magpies, treepies, nutcrackers and ground jays. Corvids are above average in size among the Passeriformes, and some of the larger species show high levels of intelligence. House crow was ship-assisted to Seychelles and began to breed in the 1970s; it was eradicated in 1994. Since then there have been no breeding records, but birds continue to arrive on occasion and eradication is ongoing.

- House crow, Corvus splendens (I, Ex)
- Pied crow, Corvus albus

== Larks ==
Order: Passeriformes Family: Alaudidae

Larks are small terrestrial birds with often extravagant songs and display flights. Most larks are fairly dull in appearance. Their food is insects and seeds.

- Greater short-toed lark, Calandrella brachydactyla (A)
- Bimaculated lark, Melanocorypha bimaculata (A)

== Cisticolas and allies ==
Order: Passeriformes Family: Cisticolidae

The Cisticolidae are warblers found mainly in warmer southern regions of the Old World. They are generally very small birds of drab brown or grey appearance found in open country such as grassland or scrub.

- Madagascar cisticola, Cisticola cherina

== Reed warblers and allies ==
Order: Passeriformes Family: Acrocephalidae

The members of this family are usually rather large for "warblers". Most are rather plain olivaceous brown above with much yellow to beige below. They are usually found in open woodland, reedbeds, or tall grass. The family occurs mostly in southern to western Eurasia and surroundings, but it also ranges far into the Pacific, with some species in Africa.

- Aldabra brush-warbler, Nesillas aldabrana (E, Extinct)
- Icterine warbler, Hippolais icterina (A)
- Sedge warbler, Acrocephalus schoenobaenus (A)
- Marsh warbler, Hippolais palustris (A)
- Eurasian reed warbler, Acrocephalus scirpaceus (A)
- Seychelles warbler, Acrocephalus sechellensis (E)

== Swallows ==
Order: Passeriformes Family: Hirundinidae

The family Hirundinidae is adapted to aerial feeding. They have a slender streamlined body, long pointed wings and a short bill with a wide gape. The feet are adapted to perching rather than walking, and the front toes are partially joined at the base.

- Plain martin, Riparia riparia (A)
- Bank swallow, Riparia riparia (A)
- Mascarene martin, Phedina borbonica (A)
- Barn swallow, Hirundo rustica
- Wire-tailed swallow, Hirundo smithii (A)
- Common house-martin, Delichon urbicum (A)

== Bulbuls ==
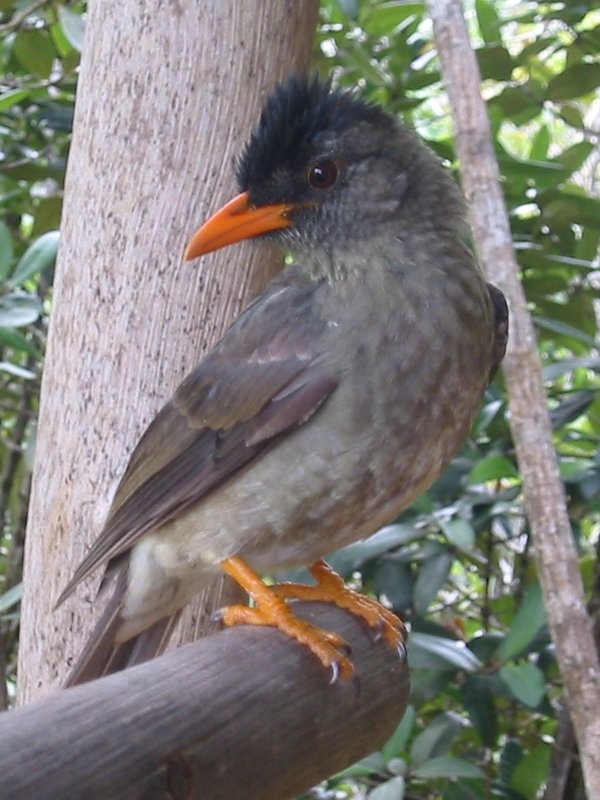
The Seychelles bulbul is common across the Seychelles.

Order: Passeriformes Family: Pycnonotidae

Bulbuls are medium-sized songbirds. Some are colourful with yellow, red or orange vents, cheeks, throats or supercilia, but most are drab, with uniform olive-brown to black plumage. Some species have distinct crests. Red-whiskered bulbul, introduced in 1970s, occurred only at Assumption and was eradicated from there in 2014 to maintain introduced bird-free status of nearby Aldabra (birds, discovered at Aldabra were culled in 2013 before they established a population).

- Red-whiskered Bulbul, Pycnonotus jocosus (I, Ex)
- Malagasy bulbul, Hypsipetes madagascariensis
- Seychelles bulbul, Hypsipetes crassirostris (E)

== Leaf warblers ==
Order: Passeriformes Family: Phylloscopidae

Leaf warblers are a family of small insectivorous birds found mostly in Eurasia and ranging into Wallacea and Africa. The species are of various sizes, often green-plumaged above and yellow below, or more subdued with greyish-green to greyish-brown colors.

- Wood warbler, Phylloscopus sibilatrix (A)
- Willow warbler, Phylloscopus trochilus (A)
- Common chiffchaff, Phylloscopus collybita (A)

== Sylviid warblers, parrotbills, and allies ==
Order: Passeriformes Family: Sylviidae

The family Sylviidae is a group of small insectivorous passerine birds. They mainly occur as breeding species, as the common name implies, in Europe, Asia and, to a lesser extent, Africa. Most are of generally undistinguished appearance, but many have distinctive songs.

- Eurasian blackcap, Sylvia atricapilla (A)
- Garden warbler, Sylvia borin (A)
- Greater whitethroat, Curruca communis (A)

== White-eyes, yuhinas, and allies ==
Order: Passeriformes Family: Zosteropidae

The white-eyes are small and mostly undistinguished, their plumage above being generally some dull colour like greenish-olive, but some species have a white or bright yellow throat, breast or lower parts, and several have buff flanks. As their name suggests, many species have a white ring around each eye.

- Marianne white-eye, Zosterops semiflavus (E, Extinct)
- Seychelles white-eye, Zosterops modestus (E)
- Malagasy white-eye, Zosterops maderaspatanus
- Aldabra white-eye, Zosterops aldabrensis (E)

== Starlings ==
Order: Passeriformes Family: Sturnidae

Starlings are small to medium-sized passerine birds. Their flight is strong and direct and they are very gregarious. Their preferred habitat is fairly open country. They eat insects and fruit. Plumage is typically dark with a metallic sheen.

- Wattled starling, Creatophora cinerea (A)
- Rosy starling, Pastor roseus (A)
- Common myna, Acridotheres tristis (I)

== Old World flycatchers ==
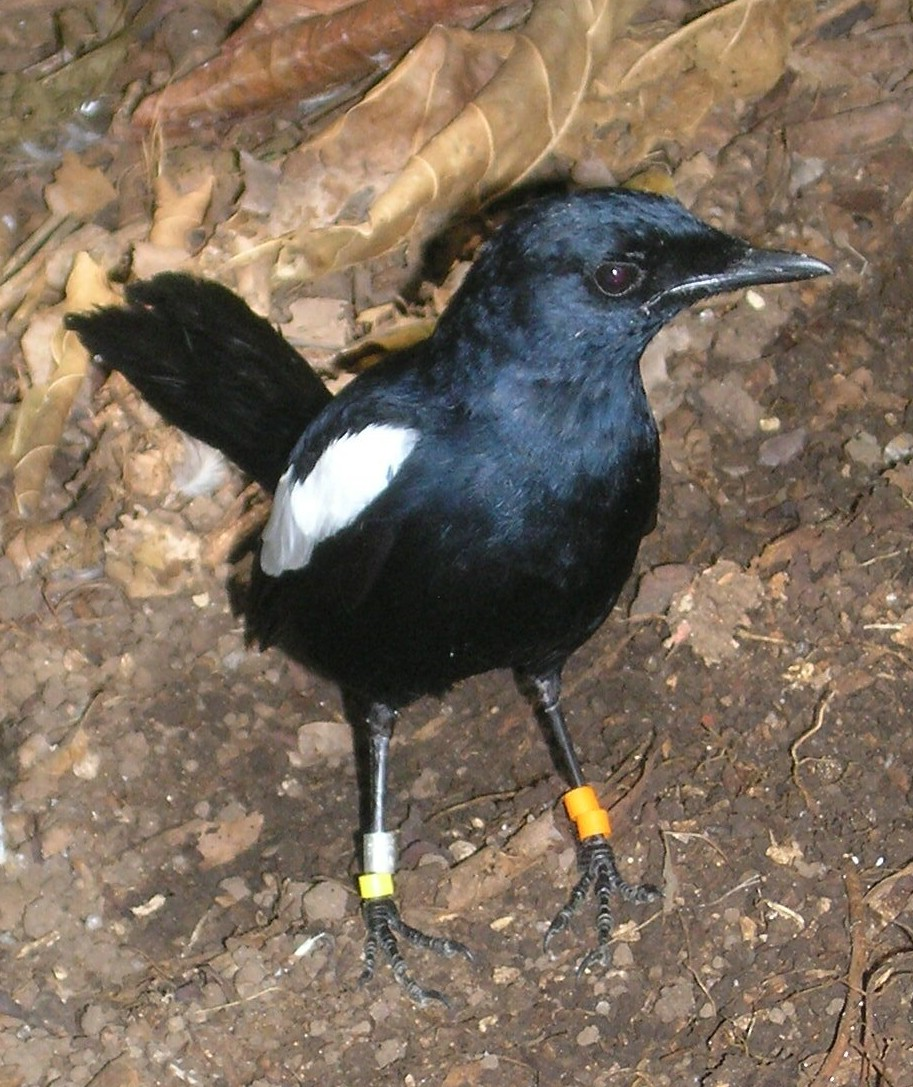
Seychelles magpie-robin

Order: Passeriformes Family: Muscicapidae

Old World flycatchers are a large group of small passerine birds native to the Old World. They are mainly small arboreal insectivores. The appearance of these birds is highly varied, but they mostly have weak songs and harsh calls.

- Spotted flycatcher, Muscicapa striata (A)
- Rufous-tailed scrub-robin, Cercotrichas galactotes (A)
- Seychelles magpie-robin, Copsychus sechellarum (E)
- Common redstart, Phoenicurus phoenicurus (A)
- Rufous-tailed rock-thrush, Monticola saxatilis (A)
- Whinchat, Saxicola rubetra (A)
- Siberian stonechat, Saxicola maurus (A)
- Northern wheatear, Oenanthe oenanthe (A)
- Isabelline wheatear, Oenanthe isabellina (A)
- Desert wheatear, Oenanthe deserti (A)
- Pied wheatear, Oenanthe pleschanka (A)

== Sunbirds and spiderhunters ==
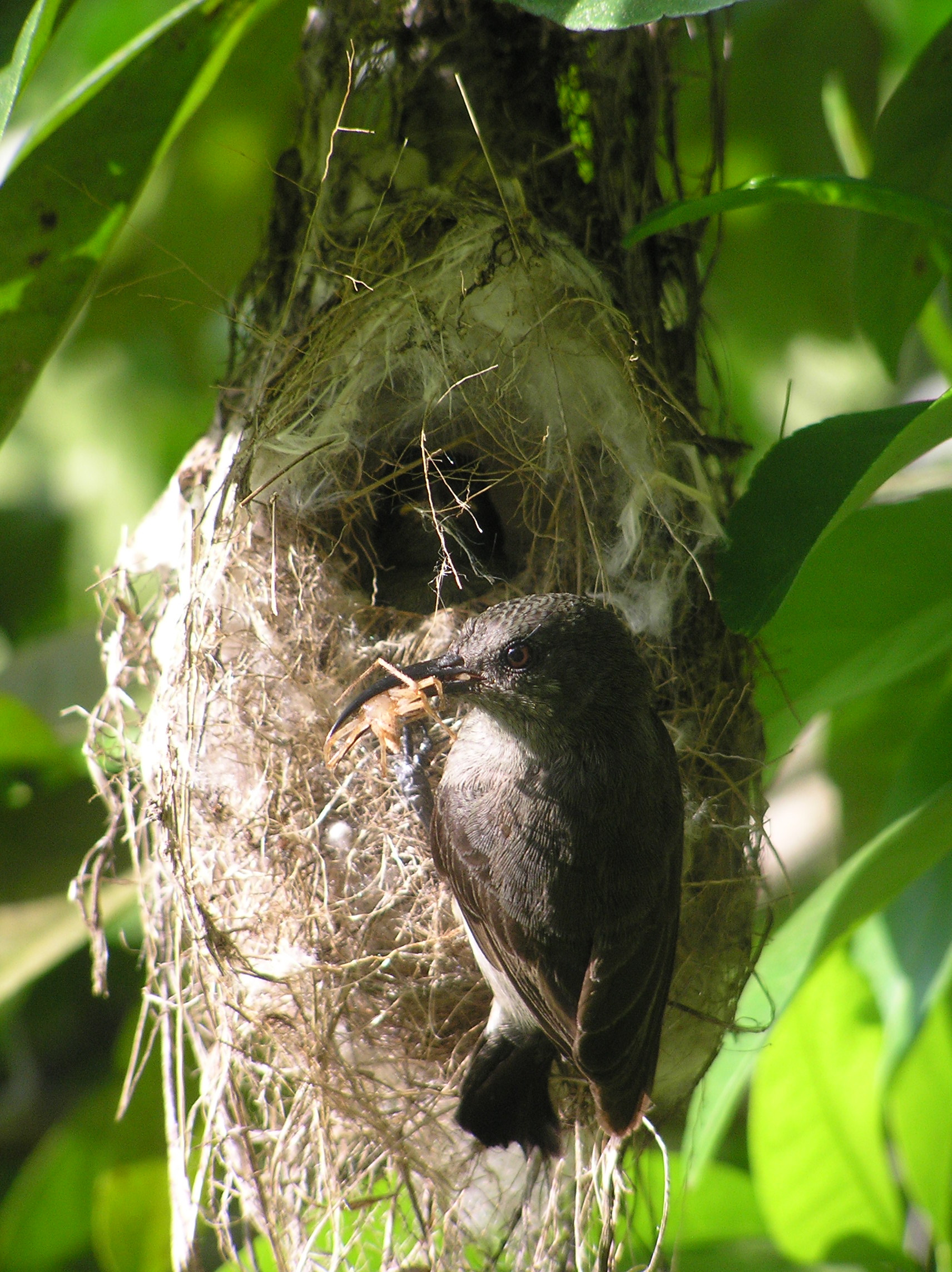
Female Seychelles sunbird feeding young.

Order: Passeriformes Family: Nectariniidae

The sunbirds and spiderhunters are very small passerine birds which feed largely on nectar, although they will also take insects, especially when feeding young. Flight is fast and direct on their short wings. Most species can take nectar by hovering like a hummingbird, but usually perch to feed.

- Souimanga sunbird, Cinnyris sovimanga
- Seychelles sunbird, Cinnyris dussumieri (E)

== Weavers and allies ==
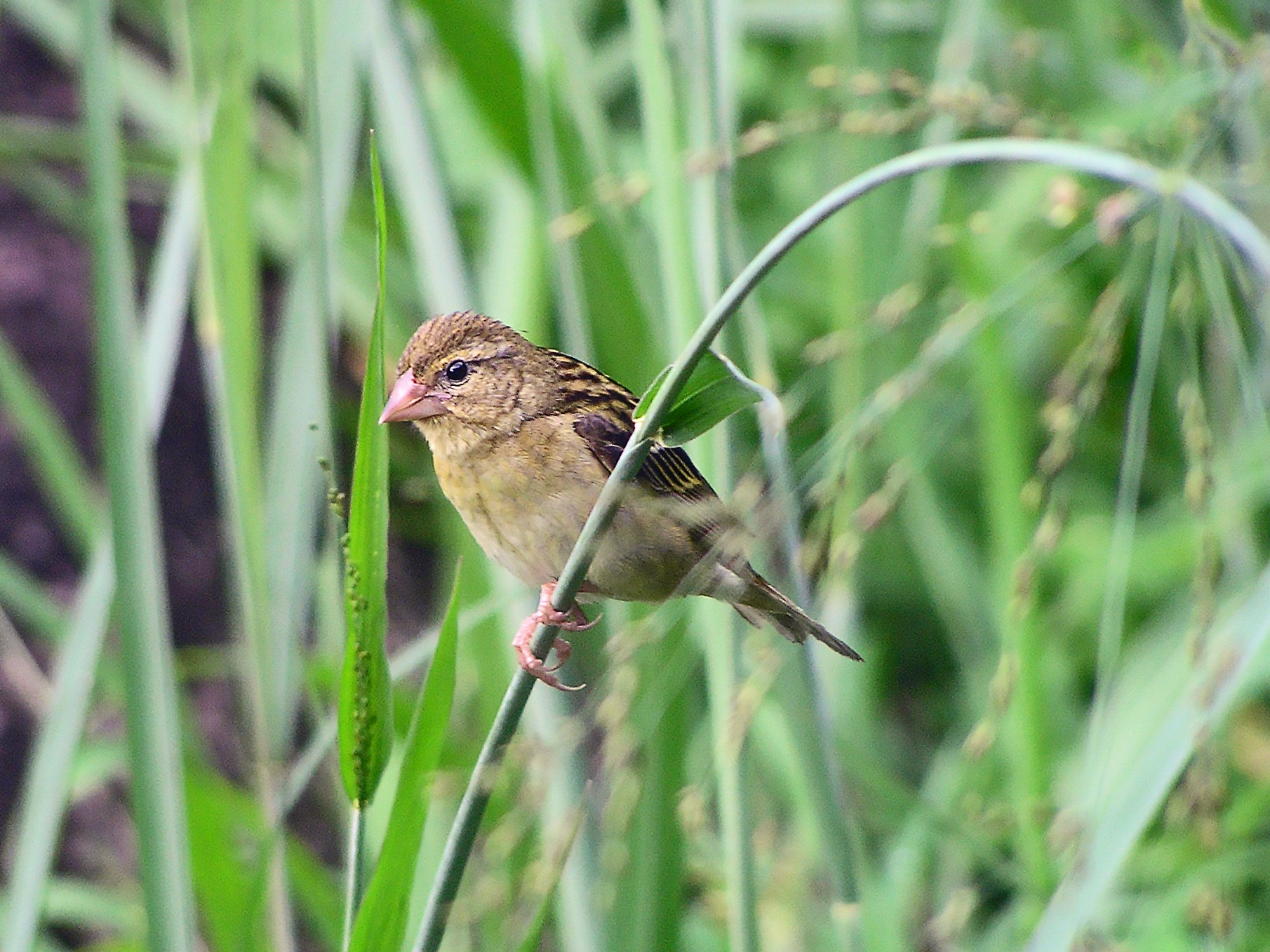
Female red fody

Order: Passeriformes Family: Ploceidae

The weavers are small passerine birds related to the finches. They are seed-eating birds with rounded conical bills. The males of many species are brightly coloured, usually in red or yellow and black, some species show variation in colour only in the breeding season. The status of the red fody in the Seychelles is uncertain, it was possibly introduced or may have been an uncommon resident prior to human arrival.

- Red fody, Foudia madagascariensis (I)
- Aldabra fody, Foudia aldabrana (E)
- Seychelles fody, Foudia sechellarum (E)

== Waxbills and allies ==
Order: Passeriformes Family: Estrildidae

The estrildid finches are small passerine birds of the Old World tropics and Australasia. They are gregarious and often colonial seed eaters with short thick but pointed bills. They are all similar in structure and habits, but have wide variation in plumage colours and patterns.

- Common waxbill, Estrilda astrild (I)

== Old World sparrows ==
Order: Passeriformes Family: Passeridae

Old World sparrows are small passerine birds. In general, sparrows tend to be small, plump, brown or grey birds with short tails and short powerful beaks. Sparrows are seed eaters, but they also consume small insects.

- House sparrow, Passer domesticus (I)

== Wagtails and pipits ==
Order: Passeriformes Family: Motacillidae

Motacillidae is a family of small passerine birds with medium to long tails. They include the wagtails, longclaws and pipits. They are slender, ground feeding insectivores of open country.

- Grey wagtail, Motacilla cinerea (A)
- Western yellow wagtail, Motacilla flava (A)
- Citrine wagtail, Motacilla citreola (A)
- White wagtail, Motacilla alba (A)
- Richard's pipit, Anthus richardi (A)
- Tree pipit, Anthus trivialis
- Red-throated pipit, Anthus cervinus (A)

== Finches, euphonias, and allies ==
Order: Passeriformes Family: Fringillidae

Finches are seed-eating passerine birds, that are small to moderately large and have a strong beak, usually conical and in some species very large. All have twelve tail feathers and nine primaries. These birds have a bouncing flight with alternating bouts of flapping and gliding on closed wings, and most sing well. Yellow-fronted canary was introduced to Assumption in April 1977 and became established on the island. However, birds died out for unknown reasons around 2000.

- Common rosefinch, Carpodacus erythrinus (A)
- Yellow-fronted canary, Crithagra mozambicus (I, Ex)

== Old World buntings ==
Order: Passeriformes Family: Emberizidae

The emberizids are a large family of passerine birds. They are seed-eating birds with distinctively shaped bills. Many emberizid species have distinctive head patterns.

- Black-headed bunting, Emberiza melanocephala (A)
- Ortolan bunting, Emberiza hortulana (A)

== See also ==
- List of birds
- Lists of birds by region
