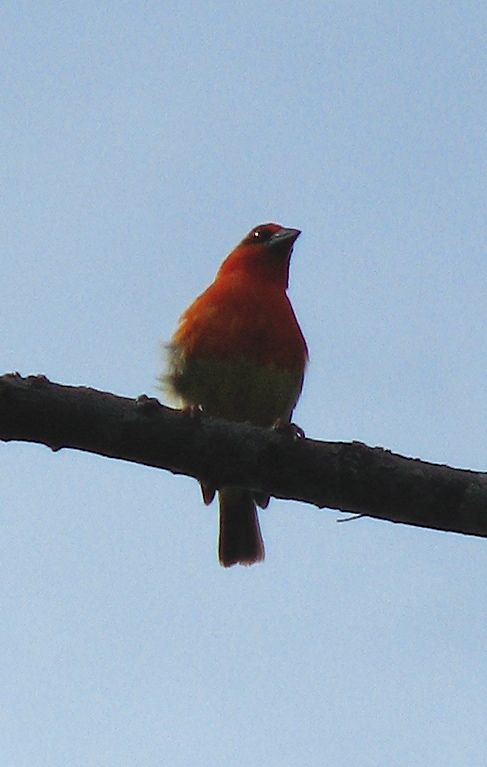

Conservation status
- Endangered (IUCN 3.1)

Scientific classification
- Kingdom: Animalia
- Phylum: Chordata
- Class: Aves
- Order: Passeriformes
- Family: Ploceidae
- Genus: Foudia
- Species: F. aldabrana

Binomial name
- Foudia aldabrana Ridgway, 1893

Synonyms
- Neshyphantes aldabranus Shelley, 1896; Foudia eminentissima aldabrana

= Aldabra fody =

Species of bird

The Aldabra fody (Foudia aldabrana) is a passerine bird in the family Ploceidae. It is endemic to Aldabra, an atoll northwest of Madagascar, part of Seychelles. Regarded as conspecific with the Comoros fody in the past, it is now recognized as a distinct species by the International Union for the Conservation of Nature (IUCN). Both sexes are yellow in color across much of the body, with breeding males orange-scarlet on the head and neck. The species has a large and powerful bill, used to compete with other birds of Aldabra for food. Nesting occurs over several months, often in introduced coconut palms and Casuarina trees. The Aldabra fody is considered endangered by the IUCN, threatened by predation of nests and drought. Hybridization with the related Madagascar fody has occurred in the past, but is not currently considered a danger to the species.

== Taxonomy ==
The Aldabra fody was described as Foudia aldabrana by Robert Ridgway in 1893, based on several specimens, both male and female, at the American Museum of Natural History. The specimens had been collected by William Louis Abbott from Aldabra Island the previous year. Ridgway commented on their similarity to Foudia madagascariensis, while noting that F. aldabrana was much larger. The species has since been synonymized with F. eminentissima, the Cormoros fody, by some researchers, and was once treated as such by the International Union for the Conservation of Nature (IUCN). However, following the reaffirmation of F. aldabrana as distinct from F. eminentissima by multiple authors in the 2010s, the IUCN began assessing the Aldabra fody as a separate species on its Red List of Threatened Species. F. aldabrana is nested within a clade that includes F. madagascariensis and F. omissa. The species is monotypic.

The Aldabra fody has been known to hybridize with its relative the Madagascar fody, an invasive species on Aldabra. The Madagascar fody is thought to have reached Aldabra by way of Assumption Island, where they were introduced in 1977 for aesthetic purposes. An eradication program reduced the population on Assumption over 99% by 2015, and similar efforts have begun on Aldabra. A 2015 study found no indication of hybridization between the two species prior to human contact, stating that the birds most likely colonized the island before the start of the eradication program on Assumption. Hybridization between the species has occurred in a region known as Takamaka in the eastern part of the atoll, and the results of the study suggested that the invasive birds had not yet reached other areas. The majority of crosses appeared to have been between male Aldabra fodies and female Madagascar fodies, producing offspring intermediate between their parents in size.

== Description ==
The Aldabra fody's bill is markedly long and heavy, a distinctive characteristic. The female is similar to a sparrow, but more yellow, with dark streaks and a more powerful bill. The breeding plumage of the male is orange-scarlet on the head and breast, with yellow on the back and body, sides and flanks imbued with olive-gray, a sulfur-yellow belly, yellowish white tips on the median covert feathers, and an orange rump. An article published in the Bulletin of the African Bird Club, a conservationist journal, described the males of the species as the "most attractive of all fodies". Immature birds are similar to the female. All plumages contain yellow tones, and all are more yellow than the related Comoros and Madagascar fodies, especially on the underparts.

=== Voice ===
There were no published recordings of the Aldabra fody's vocalizations as of 2013, but they have been well-described. There are a great variety, with many based on high-pitched and metallic two-eet, twee, or tee calls. They produce a trilling song sequence consisting of a variety of notes, described by one study as tsee-oo tsee-oo tsee-oo fsssssss looklooklooklooklook. Males generate a nasal "fizzing" noise associated with territorial defense, suggested by one ornithological encyclopedia to correspond to the fsssssss noise reported in the study. Birds advertise their territory with clear and loud tweet tweet two-eet, or simply tweet or two-eet notes. They may also produce three rapid, lower notes followed by two or three higher notes with more deliberation: teetiti twee twee. Males and females have different alarm sounds, with males trilling excitedly while females scold loudly and continuously (tic-tic tzip tic tzip tzip tic-tic). Females give a zeep zeep when soliciting copulation, with a psep pseep after mating.

== Distribution and habitat ==
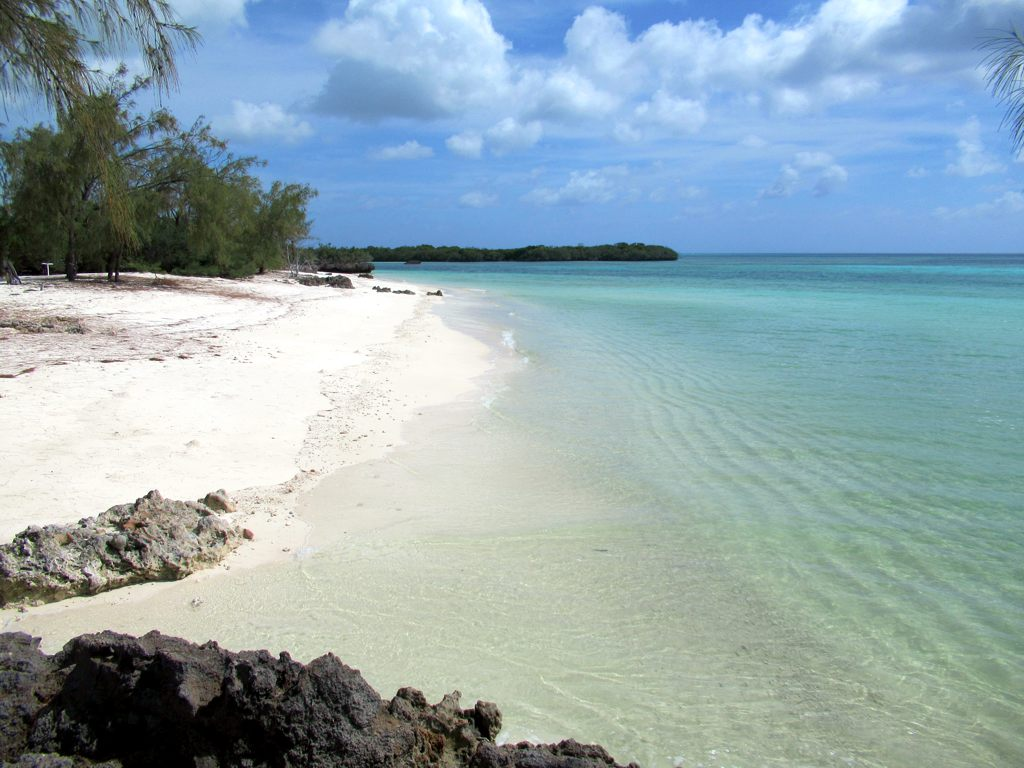
The Aldabra fody is endemic to Aldabra (coast pictured), an atoll in Seychelles.

The Aldabra fody is endemic to Aldabra, an atoll located about 400 kilometres (250 mi) northwest of Madagascar, belonging to Seychelles. The species is widespread on Aldabra, found on all main islands, as well as smaller islets of the lagoon. The atoll, which makes up one third of the total land of Seychelles, is protected by the government as a nature reserve. "Cardinals" reported on Astove and possibly Cosmoledo in the 19th century may have been the Aldabra fody, but there is no proof of this.

The Aldabra fody can be found in scrub, Cocos nucifera groves, or Casuarina woodland. Their territories may be as little as 840 square metres (1,000 yd^{2}) in groves of large trees, which could indicate a possible forest ancestry, although there are no forests on Aldabra.

== Behavior and ecology ==
=== Reproduction ===
Adult males spend most of the year defending and maintaining nesting territories. They are strongly territorial, with a characteristic threat display consisting of drooping the wings and tail while puffing out the feathers of the head, breast, and rump. Intruders are challenged with a variety of calls; this may occur with a female, but upon recognition, the calls become a series of high whistles, uttered by one or both. The male then raises its wings above its back, and, if accepted, mounts and copulates with the female, wings remaining raised. Copulation has been observed in November and December.

Nesting has been reported in November, December, and January, probably extending to February or March. The birds prefer to nest in coconut palms and Casuarina trees, neither of which are native to Aldabra. This may be a response to predation by the introduced Rattus rattus. Nests are large, open on the side, and partially domed. They are made of small twigs, weed stems, and coarse grasses, lined with finer grasses. The eggs, which are laid in clutches variously reported as containing 2–4 eggs, are pale glaucous green (approaching blue), unspotted, and elongate ovate in shape, with thin, glossy shells. In size, they are 2.05 centimetres (0.81 in) × 1.4 centimetres (0.55 in) on average.

=== Diet ===
The Aldabra fody consumes seeds (including those of Casuarina trees), flowers, and beetles, which are collected from bushes, trees, and the ground. They may also take other small invertebrates. They also consume nectar, and their tongue is somewhat adapted for this purpose. Rice and kitchen scraps are taken near human settlement, while unripe maize is eaten only when already opened by rats. Due to the strength of their bills, this may be due to unfamiliarity. The large bill may be a product of adaptive radiation, designed to compete with other land-dwelling birds of the atoll by exploiting all available sources of food.

== Conservation ==
The Aldabra fody's nesting success may be very low due to the rate at which nestlings and eggs are taken by predators such as the pied crow and black rat. Increasing drought conditions on the atoll are impacting the birds' habitat. Hybridization with the Madagascar fody has been cited as a threat to the Aldabra fody's genetic integrity, although the IUCN has stated that successful effort to eradicate hybrid fodies means that hybridization is not currently causing a decline in the overall Aldabra fody population. The organization has designated the species as endangered.
