= Réunion fody =

Conservation status
- Extinct (shortly after 1672) (IUCN 3.1)

Scientific classification
- Kingdom: Animalia
- Phylum: Chordata
- Class: Aves
- Order: Passeriformes
- Family: Ploceidae
- Genus: Foudia
- Species: †F. delloni

Binomial name
- †Foudia delloni Cheke & Hume, 2008

Extinct species of bird

The Réunion fody (Foudia delloni) is an extinct bird species from the family of weavers. It was endemic to the Mascarene island of Réunion.

== Taxonomy ==
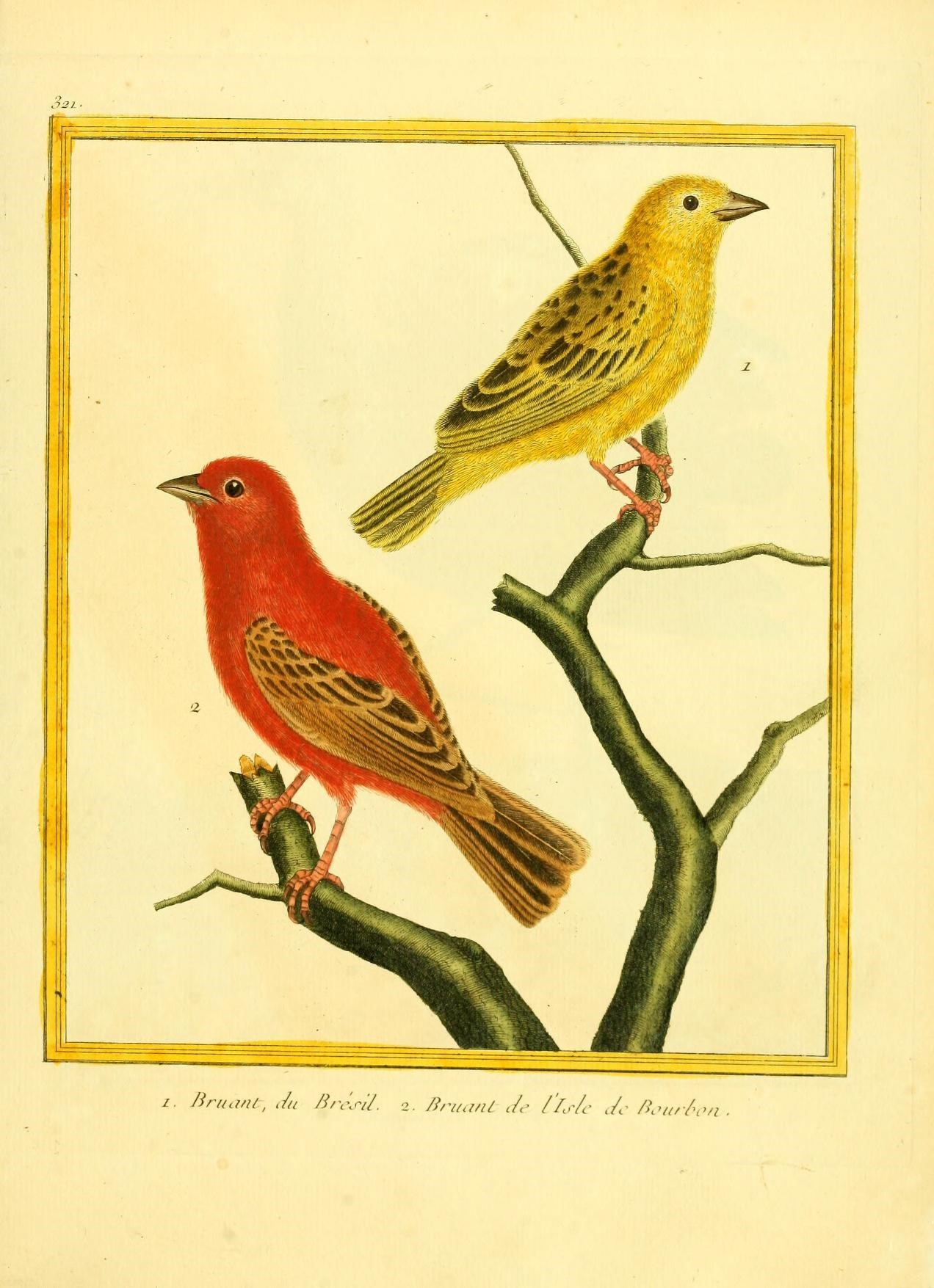
1765 plate showing Foudia bruante (below) which was once thought to be this species, but may instead be a colour morph of the introduced red fody.

This bird was first mentioned in a report by traveller Gabriel Dellon and a second time in 1674 by Dubois. The species, of which no museum specimens exist, was formally described as a new species by Anthony Cheke and Julian Pender Hume in their book Lost Land of the Dodo in 2008.

A type of fody on Réunion was previously mentioned as Foudia bruante by Philipp Ludwig Statius Müller in the work Planches Enluminées in 1776. But after a hypothesis by Cheke and Hume, Foudia bruante might be just a colour morph of the red fody, which was introduced to Réunion about 100 years after the discovery of Foudia delloni.

== Description ==
The Réunion fody reached roughly the size of a house sparrow. The head, neck, throat and the wing underparts of the breeding male were bright red. Back and tail were brown. The belly was pale. The head of the females and the juvenile males was brown. Neck and wings were red. The throat was pale brown.

Delloni's 1685 description reads as follows:

While the sparrows are no larger in Mascareigne [Réunion] than in other countries, their numbers render them inconvenient. They strip sown fields and the houses are full of them, as ours are with flies. One often sees them fall into pots and platters, and burning their wings on fires, which are lit out of doors, the sun providing enough heat for [even] the coolest houses.

== Extinction ==
The Réunion fody was once described as abundant and as a pest that destroyed entire crops. It was last seen shortly after 1672. The reason for its extinction might be predation by rats.

Dubois described its damage to crops as follows in 1671–72:

There are, besides, in the Isle a quantity of other birds, which wou'd take too long to describe, contenting myself with naming the principal, & particularly the sparrows, which here are so thick, and in such numbers that they bring great damage to the island, eating a large part of the cereal that is planted, without it being possible to destroy them because there are too many. Several cereal harvests would be made during the year if it were not for these sparrows, because of which one is restricted to a single harvest, in the period they go nesting in the mountains. These sparrows have plumage like those in Europe, except that the males, when breeding, have the throat, head and top of the wings the colour of fire. All the birds of the Island have each their season at different times, being six months in the flat country & six months in the mountains, from whence returning they are very fat and good to eat.
