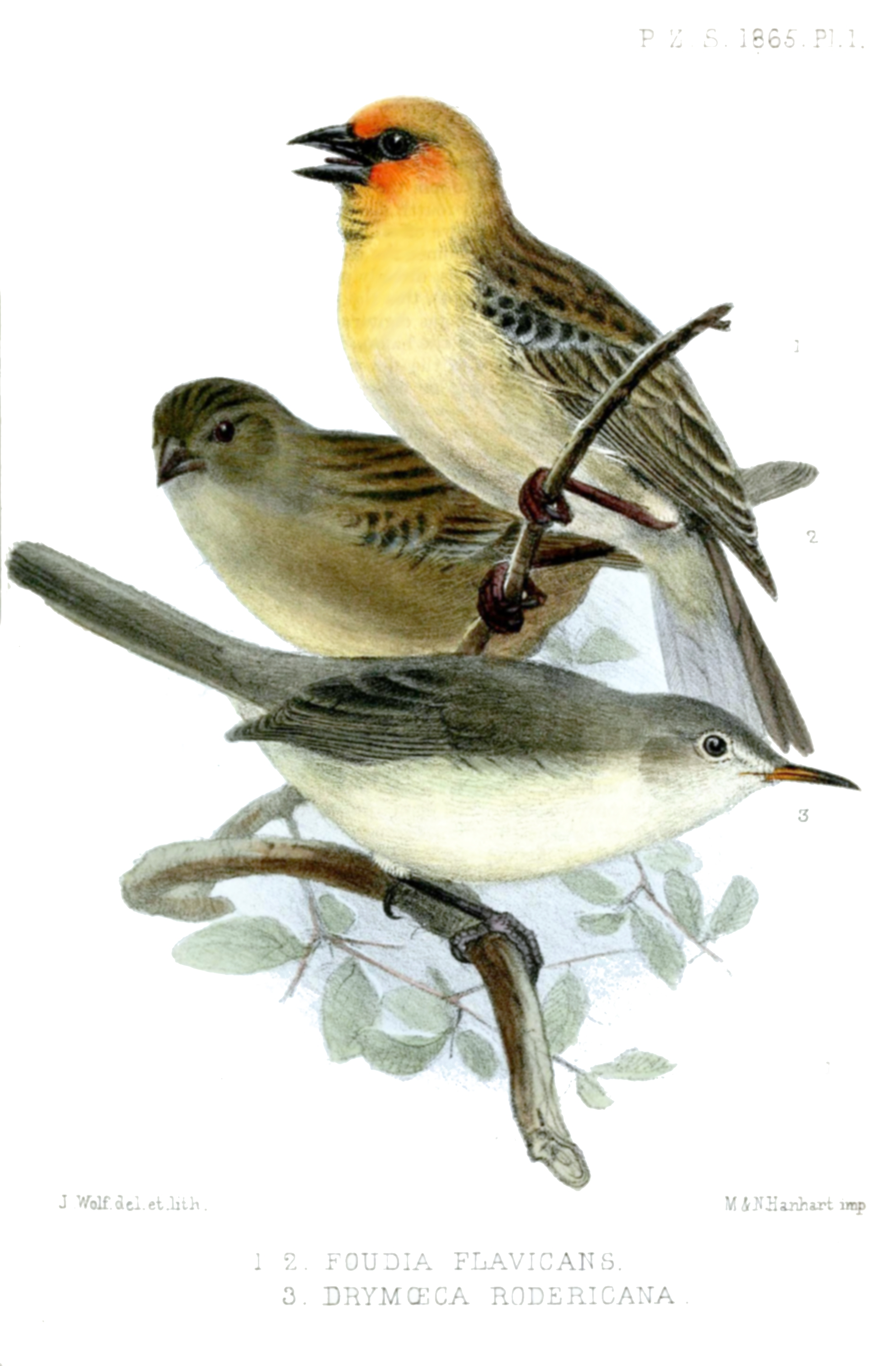
- Illustrations by Joseph Wolf (1864)
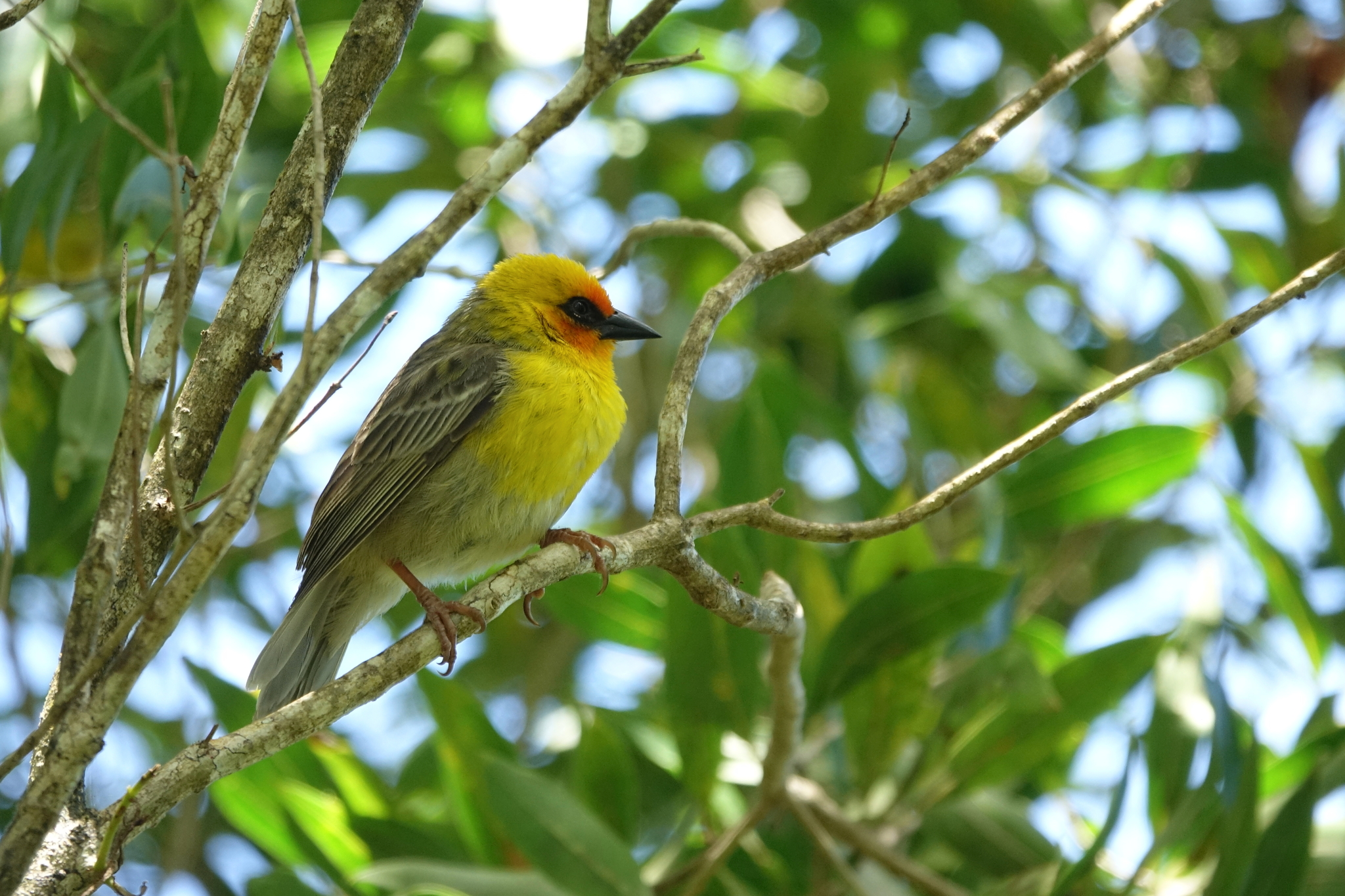

Conservation status
- Least Concern (IUCN 3.1)

Scientific classification
- Kingdom: Animalia
- Phylum: Chordata
- Class: Aves
- Order: Passeriformes
- Family: Ploceidae
- Genus: Foudia
- Species: F. flavicans

Binomial name
- Foudia flavicans A. Newton, 1865

= Rodrigues fody =

Species of bird

The Rodrigues fody (Foudia flavicans) is a rare species of bird in the weaver family. It is endemic to Rodrigues, an island of Mauritius. It is classified by BirdLife International as being vulnerable. It is also on the United States' Endangered Species List with an endangered status.

This bird is 12 to 13 cm (4.7 to 5.1 in) long. It is yellow with an orange face and brown back, wings, and tail.

The bird can be found in the canopy at heights of at least 5 metres (16 ft), and sometimes travels in flocks. It may be associated with the Norfolk Island pine (Araucaria cunninghamii) and some introduced species of plants. More birds are found in areas with more dense stands of taller trees and higher diversity of tree species. It feeds on insects, spiders, seeds, nectar, and fruit.

Once abundant on the island, the bird was nearly driven to extinction with only 5 or 6 pairs remaining by 1968. Due to conservation efforts its numbers rose to between 911 and 1200 individuals by the year 1999.

The main threat to the species is the destruction of its forest habitat. The forest was cleared for subsistence farming and livestock. The bird also competes with its introduced relative, the Madagascar red fody (Foudia madagascariensis). Cyclones and drought reduce the food supply.

Conservation efforts have included reforestation, the main cause of the increase in fody numbers. Fences keep out livestock.
