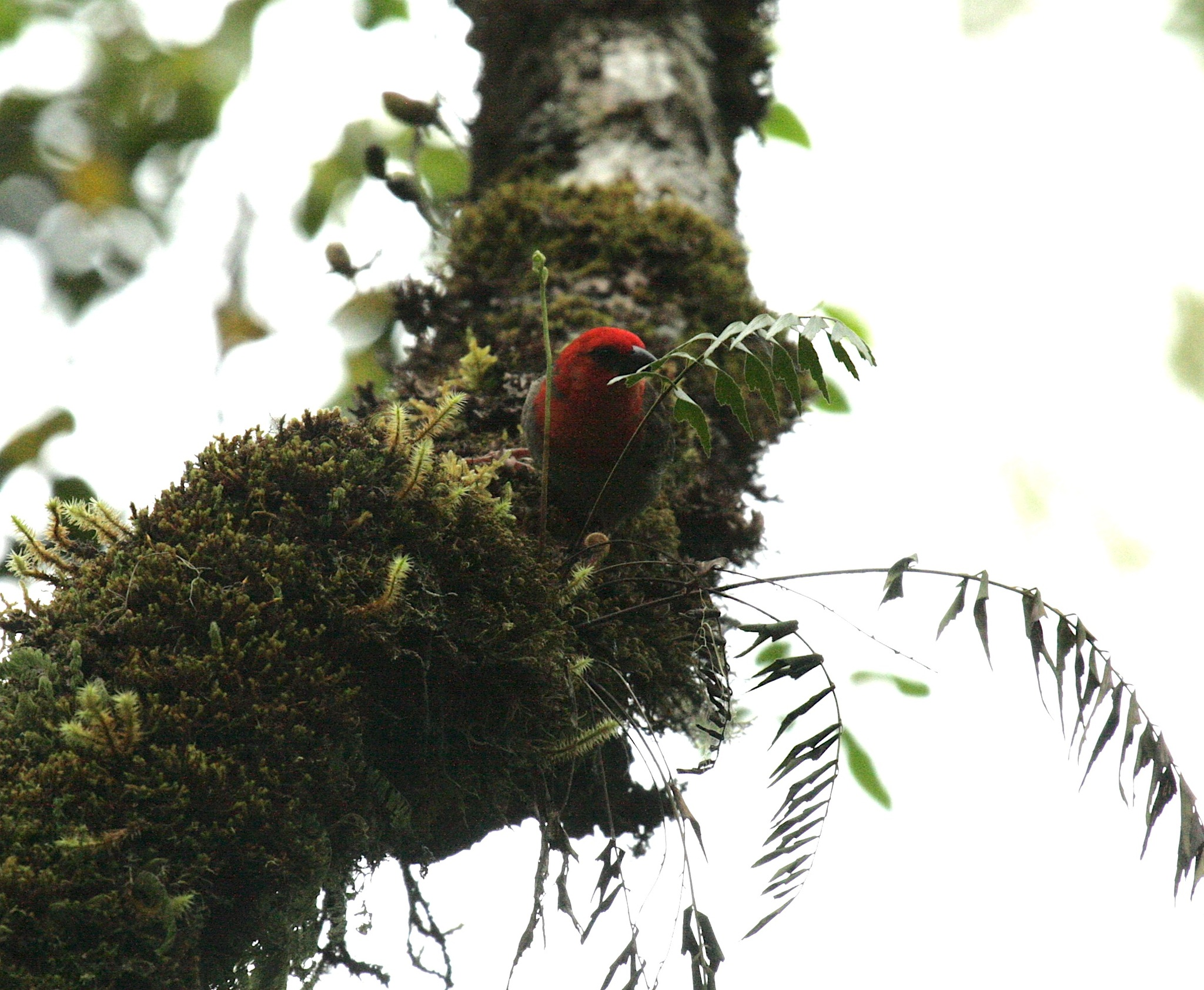

Conservation status
- Least Concern (IUCN 3.1)

Scientific classification
- Kingdom: Animalia
- Phylum: Chordata
- Class: Aves
- Order: Passeriformes
- Family: Ploceidae
- Genus: Foudia
- Species: F. eminentissima

Binomial name
- Foudia eminentissima Bonaparte, 1850

= Comoros fody =

Species of bird

The Comoros fody (Foudia eminentissima), also known as the red-headed fody, is a species of passerine bird in the family Ploceidae. It is found in the Comoros. The taxon aldabrana, was previously often considered a subspecies of the Comoros fody. Previously, the forest fody from Madagascar was considered a subspecies of the Comoros fody.
