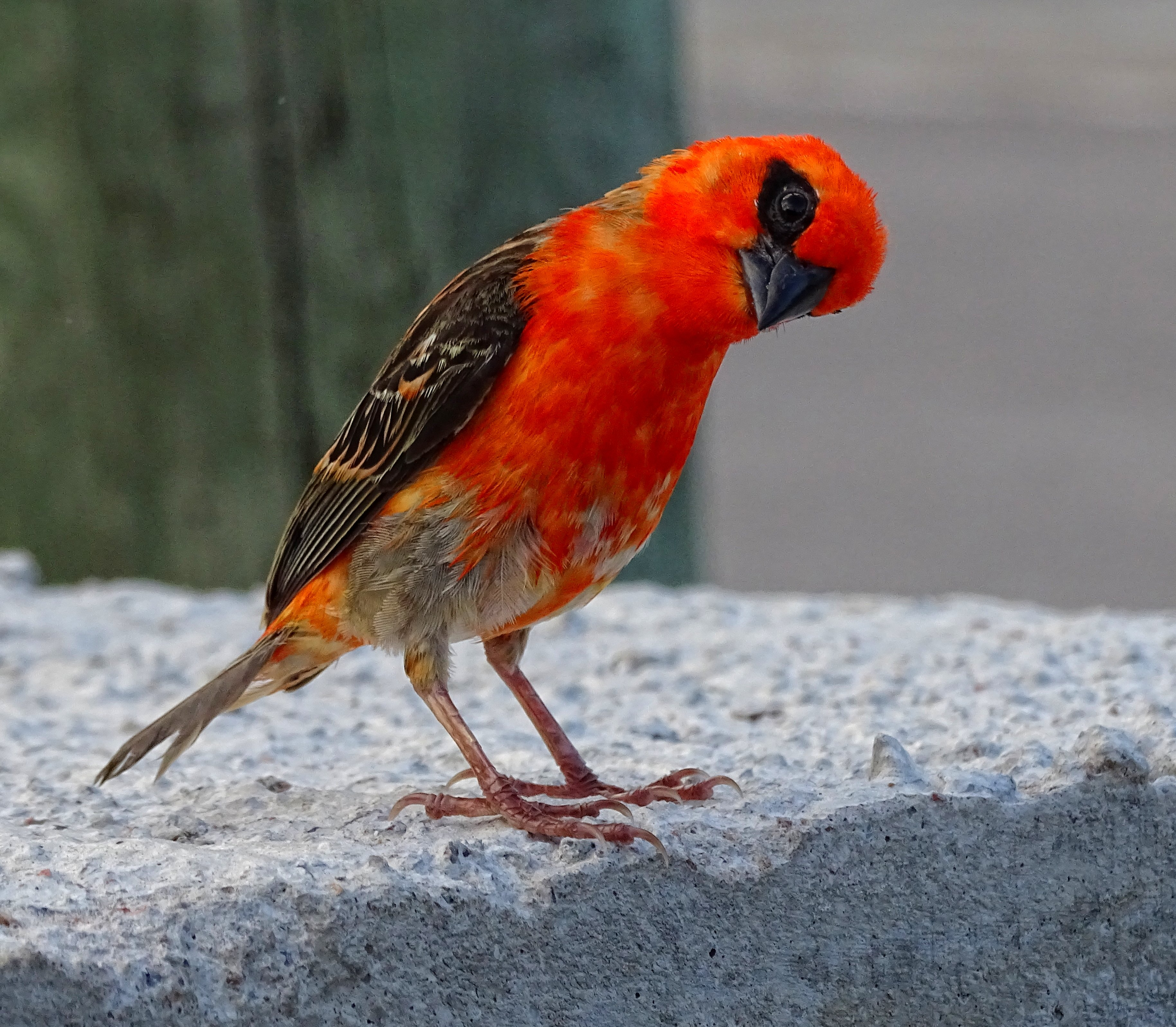
- Male red fody in breeding plumage

Scientific classification
- Kingdom: Animalia
- Phylum: Chordata
- Class: Aves
- Order: Passeriformes
- Family: Ploceidae
- Genus: Foudia; Reichenbach, 1850

Type species
- Loxia madagascariensis Linnaeus, 1766

Species
- see text

= Fody =

Fodies

Genus of birds

Fodies are small passerine birds belonging to the genus Foudia in the weaver family Ploceidae. They are found on islands in the western Indian Ocean.

== Taxonomy ==
The genus Foudia was introduced in 1850 by the German naturalist Ludwig Reichenbach. The name is derived from the Malagasy word for the red fody. Reichenbach did not specify the type species but in 1855 the English zoologist George Gray designated the type as Loxia madagascariensis Linnaeus, 1766, the red fody.

== Description ==
The birds are 12 to 15 centimetres (4.7 to 5.9 in) long and have short, conical bills. Males in breeding plumage are usually colourful with bright red or yellow on the head and sometimes elsewhere. Non-breeding males and females are dull, sparrow-like birds with mostly grey-brown plumage.

Fodies are typically found in forest, woodland or scrubland but some also occur in man-made habitats, especially the red fody. Some species feed mainly on seeds while others are largely insectivorous. Fodies build a dome-shaped nest of grass and other plant material. It has a side-opening and it is suspended from a branch or palm leaf.

== Distribution ==
They are native to the islands of the western Indian Ocean where they occur on Madagascar, the Seychelles, the Comoro Islands and the Mascarene Islands. The red fody has also been introduced to the Chagos Archipelago, Bahrain and Saint Helena. While the red fody is one of the most common birds of the region, several of the other fodies are considered to be threatened, particularly the Mauritius fody which is classed as endangered.

== Species list ==
The genus contains seven extant species, and one extinct species:

Image	Common name	Scientific name	Distribution	Status
	Red fody or Madagascar fody	Foudia madagascariensis	Madagascar	Least Concern
	Comoros fody or red-headed fody	Foudia eminentissima	Comoros, Mayotte and Seychelles	Least Concern
	Aldabra fody	Foudia aldabrana	Aldabra Island	Vulnerable
	Forest fody	Foudia omissa	Madagascar.	Least Concern
	Mauritius fody	Foudia rubra	Mauritius	Endangered
	Seychelles fody	Foudia sechellarum	Seychelles islands of Cousin Island, Cousine Island, Frégate Island	Near Threatened
	Rodrigues fody	Foudia flavicans	Mauritius	Endangered
	†Réunion fody	†Foudia delloni	Réunion	Extinct (1672)

== Sources ==
- Sinclair, Ian & Langrand, Olivier (1998) Birds of the Indian Ocean Islands, Struik, Cape Town.
- Skerrett, Adrian; Bullock, Ian & Disley, Tony (2001) Birds of Seychelles, Christopher Helm, London.
