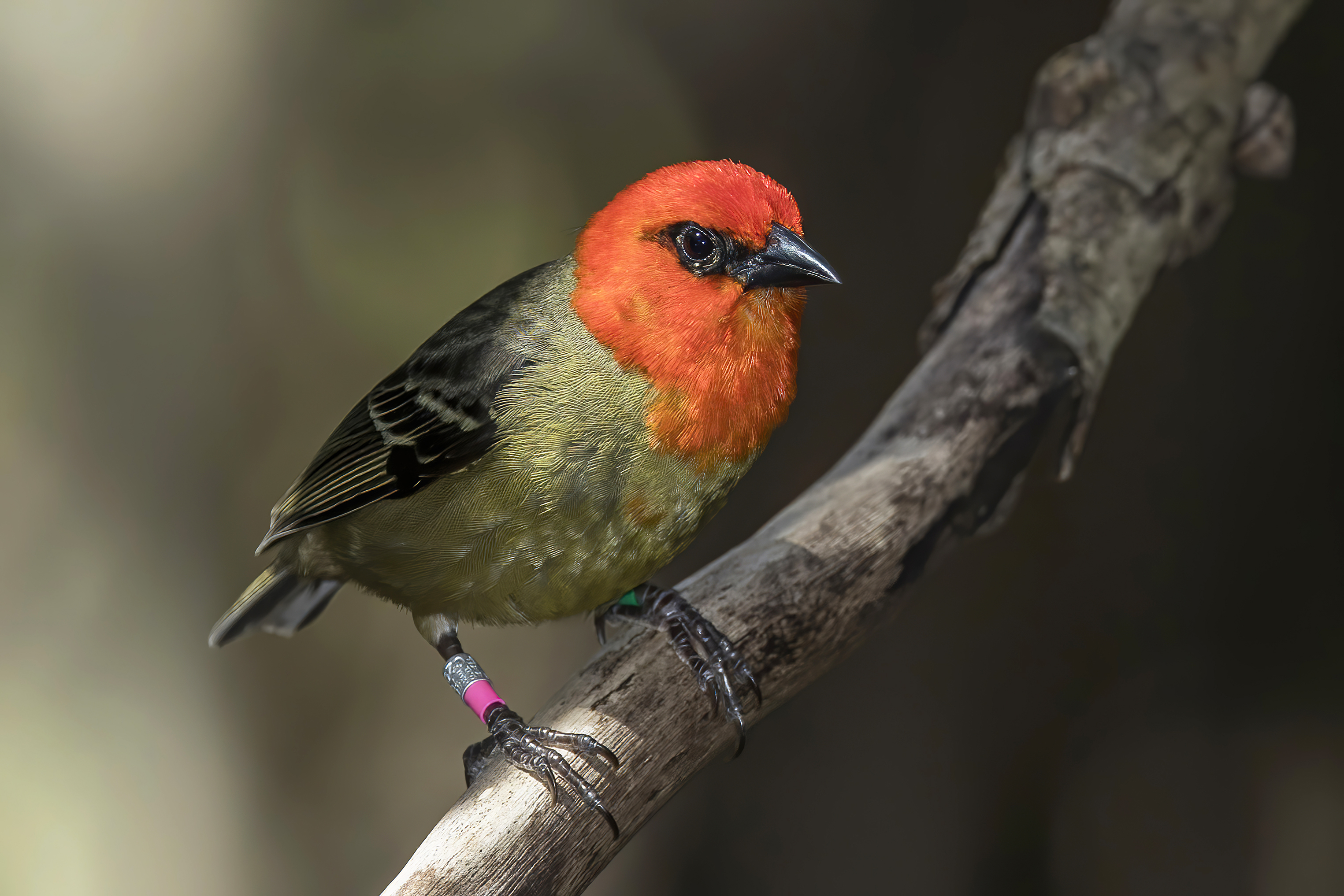
- Male
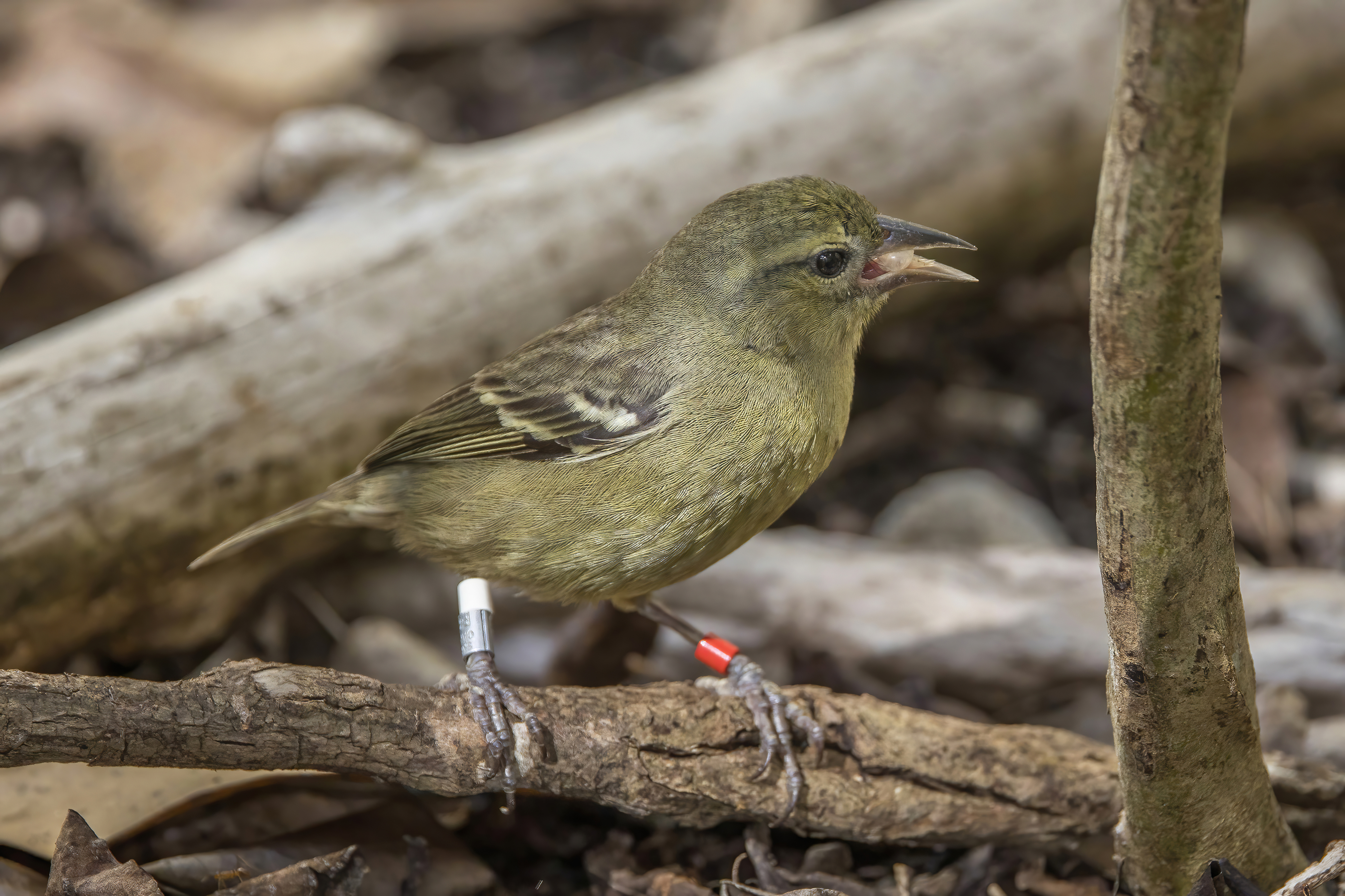
- Female both on Île aux Aigrettes

Conservation status
- Endangered (IUCN 3.1)

Scientific classification
- Kingdom: Animalia
- Phylum: Chordata
- Class: Aves
- Order: Passeriformes
- Family: Ploceidae
- Genus: Foudia
- Species: F. rubra

Binomial name
- Foudia rubra (Gmelin, JF, 1789)

= Mauritius fody =

Species of bird

The Mauritius fody (Foudia rubra) is a rare species of bird in the weaver family. It is endemic to the island of Mauritius. It is classified by BirdLife International as being endangered. It is also on the United States' Endangered Species List with an endangered status.

== Taxonomy ==
The Mauritius fody was formally described in 1789 by the German naturalist Johann Friedrich Gmelin in his revised and expanded edition of Carl Linnaeus's Systema Naturae. He placed it with the buntings in the genus Emberiza and coined the binomial name Emberiza rubra. Gmelin specified the location as the French colony of the Isle de France, now Mauritius. The specific epithet is from Latin ruber meaning "red". Gmelin based his account on a hand-colour engraving by François-Nicolas Martinet that depicted both the male and female birds. The Mauritius fody is now one of eight species placed in the genus Foudia that was introduced in 1850 by the German naturalist Ludwig Reichenbach. The species is monotypic: no subspecies are recognised.

== Description ==
This bird is 14 centimetres (5.5 in) long. Breeding males are olive brown with a red head, breast and rump patch and black lores. Females, non-breeding males and juveniles are olive brown with white wing bars and a brown bill.

== Distribution and habitat ==
The bird lives in several types of forest, including degraded areas, as well as plantations. Stands of Japanese cedar (Cryptomeria japonica) have replaced native vegetation and now provide protection against predators. It feeds on insects like grasshoppers, beetle larvae, caterpillars, and also spiders. Berries are eaten regularly by some individuals. It feeds on nectar regularly, using its specialised brush-tipped tongue.

The bird is a weaver, the male and female cooperating to weave each nest, from material such as grass, moss and small twigs.

== Status ==
The Mauritius fody is threatened by the loss of its habitat and predation from introduced predators. Beginning in the 1970s much of its habitat was lost when the land was cleared for plantations. By 2001 there were perhaps no more than about 100 breeding pairs. Nests are raided by predators, especially the black rat (Rattus rattus) and the crab-eating macaque (Macaca fascicularis). This is currently the main cause of the bird's decline. Some areas of intact habitat have high nest predation, but areas of low nest predation may be poor habitat. The common myna has also been observed preying on nests. Nest failure may occur when it is infested with tropical nest fly. The larvae of the fly attack the chicks, latching on and feeding on their blood, causing dehydration and anemia in the chicks.

Conservation efforts include the control of rats and macaques. A captive breeding program carried out by the Mauritan Wildlife Foundation has produced many chicks. Eggs are removed from nests in the wild and hatched in captivity as the wild pairs produce and rear another clutch simultaneously. Nests are treated for tropical nest fly. Supplemental food and water are given. The population has increased recently due to conservation programs establishing sub-populations on offshore islands. Due to these conservation efforts the species was downlisted from critically endangered to endangered in 2009.

Île aux Aigrettes, an islet off the main island of Mauritius, is now home to a number of Mauritius fodies and other threatened species that have been translocated there.
