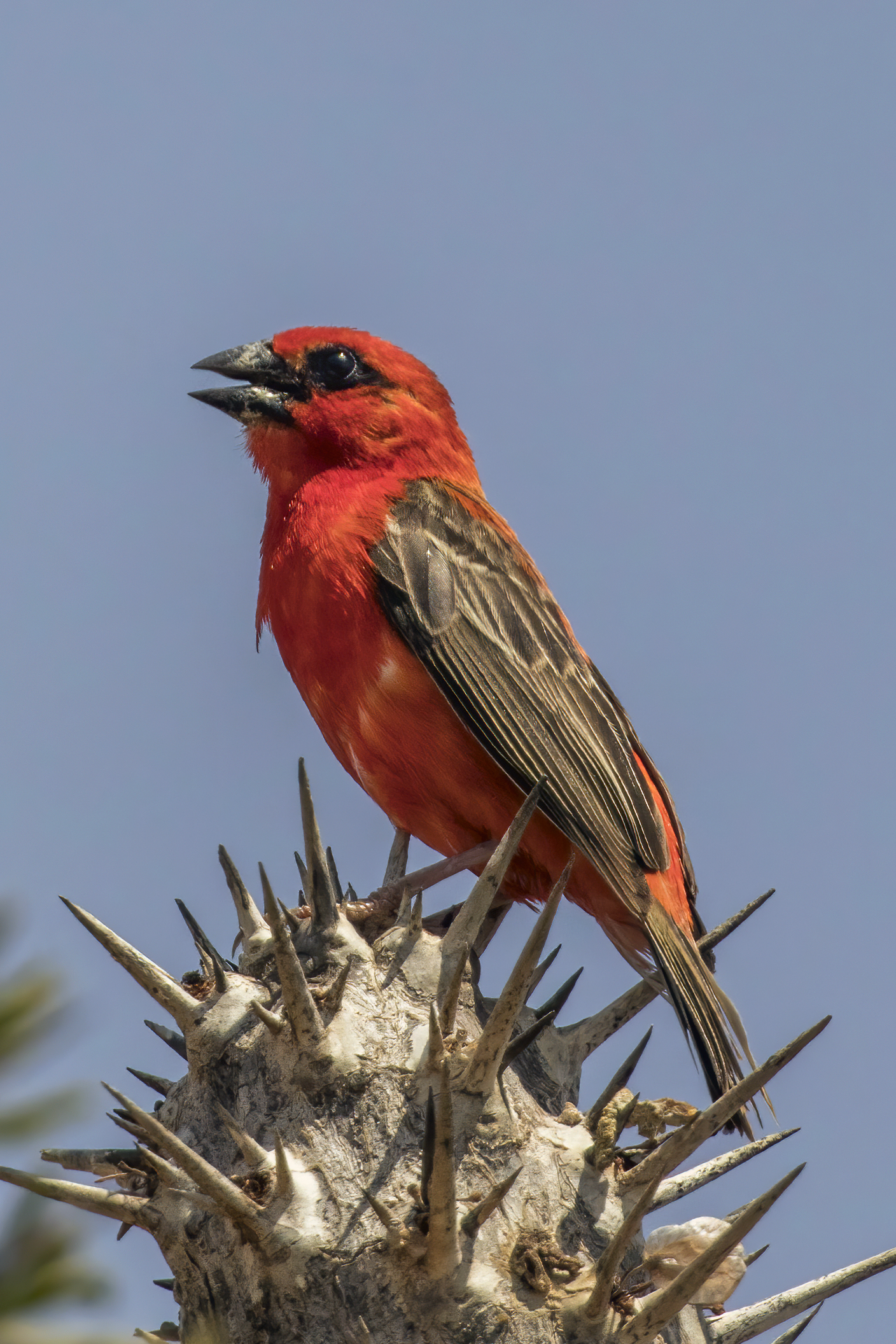
- Tsimanampetsotsa National Park, Madagascar
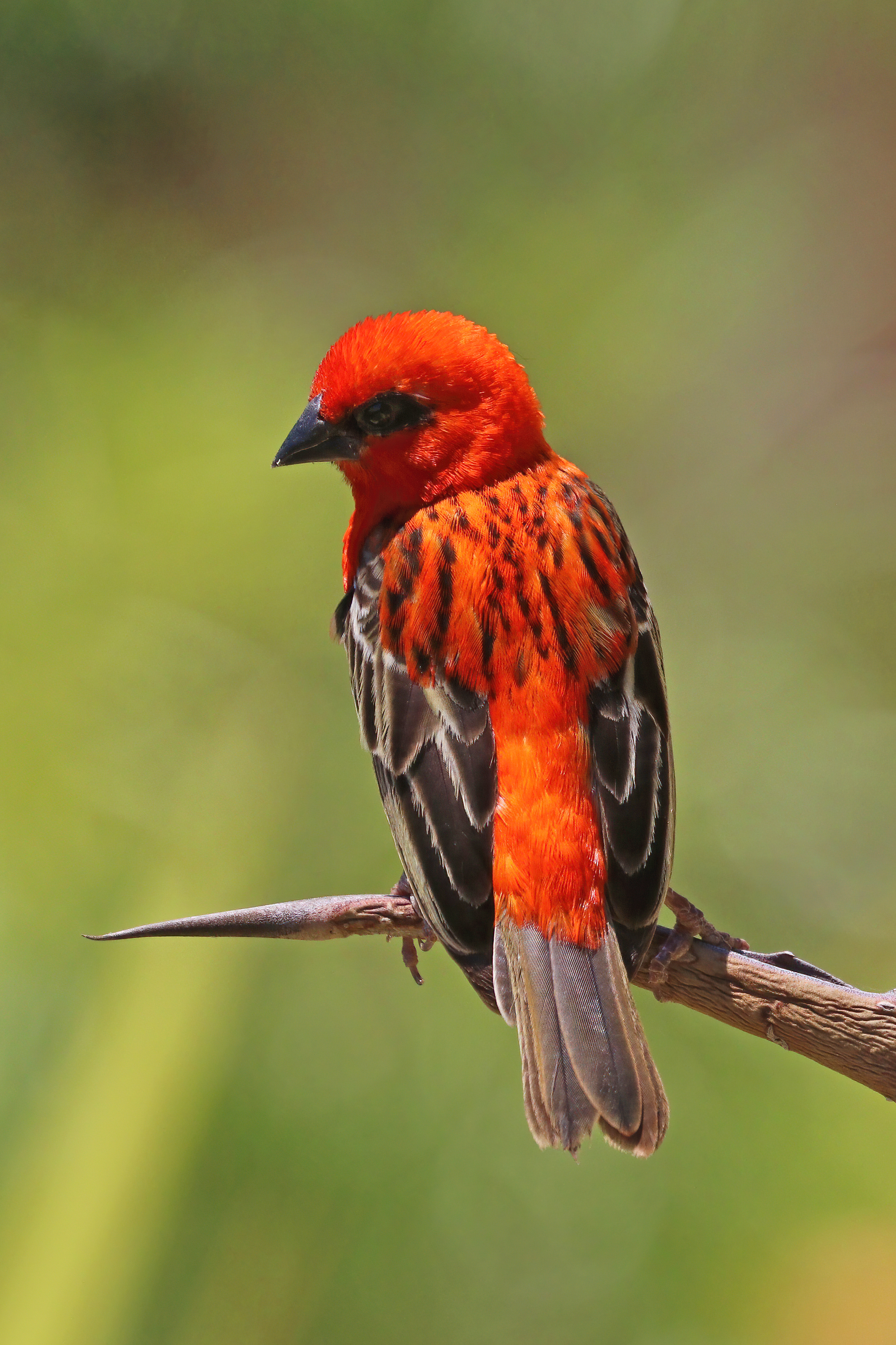
- Toliara, Madagascar

Conservation status
- Least Concern (IUCN 3.1)

Scientific classification
- Kingdom: Animalia
- Phylum: Chordata
- Class: Aves
- Order: Passeriformes
- Family: Ploceidae
- Genus: Foudia
- Species: F. madagascariensis

Binomial name
- Foudia madagascariensis (Linnaeus, 1766)

Synonyms
- Loxia madagascariensis Linnaeus, 1766

= Red fody =

Species of bird

The red fody (Foudia madagascariensis), also known as the Madagascar fody in Madagascar, red cardinal fody in Mauritius, or common fody, is a small bird native to Madagascar and introduced to various other islands in the Indian Ocean. It is a common bird within its restricted range, and the International Union for Conservation of Nature has assessed its conservation status as being of "least concern".

== Taxonomy ==
In 1760, the French zoologist Mathurin Jacques Brisson included a description of the red fody in his Ornithologie based on a specimen collected in Madagascar. He used the French name Le cardinal de Madagascar and the Latin Cardinalis Madagascariensis. Although Brisson coined Latin names, these do not conform to the binomial system and are not recognised by the International Commission on Zoological Nomenclature. When in 1766 the Swedish naturalist Carl Linnaeus updated his Systema Naturae for the twelfth edition, he added 240 species that had been previously described by Brisson. One of these was the red fody. Linnaeus included a brief description, coined the binomial name Loxia madagascariensis and cited Brisson's work. This species is now placed in the genus Foudia that was introduced by the German naturalist Ludwig Reichenbach in 1850. The type species was subsequently designated as the red fody. The species is monotypic.

== Description ==
The red fody is about 13 centimetres (5.1 in) in length and weighs 14–19 grams (0.49–0.67 oz). The male of the species is bright red with black markings around each eye. Its wings and tail are brown. Its underparts are also red, which distinguishes it from other fodies in areas where it has been introduced. The female red fody's upper parts are olive-brown and its underparts are greyish brown.

== Distribution and habitat ==
It is a common bird found in forest clearings, grasslands and cultivated areas, but not in dense forest. In Madagascar it is regarded as a pest of rice cultivation. It has been introduced to other areas of the Indian Ocean, included the Amirantes, Comoros, Seychelles, Mauritius, Réunion and Saint Helena.

== Ecology ==
The red fody feeds largely on seeds, especially grass seeds, and insects, but several other foodstuffs are also taken; these include fruit, nectar, household scraps and copra.

Outside the breeding season, this bird is gregarious. As the breeding season approaches, males establish territories, about 30 m (100 ft) in diameter. The birds are monogamous, and the male starts building the nest in the centre of the territory before courtship commences, with nests being clustered together in loose colonies. The nest is globular with a side entrance and porch or short tube. It is constructed, mostly by the male, out of rootlets, tendrils, grasses and other long strands of vegetation, woven together. The nest takes around eight days to build, and many get abandoned if the male fails to attract a mate.

== Impact on native birds ==
In different parts of its introduced range, this species show different impacts on native birds. Both the endangered Mauritius fody (Foudia rubra) and the Rodrigues fody (Foudia flavicans) have been affected by the competition for resources on their respective islands.

== Gallery ==
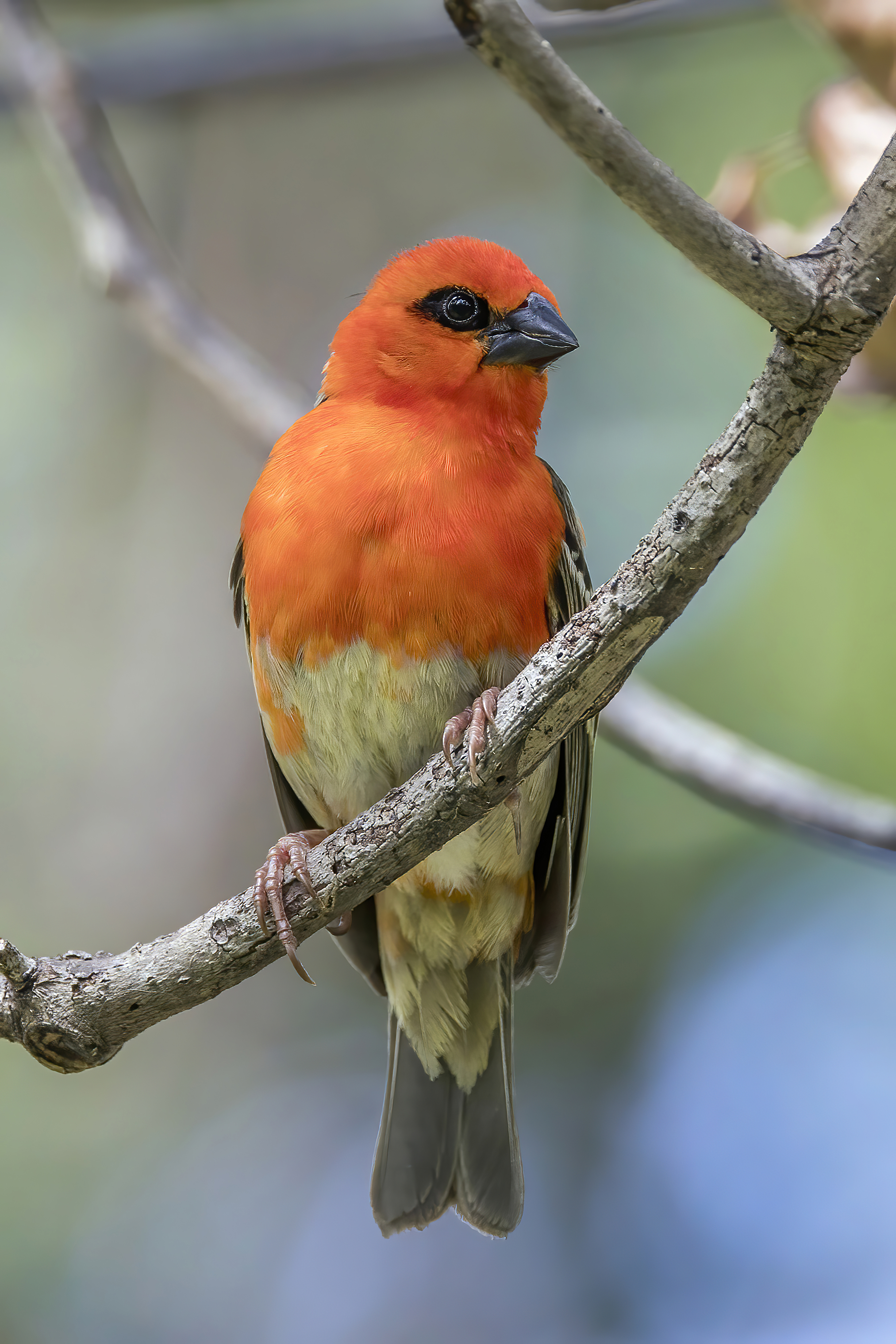
Male, start of transition plumage, La Réunion

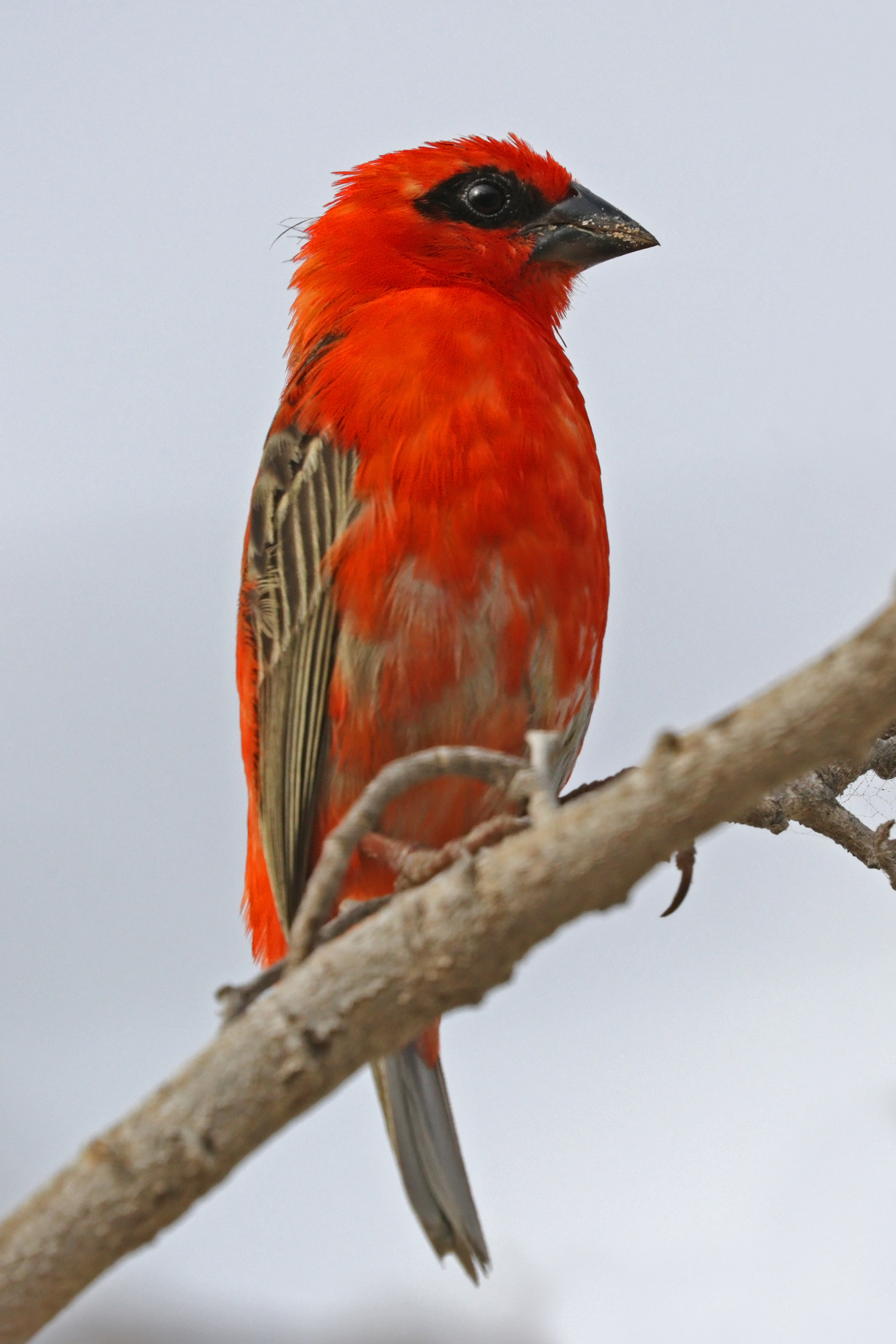
Male, transition into breeding plumage, Madagascar

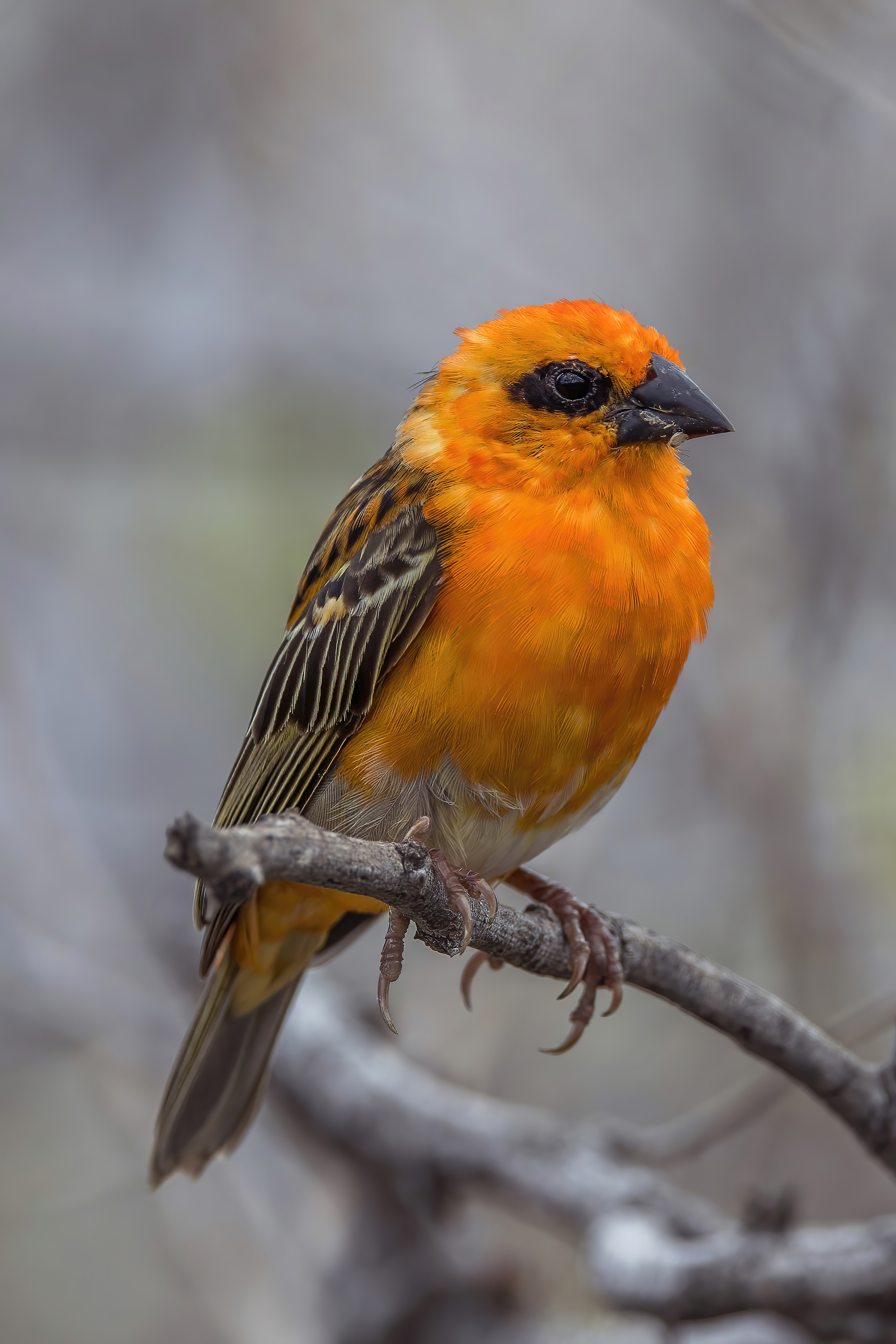
Male on La Réunion

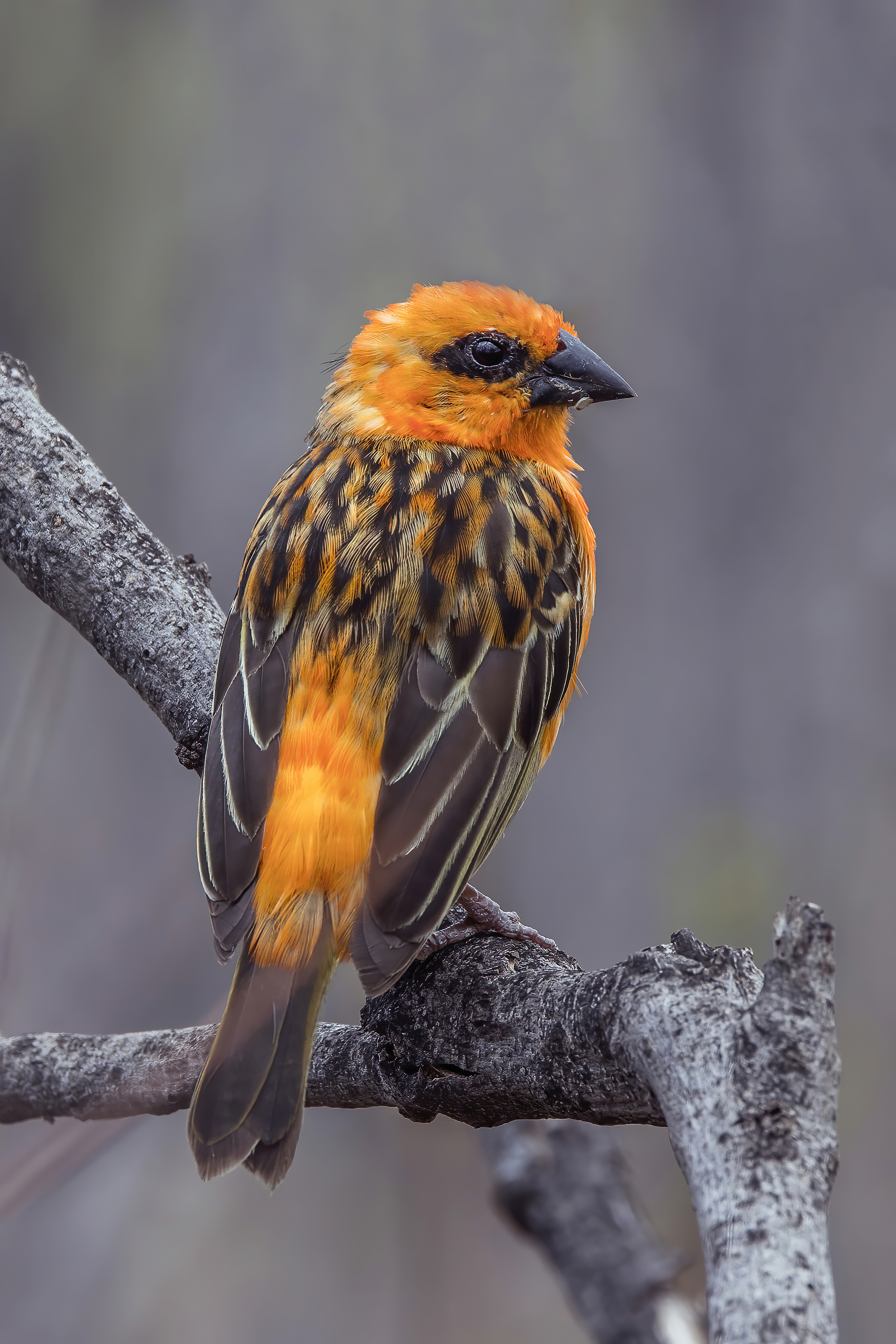
Male on La Réunion

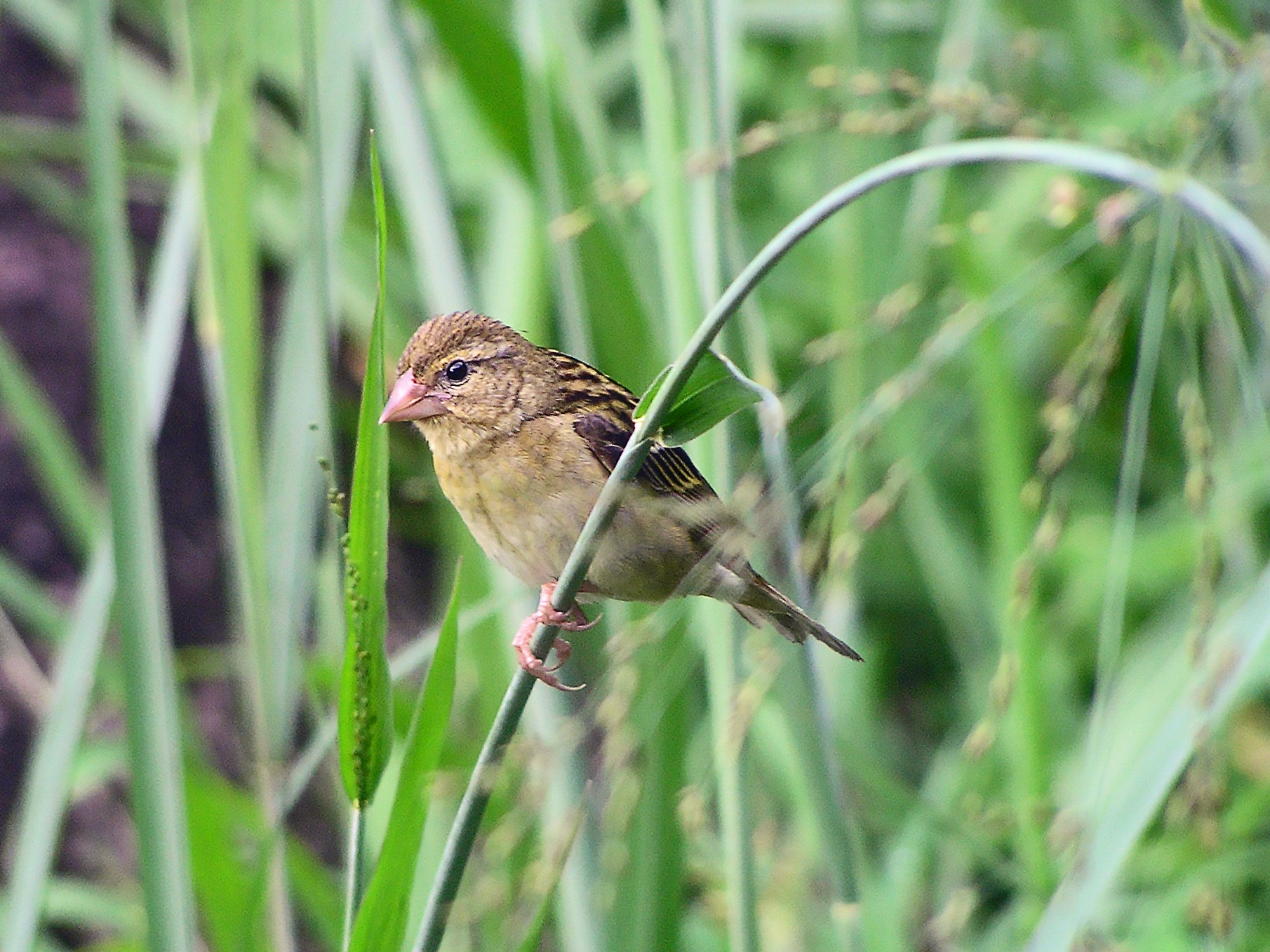
Female

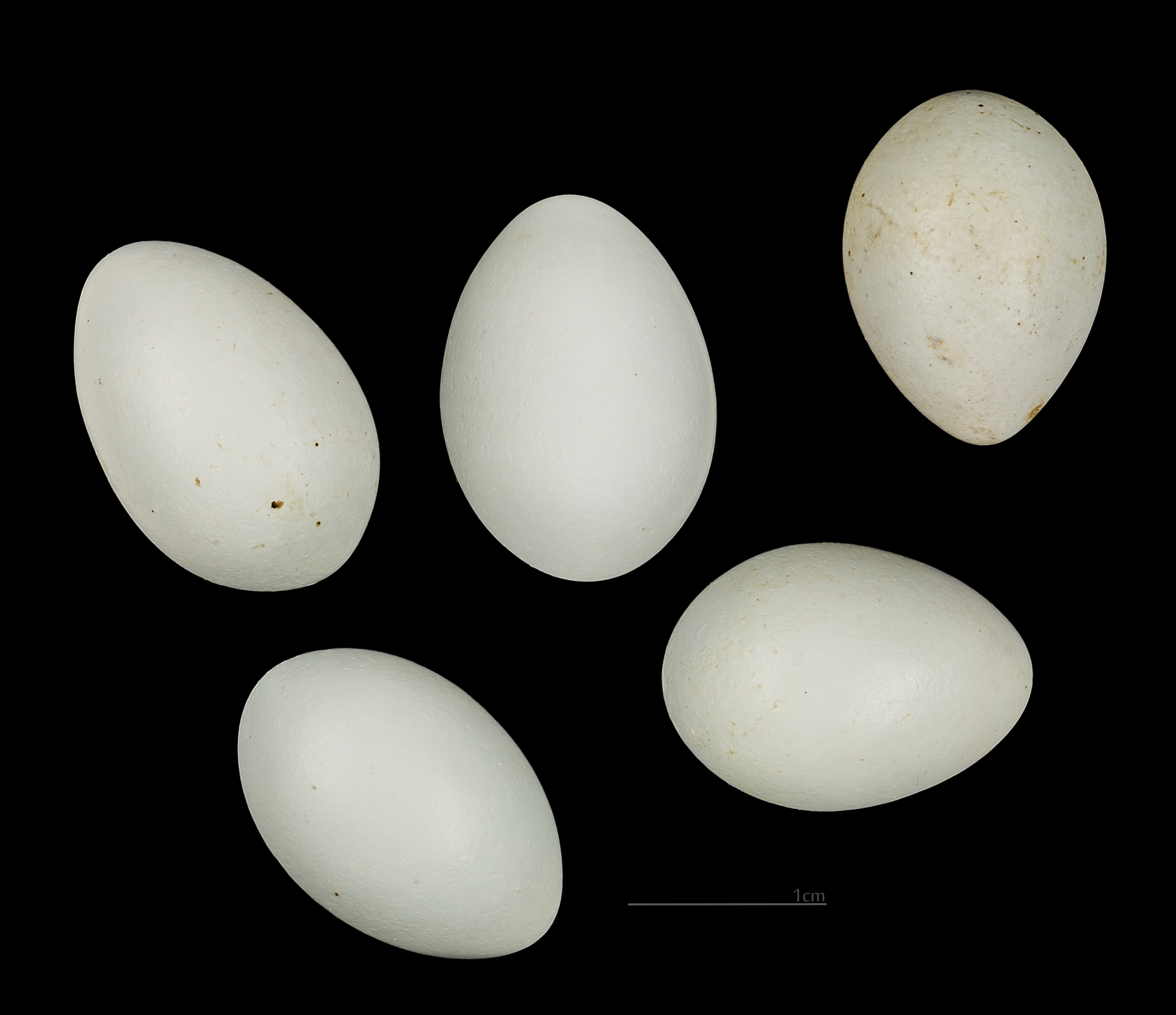
Eggs MHNT
