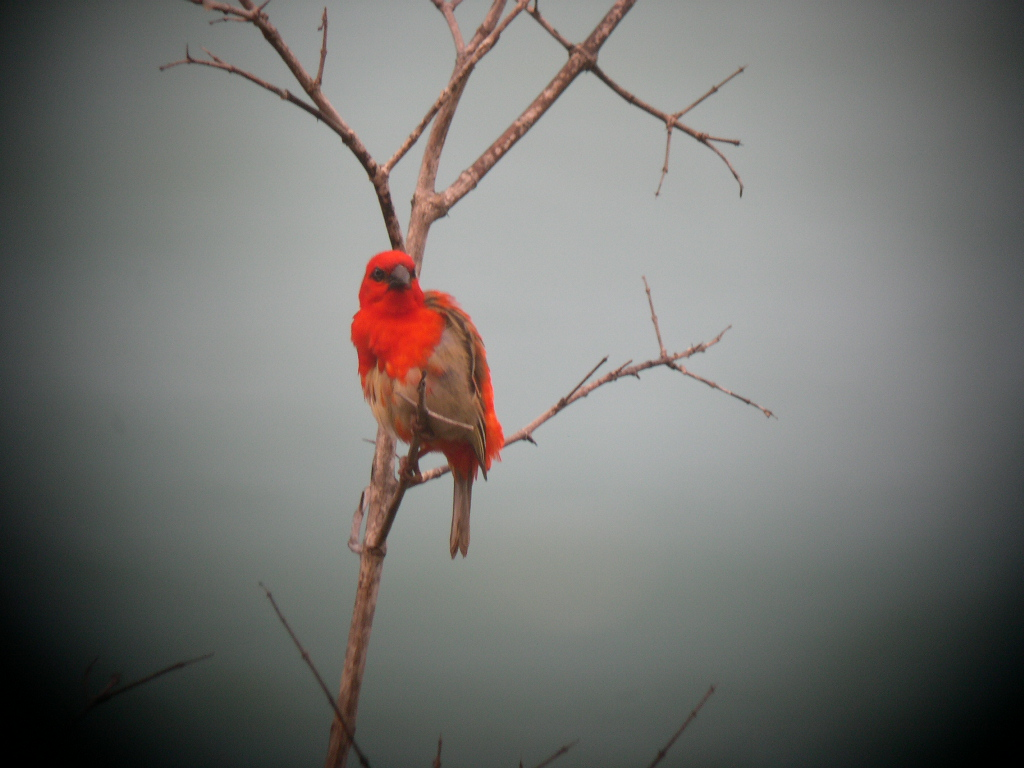

Conservation status
- Least Concern (IUCN 3.1)

Scientific classification
- Kingdom: Animalia
- Phylum: Chordata
- Class: Aves
- Order: Passeriformes
- Family: Ploceidae
- Genus: Foudia
- Species: F. omissa

Binomial name
- Foudia omissa Rothschild, 1912

= Forest fody =

Species of bird

The forest fody (Foudia omissa) is a species of bird in the family Ploceidae. It is endemic to Madagascar.

== Range and habitat ==
The forest fody ranges across eastern Madagascar from the northern to the southern ends of the island. There are a few outlier populations in the southwest of the island, including on the Isalo and Analavelona massifs.

Its natural habitat is lowland rainforest and humid and subhumid montane forests up to 2,000 meters elevation.

== Conservation ==
The species has a large range, and is considered fairly common across it. The population of the species is decreasing, principally from habitat loss. Its conservation status is assessed as least concern.
