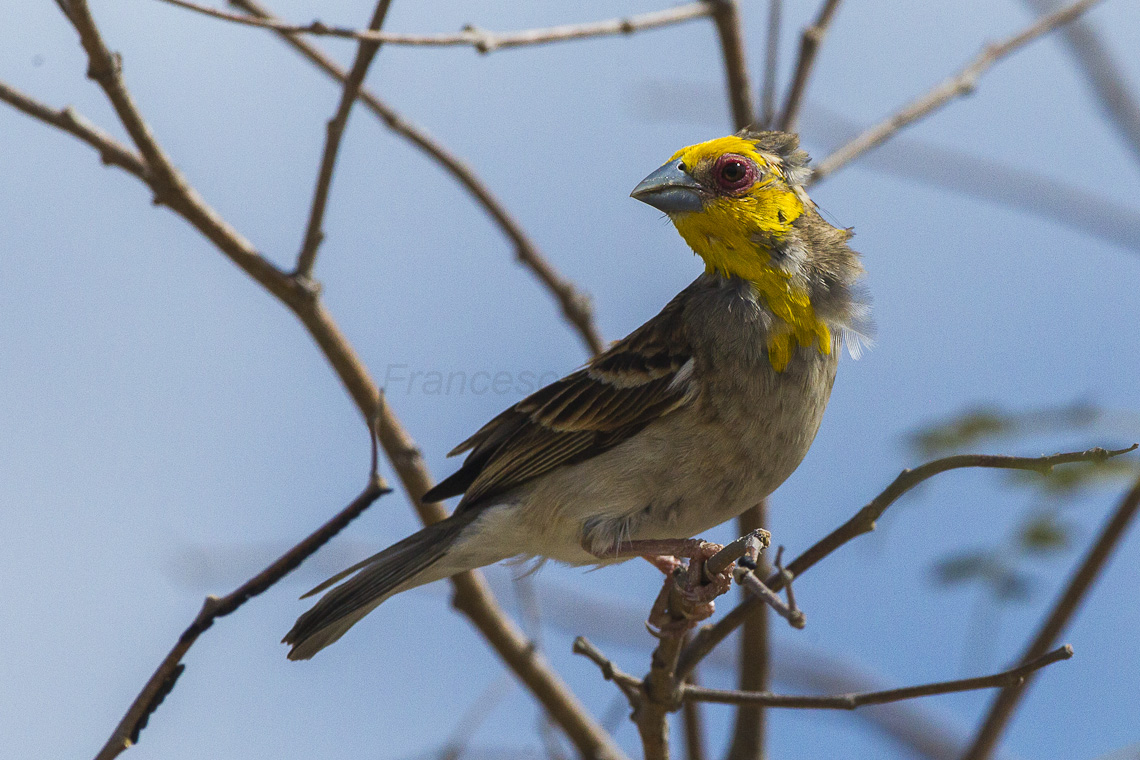
- ↑ male, ↓ female
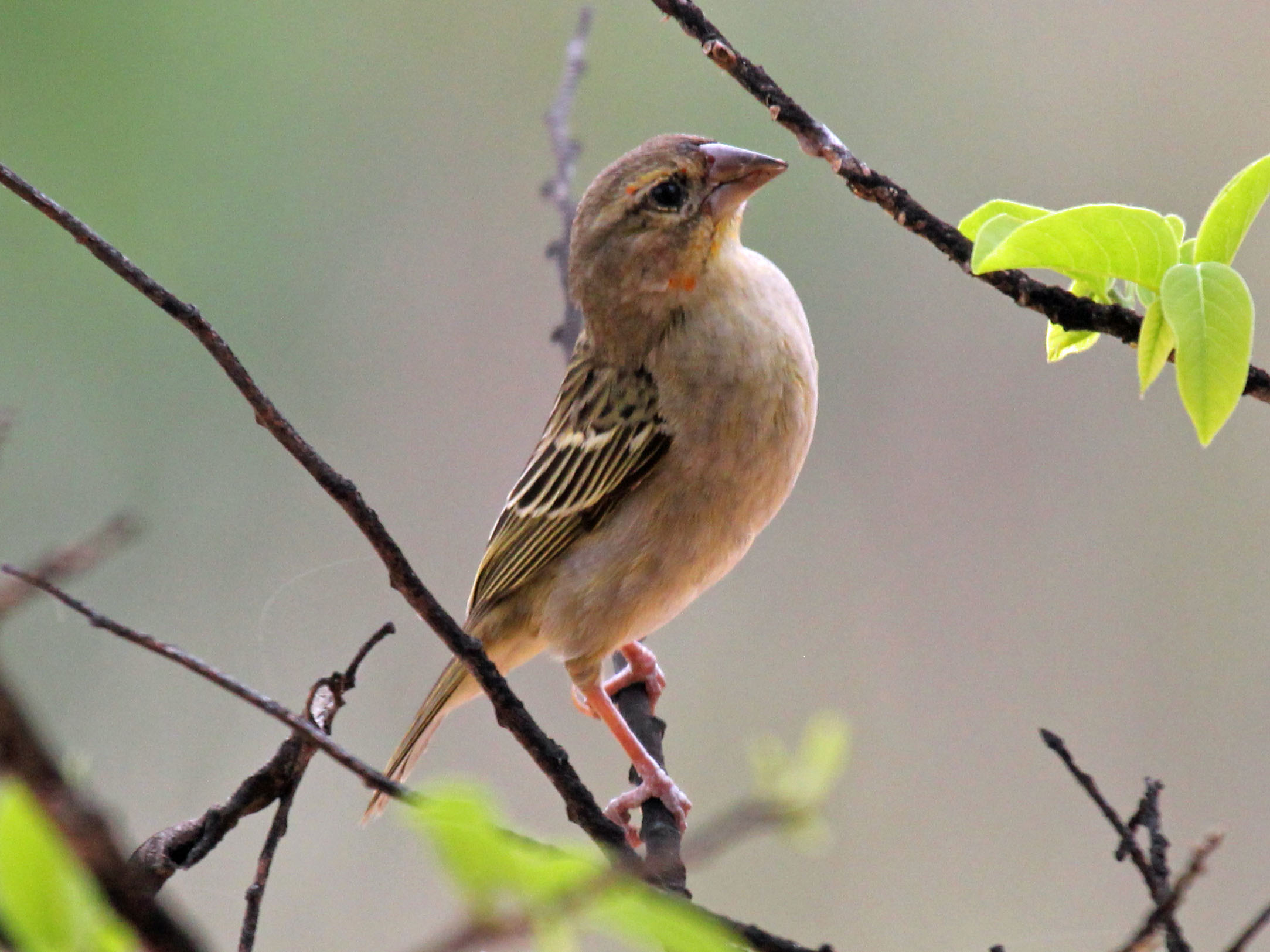

Conservation status
- Least Concern (IUCN 3.1)

Scientific classification
- Kingdom: Animalia
- Phylum: Chordata
- Class: Aves
- Order: Passeriformes
- Family: Ploceidae
- Genus: Ploceus
- Species: P. sakalava

Binomial name
- Ploceus sakalava Hartlaub, 1861

= Sakalava weaver =

Species of bird

The Sakalava weaver (Ploceus sakalava) sometimes known as the Sakalava fody is a species of bird in the family Ploceidae. It is endemic to Madagascar. The bird is 15 cm (5.9 in) long and weighs 20–28 g (0.71–0.99 oz).

== Taxonomy ==
The Sakalava weaver was first described by Gustav Hartlaub in 1861, based on a specimen collected by Victor Sganzin during an expedition in 1831–32 on Madagascar. The species epithet sakalava is derived from the Sakalava, whose name means "people of the long valleys". The first English name was given to the bird only in 1891 by James Sibree, who named it Sakalava Weaver-bird. Sakalava weaver has been designated the official name by the International Ornithological Committee (IOC). Another English name that is sometimes used is Sakalava Fody. Local names in the Malagasy language include fodibeotse, fodisahy, tsiaka, draky and zaky.

Based on recent DNA-analysis, the genus Ploceus is almost certainly polyphyletic. If all species currently included in the genus would remain and the genus would be made monophyletic, it would have to encompass the entire subfamily Ploceinae. The Ploceinae can be divided into two groups. In the first group, the widowbirds and bishops (genus Euplectes) are sister to a clade in which the genera Foudia and Quelea are closest relatives and which further includes the Asiatic species of Ploceus, i.e. P. manyar, P. philippinus, P. benghalensis, P. megarhynchus, (and P. hypoxanthus, although untested). Since Georges Cuvier picked P. philippinus as the type species, these five species would logically remain assigned to the genus Ploceus.

Basic to the second group is a clade consisting of both species sofar included in Ploceus that live on Madagascar, P. nelicourvi and P. sakalava, and these are morphologically very distinctive from the remaining species. These two species could in future be assigned to the genus Nelicurvius that was erected by Charles Lucien Bonaparte in 1850, but which was merged with Ploceus later on. This second group further contains the genera Malimbus and Anaplectes, and all remaining Ploceus species.

- subfamily Ploceinae
  - - - - "true Ploceus"
          the five Asian species of Ploceus
        - - genus Foudia
          - genus Quelea
      - genus Euplectes
  - - "reinstated Nelicurvius"
      - P. sakalava
      - P. nelicourvi
    - "extended Malimbus"
      all mainland African species of "Ploceus", Malimbus and Anaplectes

== Distribution ==
It is found in small flocks. Its natural habitat is the dry lowland forests and scrubland of the north, west and south of Madagascar. Its natural habitats are subtropical or tropical dry forests and subtropical or tropical dry shrubland.

== Description ==
The adult male has a yellow head and upper breast during the breeding season, with a pale grey belly and light and brown wings with white wing-tips. The male has distinctive red eye-rings and silver bill extending with a "V" shape into the forehead. The non-breeding male has a dark brown head and pale grey breast, flanked with white.

The female has the appearance more of a house sparrow with pale almost white breast and duller slightly pink bill. The female also has a red eye-ring and sometimes small flashes of red around the eye.

== Ecology and behaviour ==
Like in other true weaver birds, the roofed nest is woven from strips of grass leaf, but the Sakalava weaver also uses strips of palm frond or thatching and weaving materials collected in villages. The top is woven directly around a branch or attached from a short woven stalk. It is shaped like a retort, with a pear-shaped nesting chamber and a long entrance tunnel hanging from the top. The fabric is thin but dense, although less so with the tunnel, which may be slightly transparent and which may also be somewhat wider at both ends.

== Gallery ==
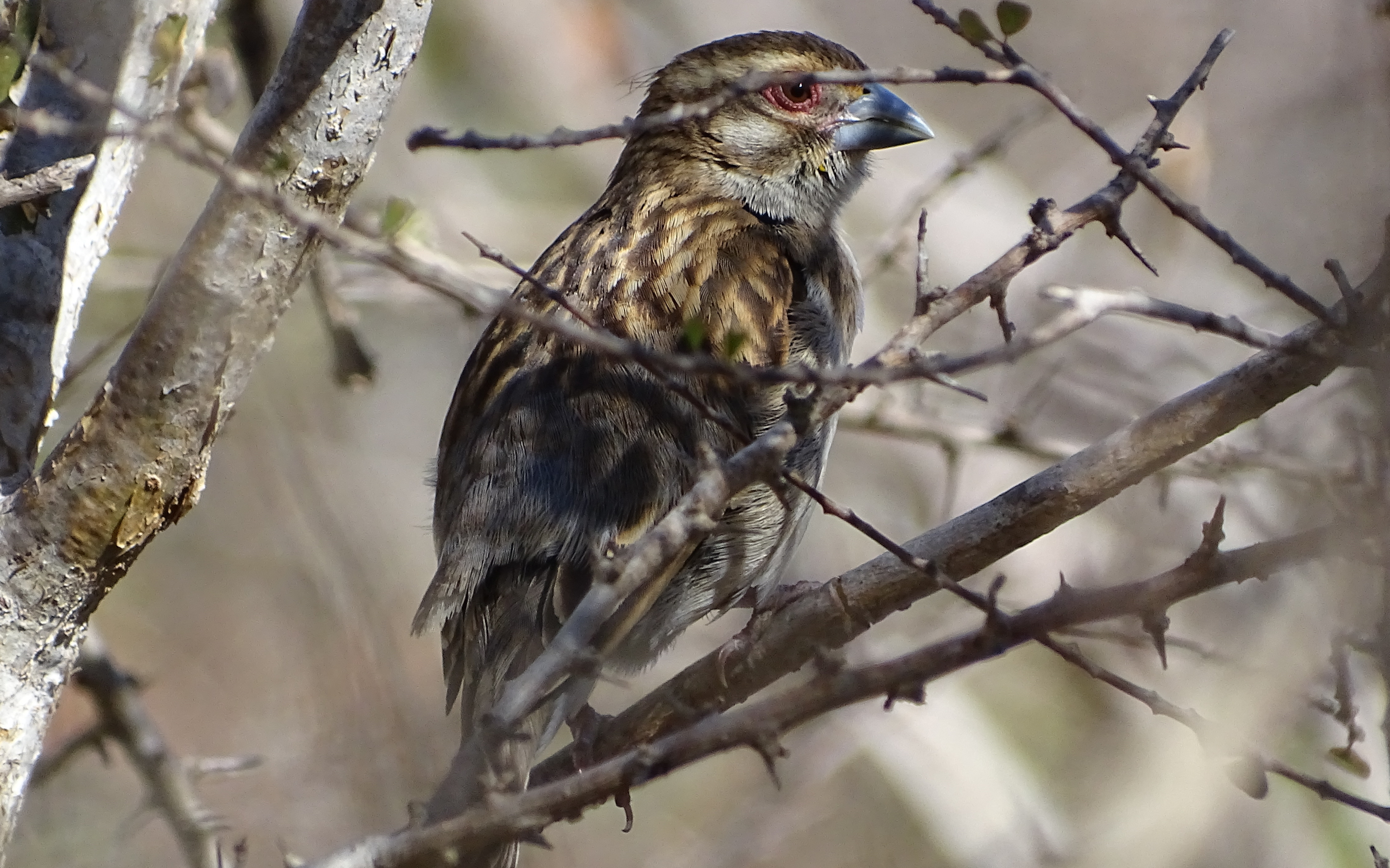
Sakalava weaver near Toliara

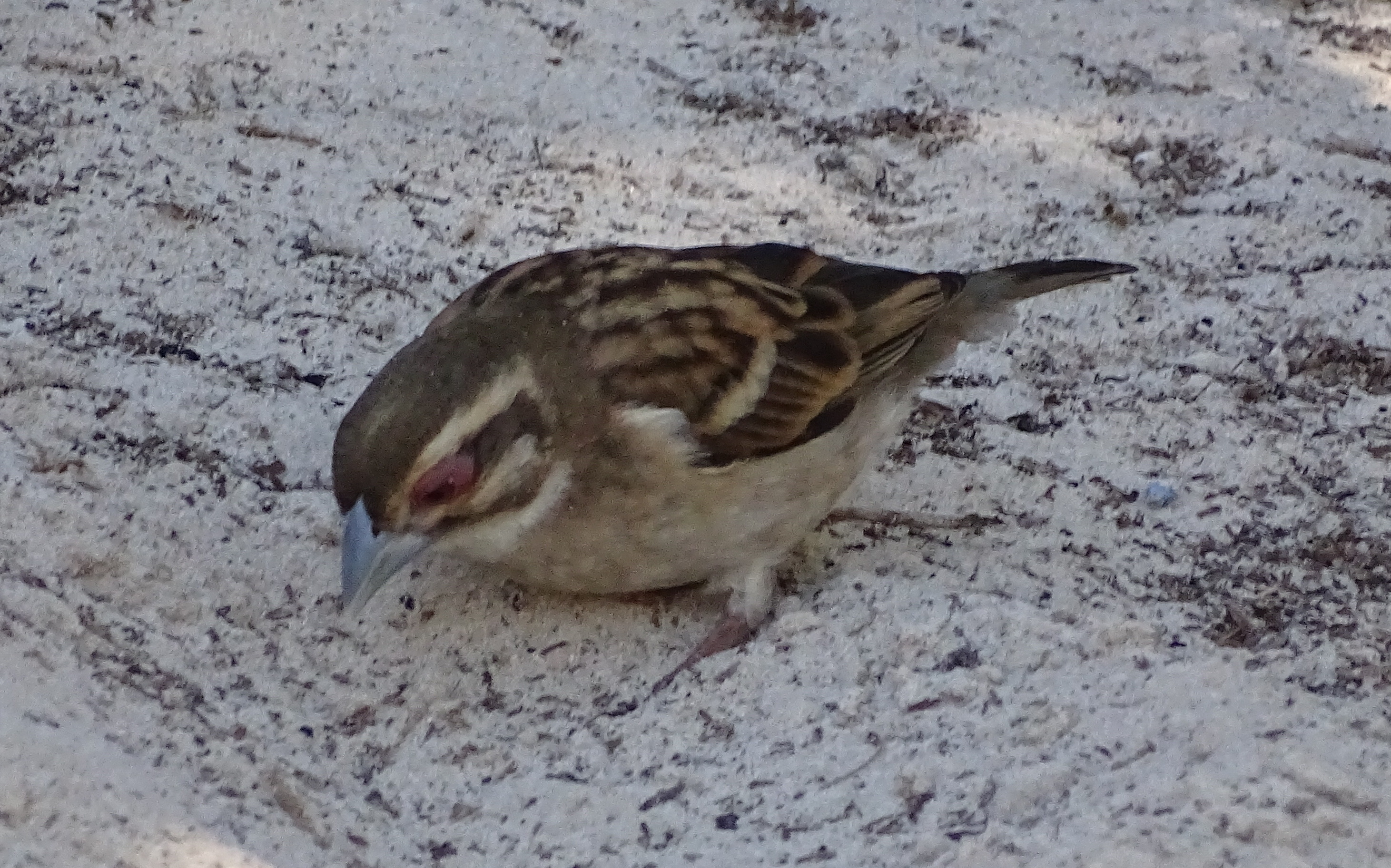
Sakalava weaver at Soalara

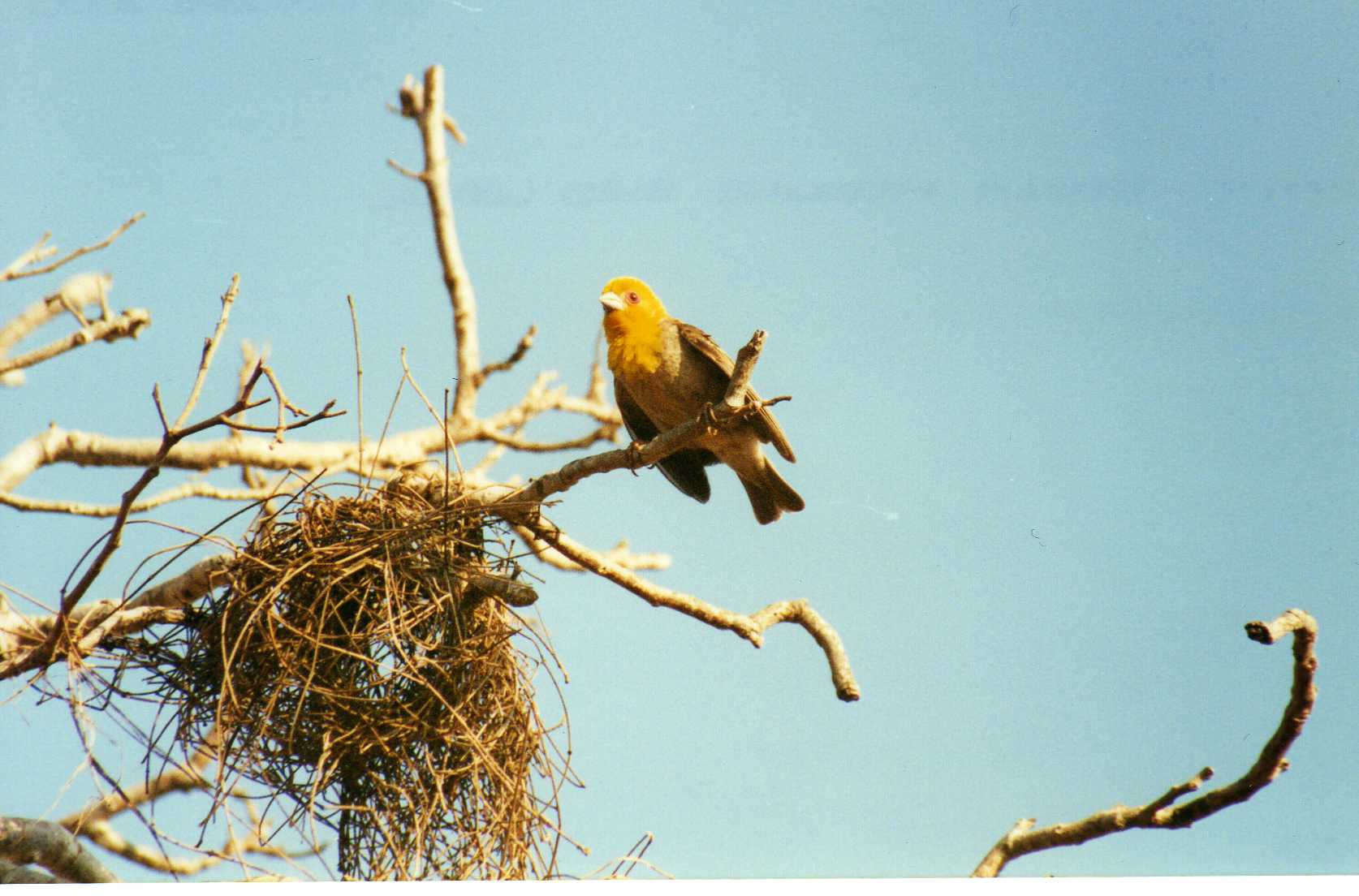
Male sakalava weaver

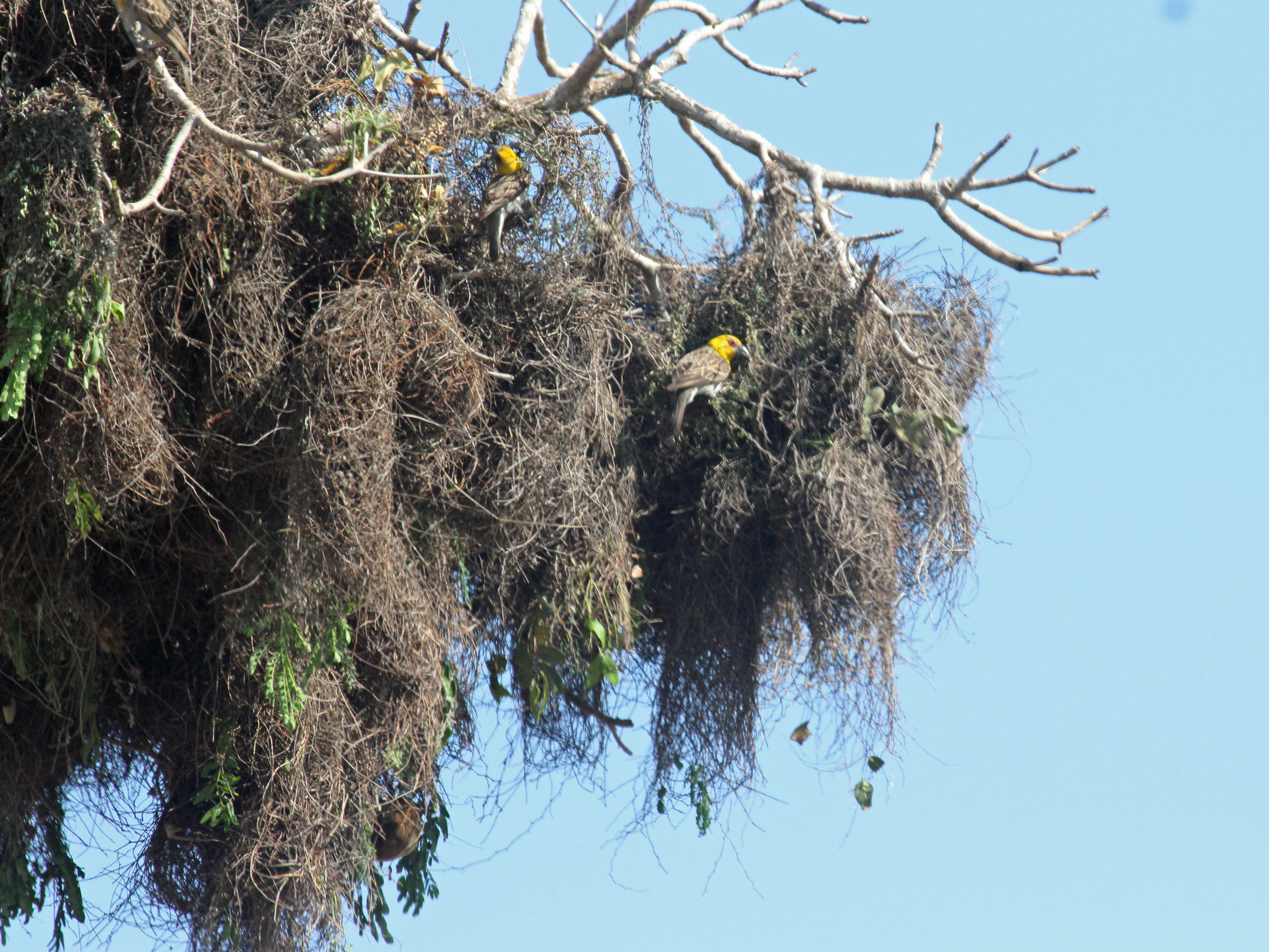
Nests

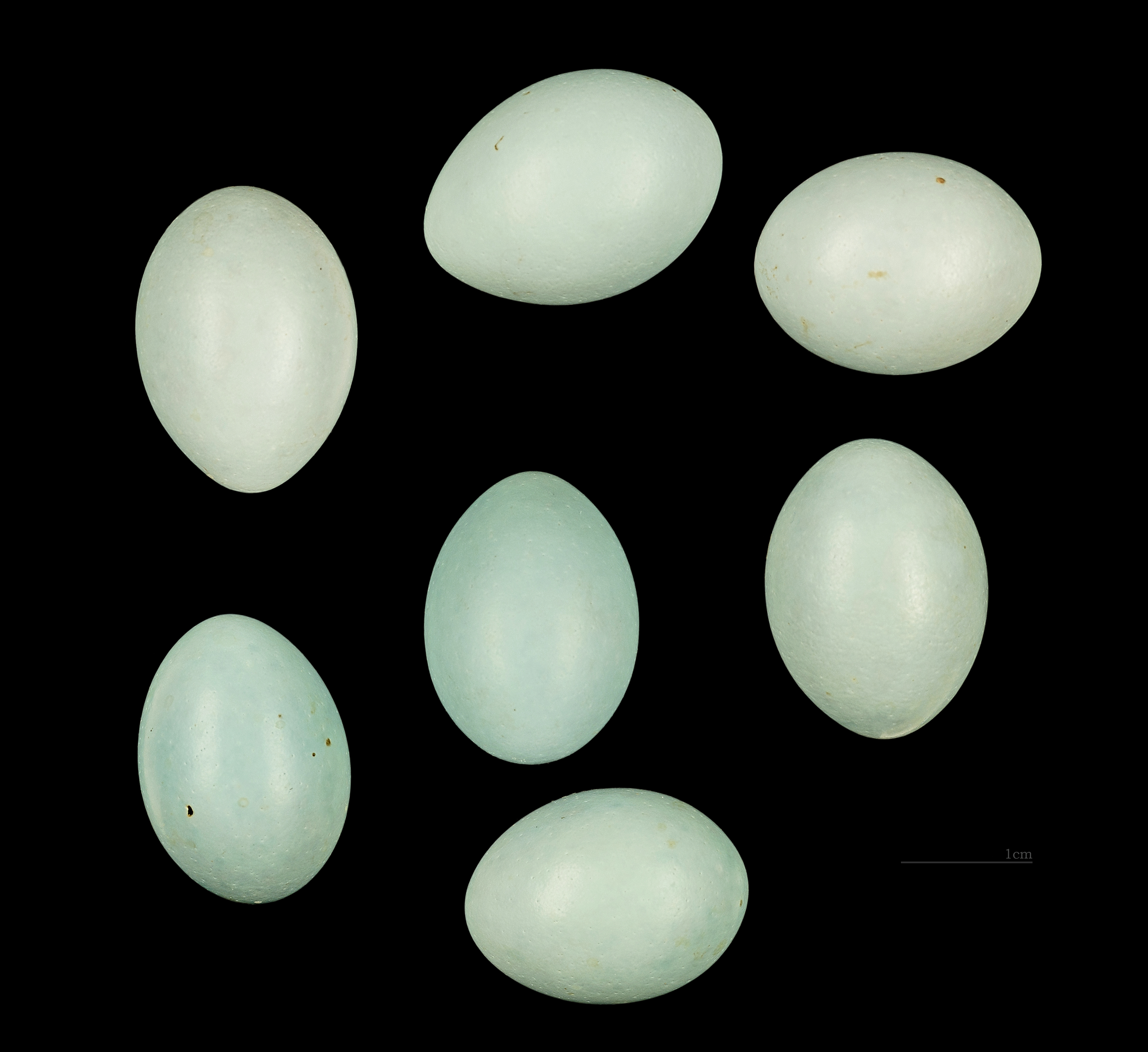
Eggs of Ploceus sakalava MHNT
