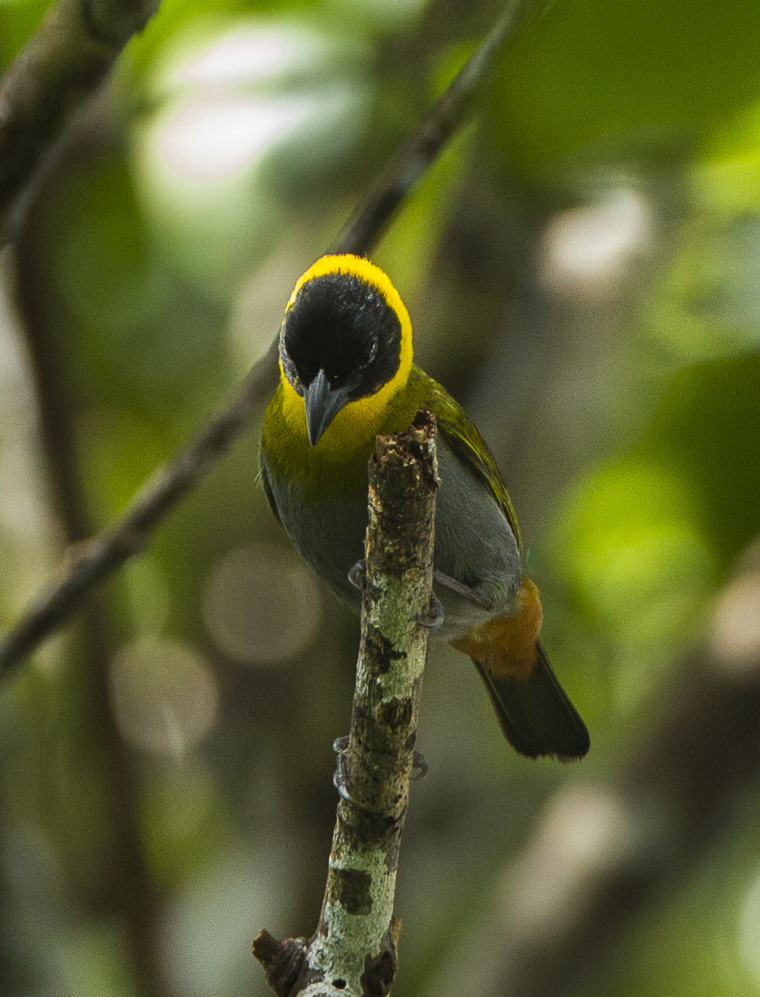

Conservation status
- Least Concern (IUCN 3.1)

Scientific classification
- Kingdom: Animalia
- Phylum: Chordata
- Class: Aves
- Order: Passeriformes
- Family: Ploceidae
- Genus: Ploceus
- Species: P. nelicourvi

Binomial name
- Ploceus nelicourvi (Scopoli, 1786)

Synonyms
- Parvus [Parus] nelicourvi, Nelicurvius nelicourvi; Loxia pensilis, Ploceus pensilis

= Nelicourvi weaver =

Species of bird

The nelicourvi weaver (Ploceus nelicourvi) is a species of bird in the family Ploceidae. It is endemic to Madagascar. Together with its closest relative, the sakalava weaver, it is sometimes placed in a separate genus Nelicurvius. A slender, sparrow-like bird, it is 15 cm (5.9 in) long and weighing 20–28 g (0.71–0.99 oz). Breeding males have a black bill and head, brown eyes, yellow collar, grey belly, chestnut-brown lower tail coverts, olive back, and blackish flight feathers edged greenish. Non-breeding males have mottled grey and green heads. In the breeding female the front of the head is yellow and the back olive green, with a broad yellow eyebrow. It builds solitary, roofed, retort-shaped nests, hanging by a rope from a branch, vine or bamboo stem, in an open space. It primarily feeds on insects, looking on its own or in very small groups, often together with long-billed bernieria. Its natural habitat is subtropical or tropical moist lowland and mountain forests. The conservation status of Nelicourvi weaver is least concern according to the IUCN Red List.

== Taxonomy ==
The nelicourvi weaver was first described by Italian naturalist and physician Giovanni Antonio Scopoli in 1786, who called it Parvus nelicourvi. The description was based on a specimen that Pierre Sonnerat, a French naturalist and explorer, had collected during his 1770 visit of Madagascar, on the eastern coast, possibly near Fort Dauphin. In 1789, Johann Friedrich Gmelin, a naturalist from Germany, gave the name Loxia pensilis, based on a description by English ornithologist John Latham, who himself had not provided a binomial name. In 1827, George Shaw, an English zoologist and botanist, included L. pensilis in the genus Ploceus. In 1850, Charles Lucien Bonaparte assigned the species to his newly erected genus Nelicurvius. No subspecies have been described. The original genus name Parvus is Latin and means "little". It is presumed that the species epithet nelicourvi was derived from the Tamil word "nellukuruvi", a name for a waxbill or finch on Sri Lanka. In 1783, John Latham gave the species its first common name in English, calling it "pensile grosbeak". "Nelicourvi weaver" has been designated the official name by the International Ornithological Committee (IOC). Vernacular names in Malagasi are fodisaina, fodifetsy and farifotramavo.

Based on recent DNA-analysis, the genus Ploceus is almost certainly polyphyletic. If all species currently included in the genus would remain and the genus would be made monophyletic, it would have to encompass the entire subfamily Ploceinae. The Ploceinae can be divided into two groups. In the first group, the widowbirds and bishops (genus Euplectes) are sister to a clade in which the genera Foudia and Quelea are closest relatives and which further includes the Asiatic species of Ploceus, i.e. P. manyar, P. philippinus, P. benghalensis, P. megarhynchus, (and P. hypoxanthus, although untested). Since Georges Cuvier picked P. philippinus as the type species, these five species would logically remain assigned to the genus Ploceus.

Basic to the second group is a clade consisting of both species sofar included in Ploceus that live on Madagascar, P. nelicourvi and P. sakalava, and these are morphologically very distinct from the remaining species. These two species could in future be assigned to the genus Nelicurvius that was erected by Charles Lucien Bonaparte in 1850, but which was merged with Ploceus later on. This second group further contains the genera Malimbus and Anaplectes, and all remaining Ploceus species.

- subfamily Ploceinae
  - - - - "true Ploceus"
          the five Asian species of Ploceus
        - - genus Foudia
          - genus Quelea
      - genus Euplectes
  - - "reinstated Nelicurvius"
      - P. nelicourvi
      - P. sakalava
    - "extended Malimbus"
      all mainland African species of "Ploceus", Malimbus and Anaplectes

== Description ==
The nelicourvi weaver is a slender sparrow-like bird of 15 cm (5.9 in) long and weighing 20–28 g (0.71–0.99 oz). During the breeding period, the male has a black beak, (reddish) brown eyes and blackish to brownish grey legs. His head is black, including the cheeks, around the ears, the forehead, crown and nape. The black is surrounded by a broad yellow collar, that includes chin, breast, side and back of the neck. The yellow collar is on the other side bordered by a vaguely defined olive-green band. The lower chest and belly are bluish-grey, the lower flanks grey with a greenish hue. The wing flight feathers are blackish, with those near the wing tips with narrow greenish yellow edges and those more to the base with broad olive-green edges. The alula and primary coverts are blackish, while all other coverts are bright olive green. The underside of the wing consists of light grey feathers with a yellowish tinge. The shoulders, and upper tailbase are also bright olive-green, the under tailbase chestnut-colored, while the tail flight feathers are blackish with wide olive-green. The non-breeding plumage differs in the black of the head which turns olive green, mottled with dark grey, and the presence of a narrow yellow brow.

The front of the head of the female in breeding plumage is yellow, gradually changing to olive green at the back of the head, except for the broad yellow rear brow, while the area between the eye and the bill is dark greenish grey, and the area around the ear is green. The head is surrounded by a broad yellow collar that includes the chin. The remainder of the female breeding plumage is identical to the male's.

The nelicourvi weaver can be distinguished from the related sakalava weaver, which has streaked plumage. The somewhat related forest fody and Madagascar fody mostly have streaked upperparts and scarlet as the most obvious colour.

=== Sound ===
The usual call of the nelicourvi weaver is a high-pitched, very distinct chizz-chizz-chizz, which is more metallical and rasping when the birds are in feeding groups. Other calls that can be heard when the birds are at the nest include tsrrreee, tiang-tiang, and chet. The song, which is produced while being at the nest sounds like chiz-chizz-chswriissssiszz.

== Distribution and habitat ==
The nelicourvi weaver is an endemic species of Madagascar. It occurs along the entire belt of rainforest that stretches from the Tsanatanana mountains in the North to the South-East. It also is present in the litoral forest of the eastern coast, almost but not quite reaching Tôlanaro (Fort-Dauphin of old) in the South-East. It can be found from sea level to mostly around 1,500 m (4,900 ft) altitude, but is also present up to 2,100 m (6,900 ft) high in Marojejy National Park. In the far North, an isolated population exists at the Amber Mountain National Park. It mostly lives in moist mountain and lowland forest, but is also present in sclerophyllous mountain forests, bushland and thickets.

== Ecology and behaviour ==
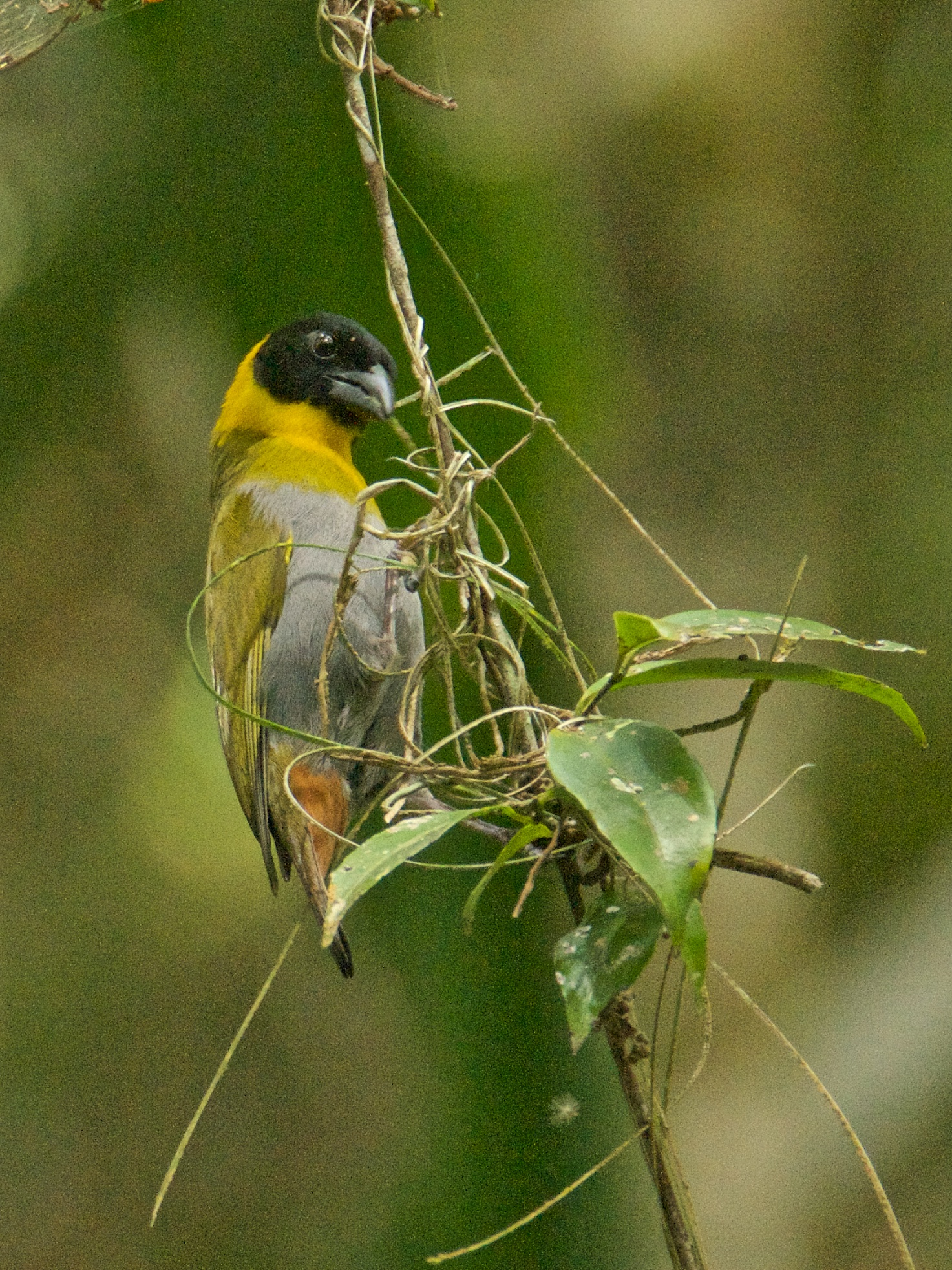
male in the initial stage of nest building

Birds roam from the forest floor to the canopy, but particularly favour the middle story. They mostly operate alone, in pairs or groups of three, and can also be found mixing with long-billed bernierias. Larger flocks do not occur. The nelicourvi weaver is an agile, active species that generally makes a lot of noise. It searches for insects on leaves, and branches, while hanging from vines and twigs. It looks for animals in rolled leaves such as wild ginger Aframomum and along leaf litter, probing crevices, and opening dead stems. It also dismembers flowers to reach the nectar. Mostly, arthropods (beetles, bugs, butterflies, caterpillars, dragonflies, flies, grasshoppers, leafhoppers, stick insects, millipedes and spiders) are consumed, sometimes small vertebrates (lizards and chameleons), next to some nectar, fruit and probably seeds.

=== Reproduction ===
The species is apparently monogamous, having long-term relationships. Nests are built distanced from other nests. Although occasionally two nests are within a few meters, colonies do not occur. Males display during the breeding season, while seated on a horizontal branch, with fluttering wings helt low while calling loudly. Mating starts during the sixth day of nest building. The male chases away other birds from the nest, possibly to forestall the deposition of eggs by other couples or cuckoos. Eggs usually are produced between October and March, corresponding to the late dry season and raining season. Nest building may occur as early as August and does not always signal imminent breeding attempts. Nests are conspicuous, usually in the open and away from surrounding vegetation, attached from an often defoliated limb, bamboo stem or vine, hanging above a clearing or a stream at a height of 2–8 m (6.6–26.2 ft). The nest is attached to its hold by a 10–30 cm (0.3–1 ft) long rope. It is shaped like a retort, having an oval nesting chamber 12–22 cm (4.7–8.7 in) high and 10–18 cm (3.9–7.1 in) in diameter and a vertical entrance hose is attached high up a side and is at least as long as the nest is high. It is a firm construction made from strips of grass, sedge, and palm fronds, with a thin lining of palm fibres at the bottom of the nesting chamber. The male constructs the structure of the nest while the female brings lining material. The total time used to construct the nest is approximately twelve days. A clutch consists of one to four (most often three) oval, smooth, somewhat shiny, variably pale blue-green eggs of about 20½ mm (0.8 in) long and 15 mm (0.6 in) in diameter. The eggs are incubated only by the female for fifteen days before hatching. The male lacks brood patches. Both parents feed the chicks and remove fecal sacs.

=== Predation ===
Eggs sometimes fall prey to brown lemurs (Eulemur fulvus), and nest are raided by Madagascar harrier-hawks (Polyboroides radiatus). In the daytime, birds may be taken by banded kestrels (Falco zoniventris), while at night they are at risk of being captured by barn owls (Tyto alba).
