= Red weaver =

Conservation status
- Least Concern (IUCN 3.1)

Scientific classification
- Kingdom: Animalia
- Phylum: Chordata
- Class: Aves
- Order: Passeriformes
- Family: Ploceidae
- Genus: Anaplectes
- Species: A. jubaensis

Binomial name
- Anaplectes jubaensis Van Someren, 1920

Species of bird

The red weaver (Anaplectes jubaensis) is a species of bird in the weaver family Ploceidae. It is found in southern Somalia and northeastern Kenya.

This species was formerly considered as a subspecies of the red-headed weaver (Anaplectes rubriceps). It was split from the red-headed weaver based on its distinctive plumage.

In March 2025, the species was added to a list made by Search for Lost Birds, an organisation aimed at rediscovering bird species not seen in the last 10 years or more, along with the Ogea monarch, Luzon rail, Chestnut-shouldered goshawk, Blue-fronted lorikeet, Paria barbtail, Broad-billed fairywren (Rediscovered in 2025), Sulu cuckooshrike (Last seen in 2008), Rusty lark (Last seen in 1931), Bismarck island thrush (Last seen in 1994), and the Sulu jungle flycatcher (Last seen in 1997).

Six (three adult males, an immature male, and two females) were found in a search of a remote area of northeastern Kenya close to the Somali border on 3 July 2026.
