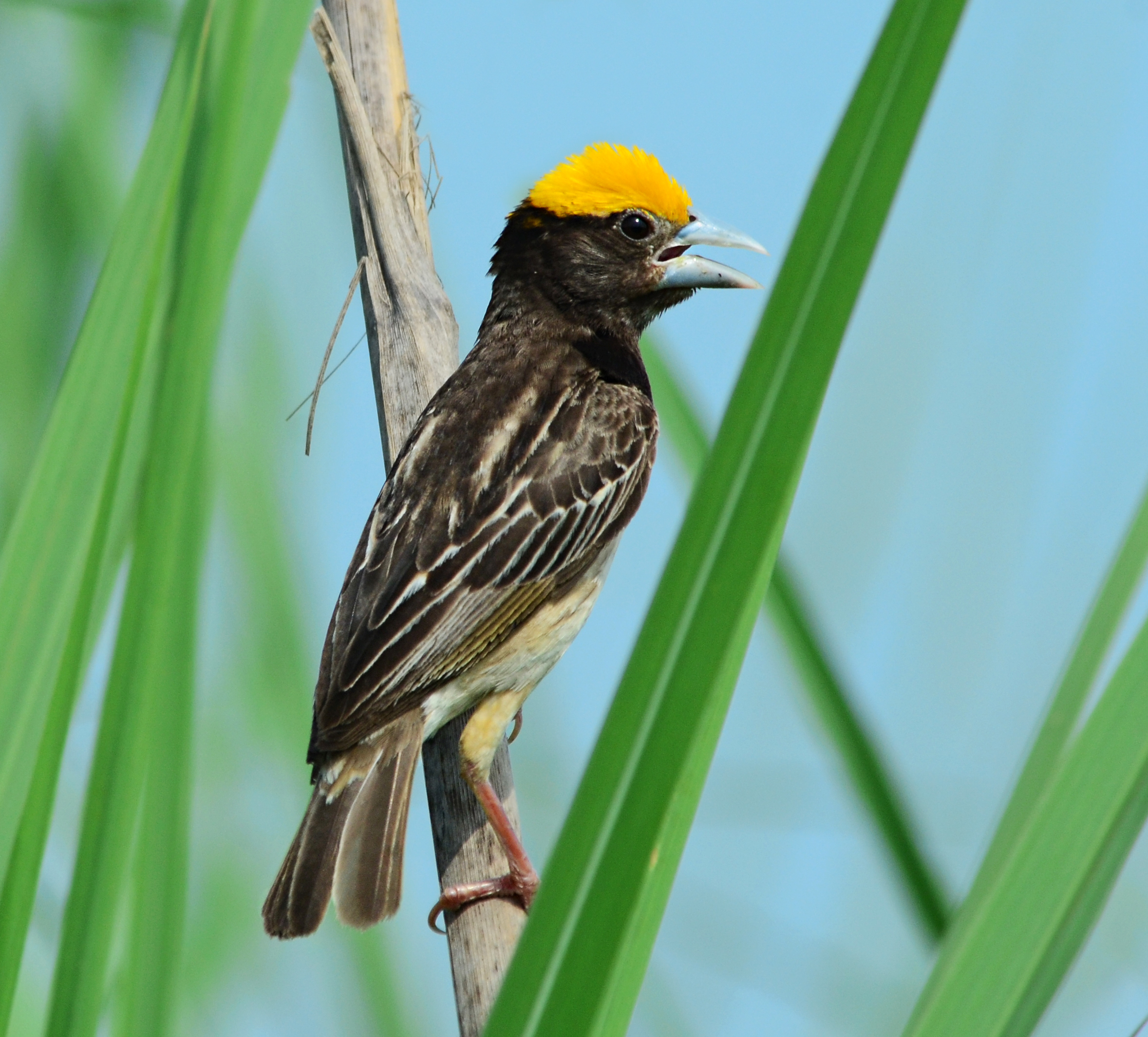
- Breeding male in northern India
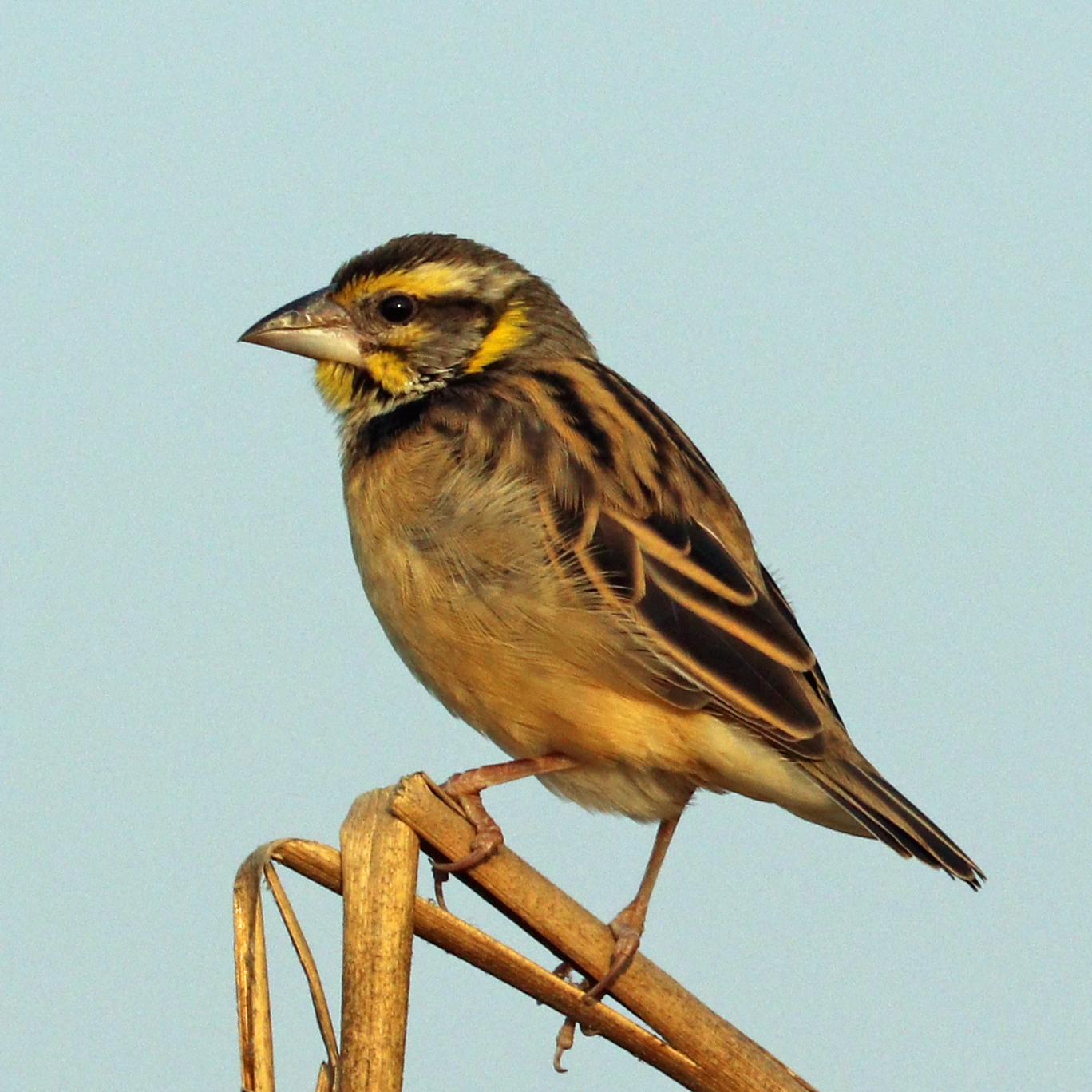
- Female or non-breeding male in Uttar Pradesh, India

Conservation status
- Least Concern (IUCN 3.1)

Scientific classification
- Kingdom: Animalia
- Phylum: Chordata
- Class: Aves
- Order: Passeriformes
- Family: Ploceidae
- Genus: Ploceus
- Species: P. benghalensis

Binomial name
- Ploceus benghalensis (Linnaeus, 1758)

Synonyms
- Loxia benghalensis Linnaeus, 1758

= Black-breasted weaver =

Species of bird

The black-breasted weaver (Ploceus benghalensis), also known as the Bengal weaver or black-throated weaver, is a weaver resident in the northern river plains of the Indian subcontinent. Like the other weavers, the males build an enclosed nest from reeds and mud, and visiting females select a mate at least partially based on the quality of the nest.

== Taxonomy ==
The black-breasted weaver was formally described in 1758 by the Swedish naturalist Carl Linnaeus in the tenth edition of his Systema Naturae. He placed it with the crossbills in the genus Loxia and coined the binomial name Loxia benghalensis. Linnaeus based his account on two earlier descriptions and hand-coloured illustrations by English naturalists. In 1734 Eleazar Albin had included the "Bengal sparrow" in his A Natural History of Birds, while in 1751 George Edwards had included the "yellow-headed Indian sparrow" in his A Natural History of Uncommon Birds. Both authors had access to specimens owned by the silk-pattern designer Joseph Dandridge that had been collected in Bengal. The black-breasted weaver is now one of 67 species placed in the genus Ploceus that was introduced by the French naturalist Georges Cuvier in 1816. The species is monotypic: no subspecies are recognised.

== Description ==
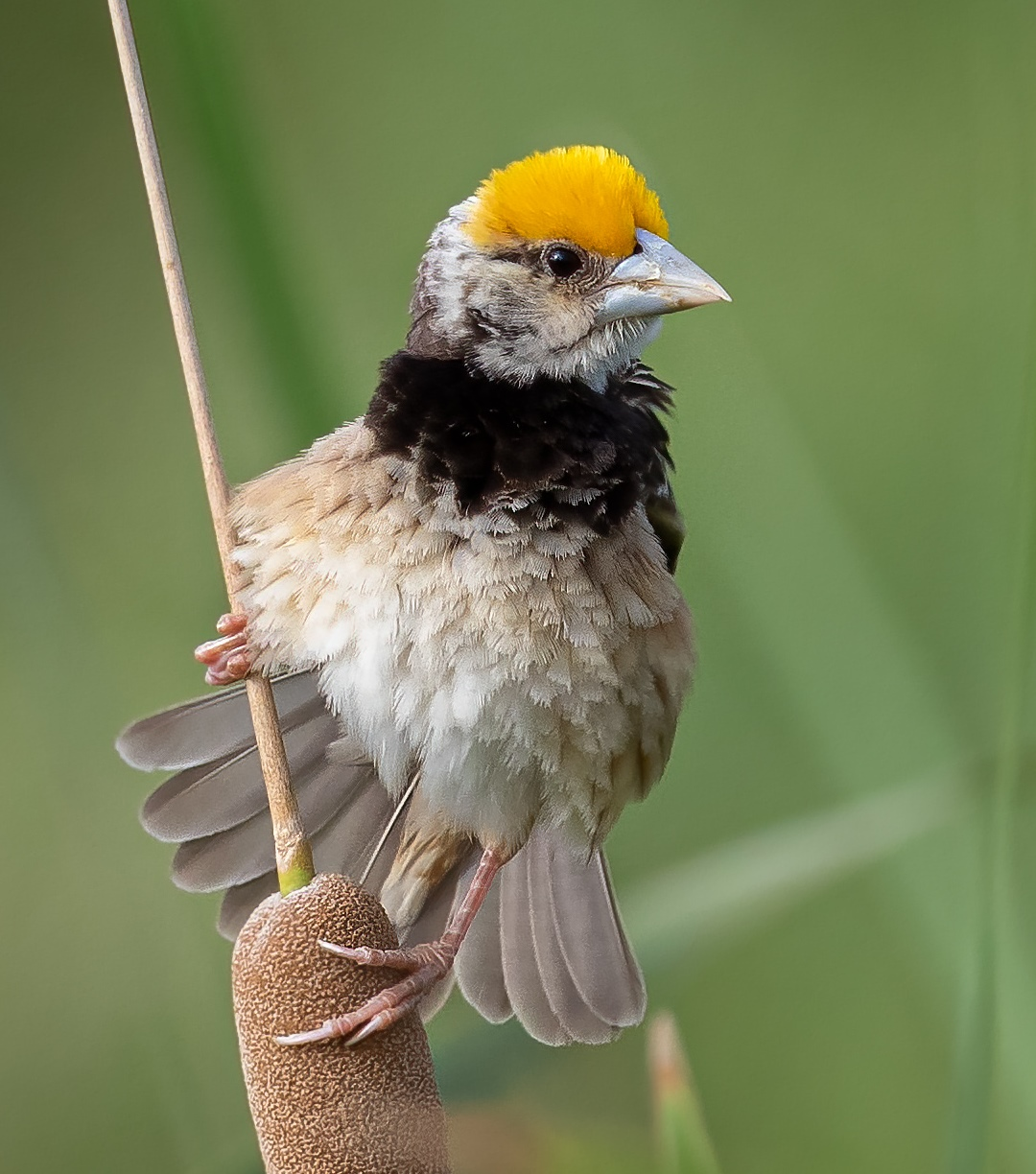
A breeding male with buffy-white face and nape, on the shore of a reservoir in central India

The black-breasted weaver is sparrow-sized with a total body length of about 15 cm. The male in breeding plumage has a brilliant golden-yellow crown and a variable amount of black on the head and breast; some males have an entirely black head (apart from the yellow crown) and breast, while others have a whitish throat or an entirely buffy-white face with a black band separating it from the fulvous-white underparts. In the non-breeding male and female, the crown is brown like the rest of the upperpart plumage, and the black pectoral band is less developed. It has a prominent supercilium, a spot behind ear, and narrow moustachial streaks, which are pale yellow. Flocks frequent cultivation and the reedy margins of tanks and jheels (shallow lakes), or extensive tall grass areas.

== Distribution ==
Resident or local migrant, endemic to South Asia. Species is described as 'common' in at least parts of its range. It is found throughout northern part of Indian subcontinent, with small populations in the Peninsular region. Local names include Hindi: Sarbo baya, and Bengali: কালোবুক বাবুই (Kalo-buk babui), বাংলা বাবুই (Bangla babui), শর বাজা (Shor baJa) or কান্তাওয়ালা বায়া (Kantawala baya).

== Behaviour ==
It is polygynous and colonial, and on the whole similar to that of the baya and streaked weavers.

=== Breeding ===
Breeding takes place between June and September. Nests are in scattered groups of 4 or 5; sometimes larger colonies. The male constructs the nest single-handedly, with a group of females visiting it during late construction stage, jumping on the helmets, tugging and testing, presumably for strength. If a female appears interested, the male bows low before her, presenting his golden crown to her. He flaps his wings deliberately and sings softly tsi-tsisik-tsisik-tsik-tsik, like the chirp of a cricket or the subdued squeaking of an unoiled bicycle wheel. Once the female agrees and permits copulation, he quickly completes the rest of the nest, and she lays her eggs inside. He immediately commences a second nest nearby to attract other females, and occasionally a third nest, or very rarely a fourth. Nests not accepted by females may be torn down by the builder himself.

The nest is similar to that of the streaked weaver; somewhat smaller and normally with shorter entrance tubes. Built in reed-beds in marsh, often moonj or kans (Saccharum spontaneum), with some of the growing reeds incorporated into the dome as support. Entrance tube is somewhat shorter than Baya weavers (up to about 25 cm). At the 'helmet' stage of construction a quantity of wet mud or cowdung is daubed thickly along the edge, with bright coloured scarlet or orange flowers or flower petals (Lantana, Lagerstroemia) incorporated; observations suggest that this is part of the courtship rituals and exercise a direct influence on the reactions of the visiting female, both for this species and the streaked weaver. The clutch is 3 or 4 white eggs.

== Gallery ==
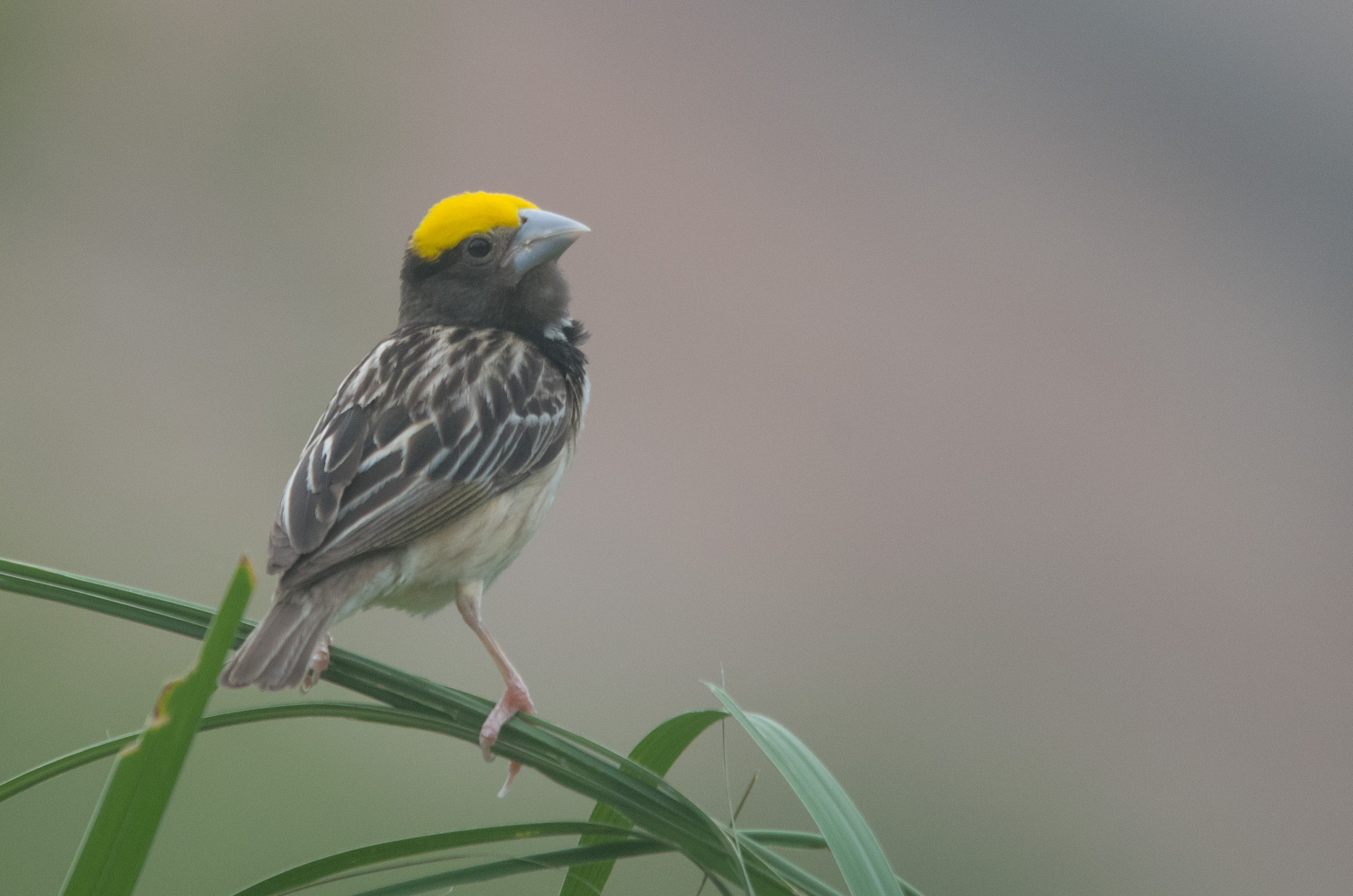
Male in breeding dress at Pali, Rajasthan

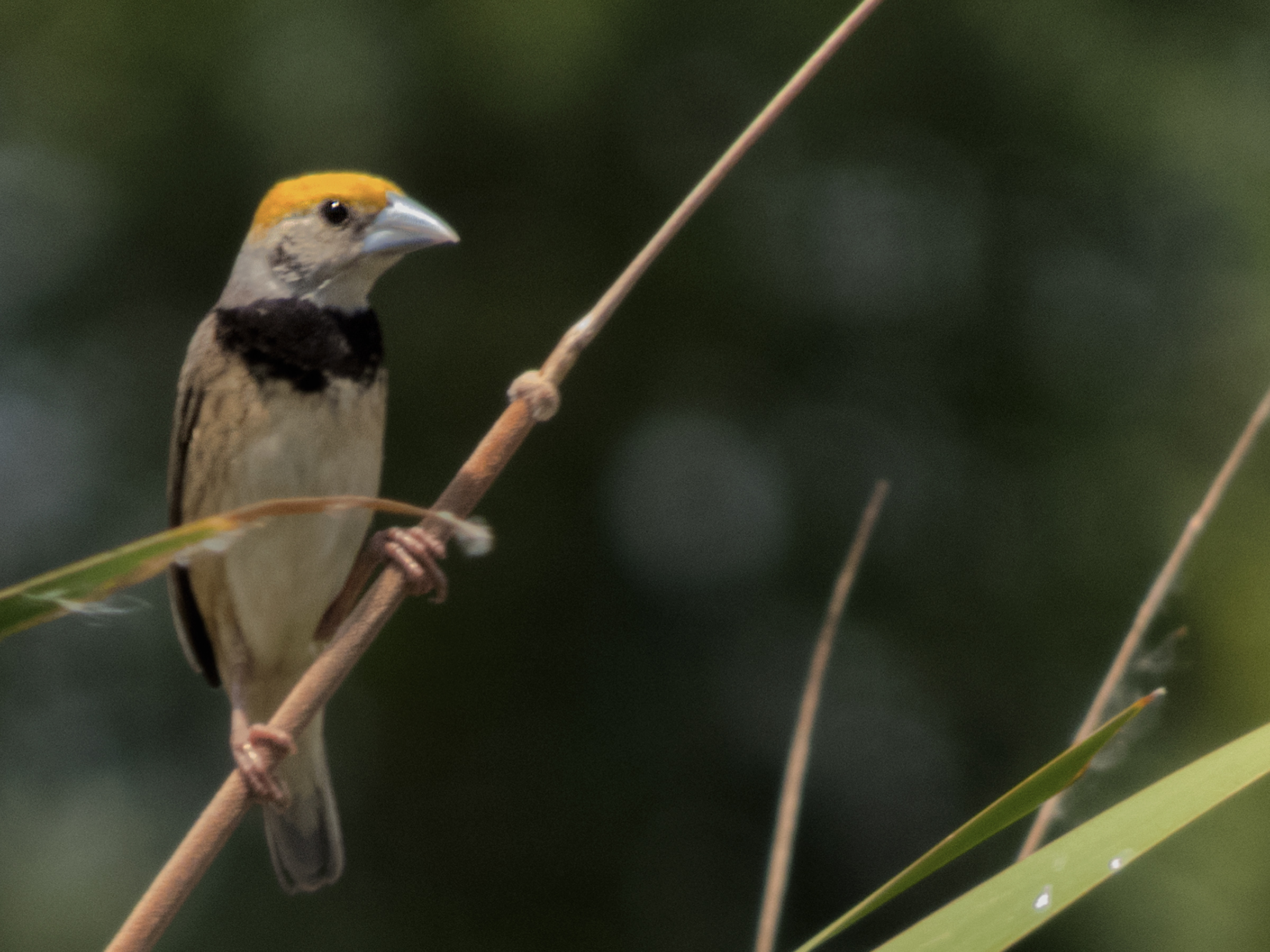
Male in breeding plumage in South India

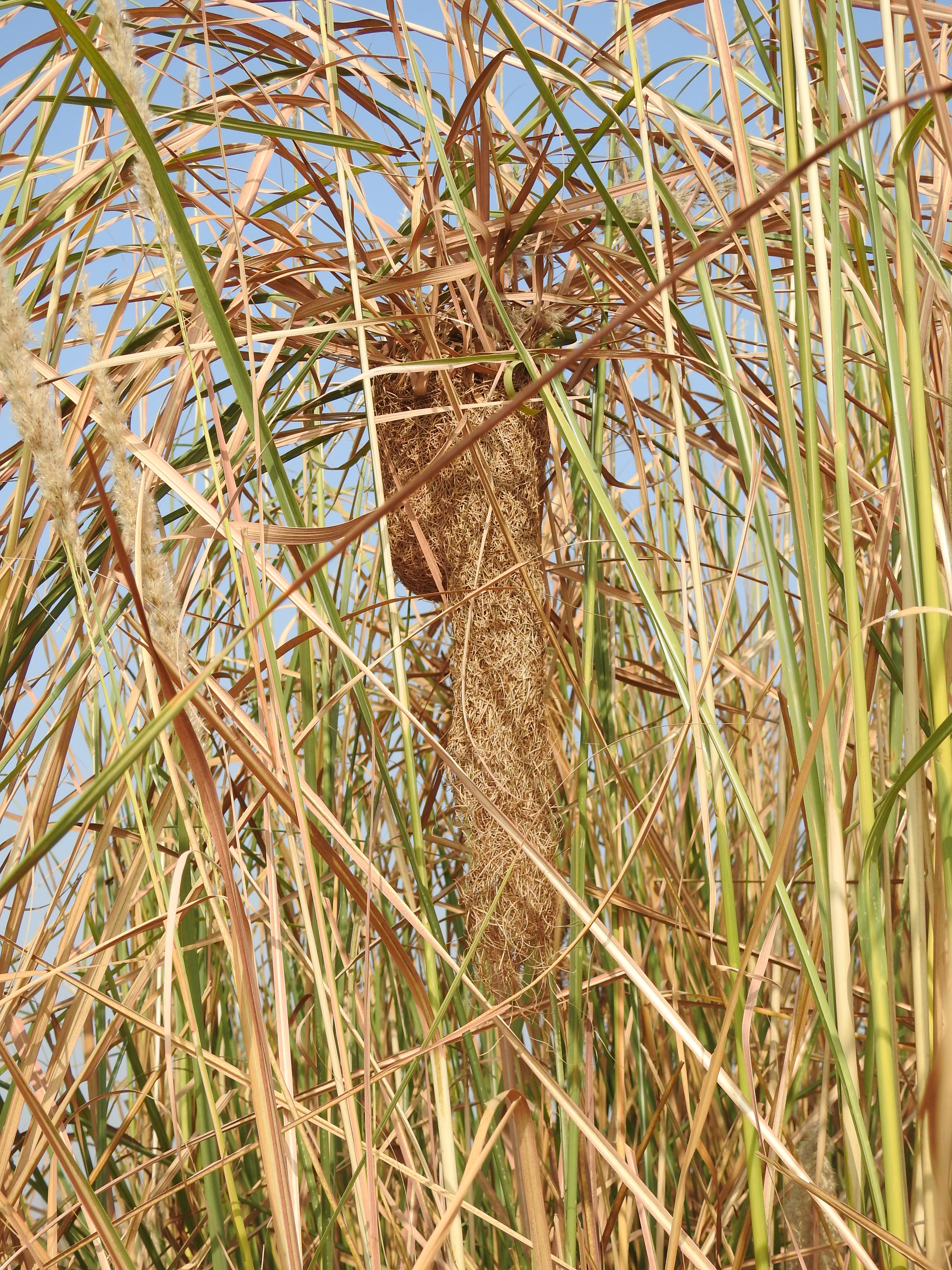
Nest suspended from grass, India
