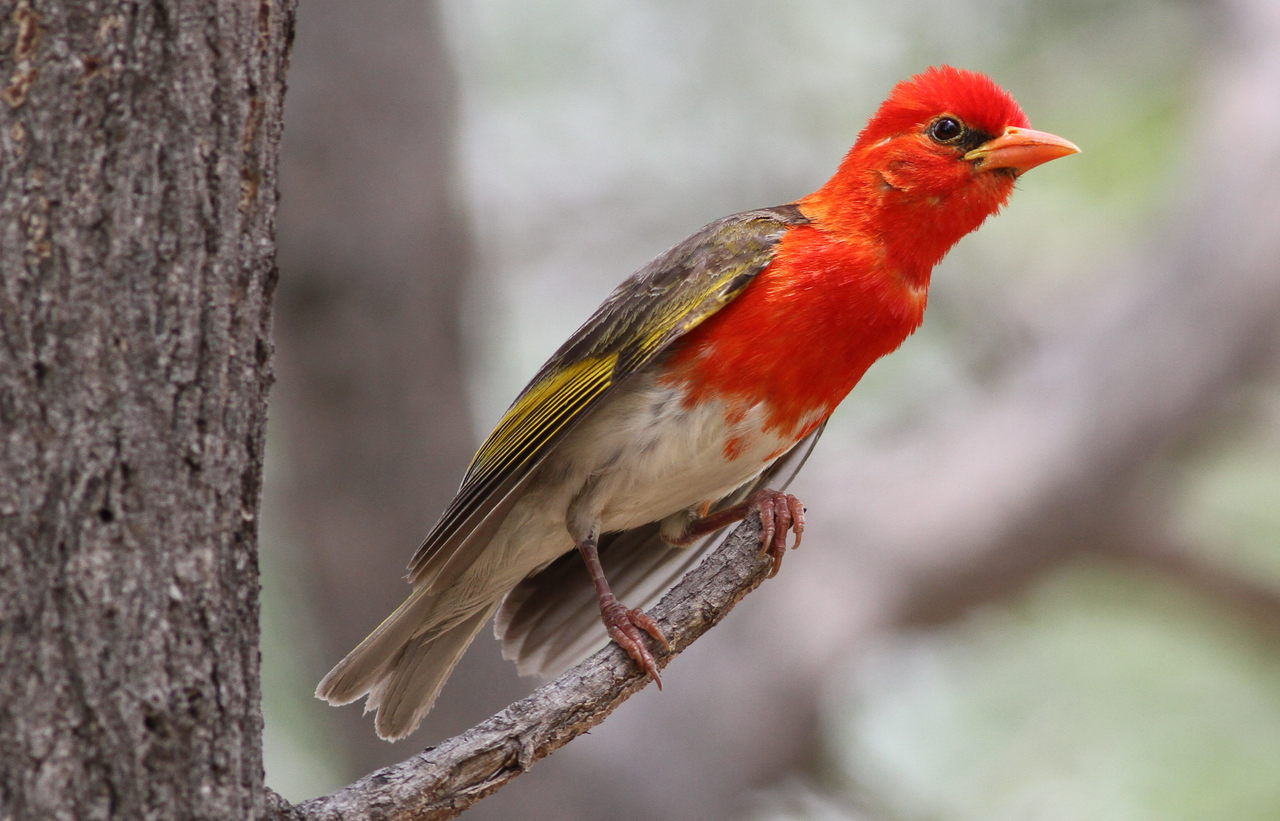
- Male

Conservation status
- Least Concern (IUCN 3.1)

Scientific classification
- Kingdom: Animalia
- Phylum: Chordata
- Class: Aves
- Order: Passeriformes
- Family: Ploceidae
- Genus: Anaplectes
- Species: A. rubriceps

Binomial name
- Anaplectes rubriceps (Sundevall, 1850)

= Red-headed weaver =

Species of bird

The red-headed weaver (Anaplectes rubriceps) (Note: Ploceus melanotis, described by Lafresnaye (1839) from two Senegalese specimens is invalid as the name was preoccupied. Sundevall utilized a specimen obtained by Wahlberg in November 1843 at Mohapoani (i.e. Witfonteinrant near Thabazimbi). cf Oschadleus (2009)) is a species of bird in the family Ploceidae. It is placed in the monotypic genus Anaplectes and is found throughout the Afrotropics.

The red-headed weaver (Anaplectes rubriceps) is a bird commonly found in eastern and southern Africa in countries such as Zambia, Zimbabwe and most of Mozambique and Botswana. They frequent savanna biomes as well as bushland and other wooded areas. At this time the species trend is stable and the population is concentrated and not fragmented into different regions.

== Characteristics ==
The red-headed weaver is typically found with a white belly and brown wings. The northern male red-headed weavers commonly have a distinct red head that sticks out to the females of the species. The northern females have a more brown head that doesn't stick out as much, while the southern females are found with yellow heads and yellow accents on their wings. All red-headed weavers are found with a moderately long and pointed beak and short strong claws. A typical red-headed weaver flock tends to usually have one male who stays with a pack of eight or nine females. Their nest is usually made of dry sticks that they have collected; it is usually suspended from a tree and shaped like a raindrop, but in some cases the red-headed weavers put their nest in a man-made structure. A distinct feature of the nest is the long entrance tunnel that is more commonly used with the Malimbus genus.

== Behavior ==
The red-headed weaver searches for insects on leaves and branches either alone or in pairs. It can be found searching for food on leaves and at the tips of branches in bushes, saplings, and both small and large trees. The red-headed weaver usually hangs upside-down and uses its bill to pry open clusters of dead leaves and will probe bark to find insects. It also catches aerial insects such as alate termites and moths, which it beats against a surface until the wings break off. Additionally, it pecks at spider nests to extract prey. It is also known to take some plant material, such as acacia seeds, Premna fruit, and berries of the mistletoes Tapinanthus leendertziae and T. dodoneifolius. In addition, it has been observed feeding on nectar from flowers of various plants, including Bombax costatum, Vitellaria paradoxa, and Carissa edulis. On rare occasions, it has been observed feeding on drying meat hanging in the open air. The stomach contents of this bird have included bugs, beetles, mantids, and alate termites, while spiders and tiny snails have been fed to chicks along with fruit pulp.

== Location distribution ==
The species can be found in a wide range of areas, from Senegambia to Ethiopia and northwest Somalia, and southwards to Mozambique, northern and northeast Namibia, northern and eastern Botswana, Zimbabwe, northeast South Africa, eastern Eswatini, and northeast KwaZulu-Natal.

== Lifespan ==
The oldest documented red-headed Weaver was recorded to live for 9 years and 1 month; however, studies estimate that the maximum lifespan is around 11 years.

== Races ==
There are two races, though some 13 have been suggested. They differ by the colour of the belly, colour of the edges to the primaries, and the presence or absence of a black mask.

- A. r. leuconotos (J. W. von Müller, 1851) – West Africa to northern Malawi
- A. r. rubriceps (Sundevall, 1850) – Southern Africa

A. r. gurneyi from Caconda, Angola, a synonym of the above

== Gallery ==
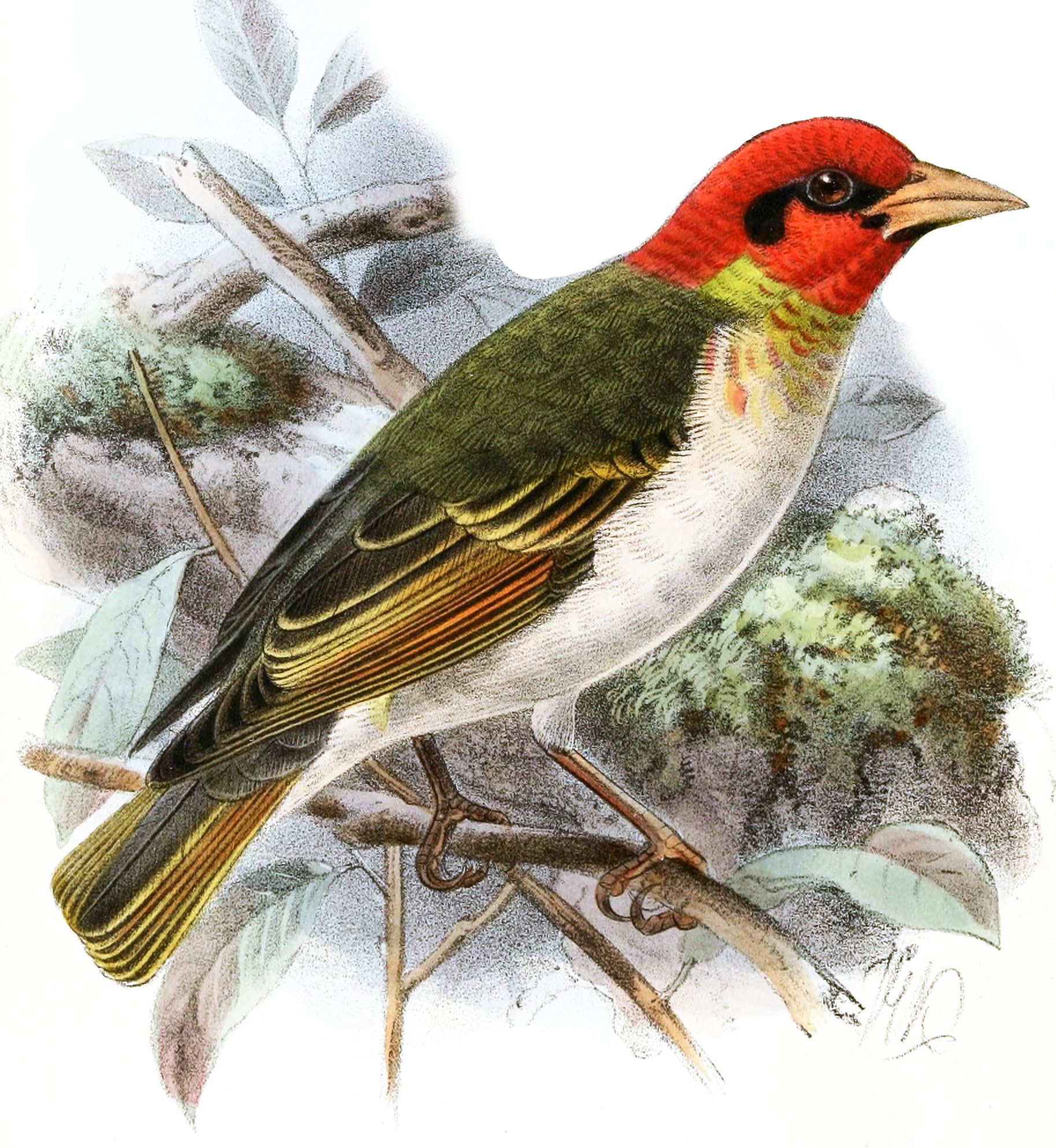
Male A. r. rubriceps from an isolated population
Caconda, Angola, acquiring breeding plumage

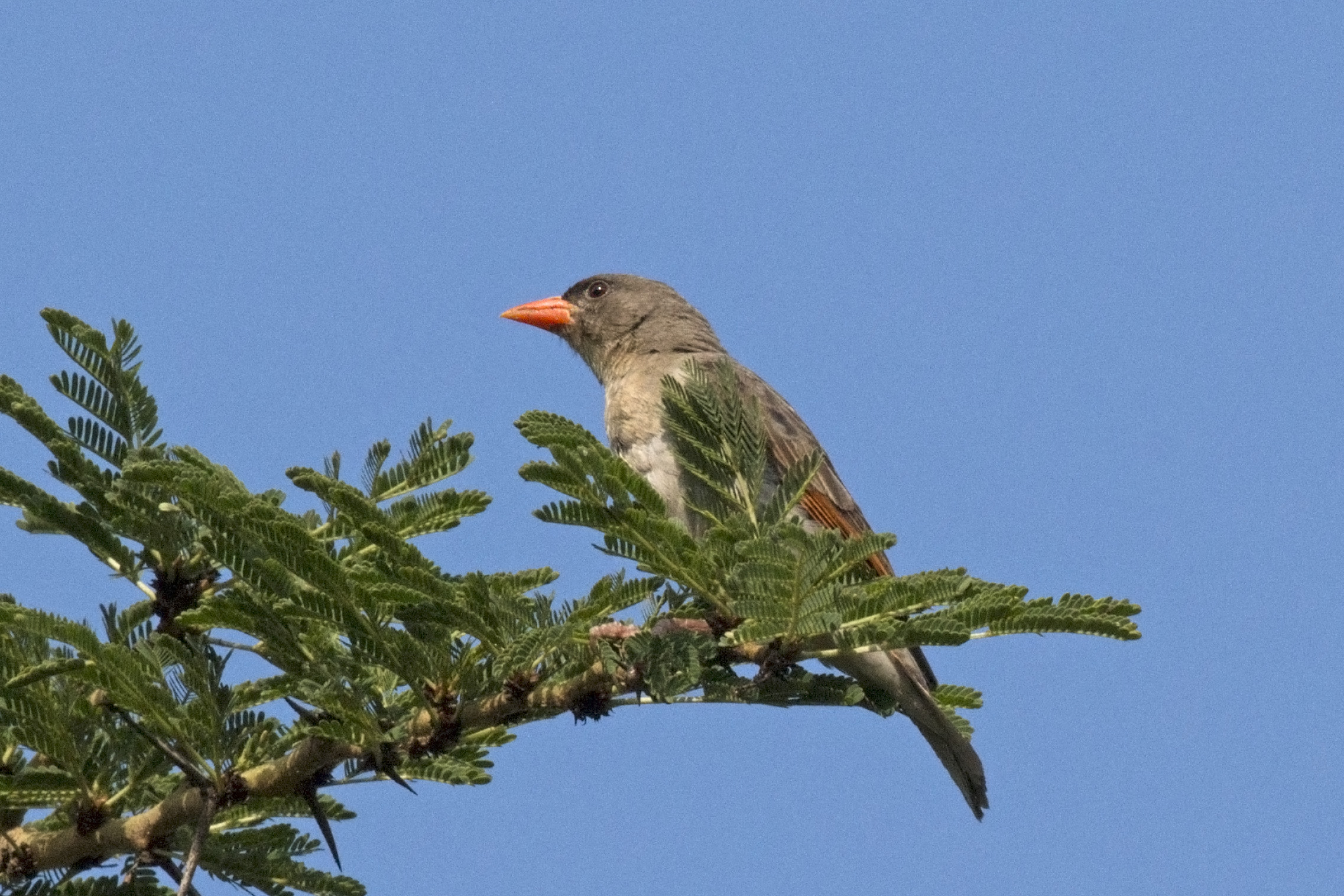
Female A. r. leuconotus
Soysambu Conservancy, Kenya

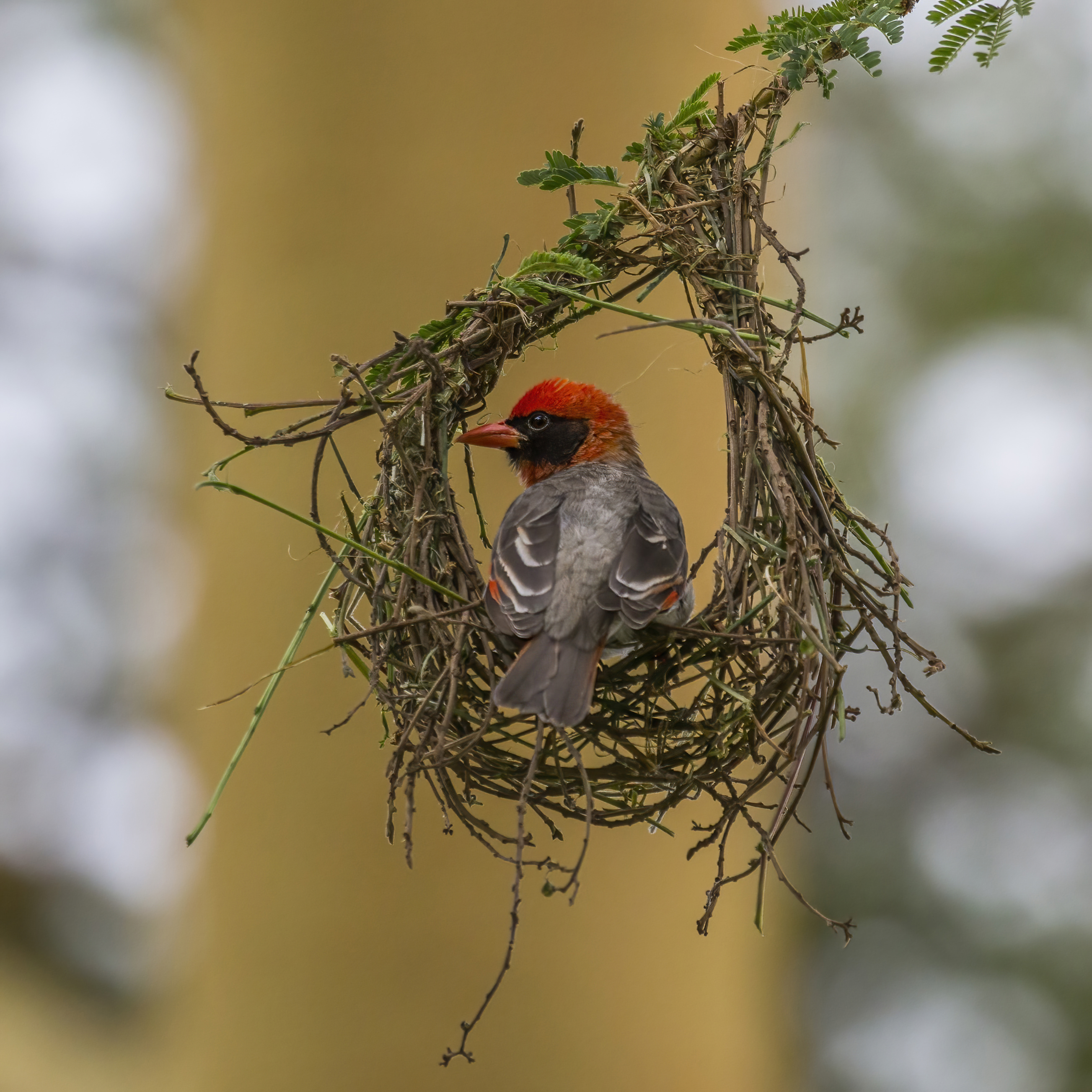
Male A. r. leuconotus building nest
Soysambu Conservancy, Kenya
