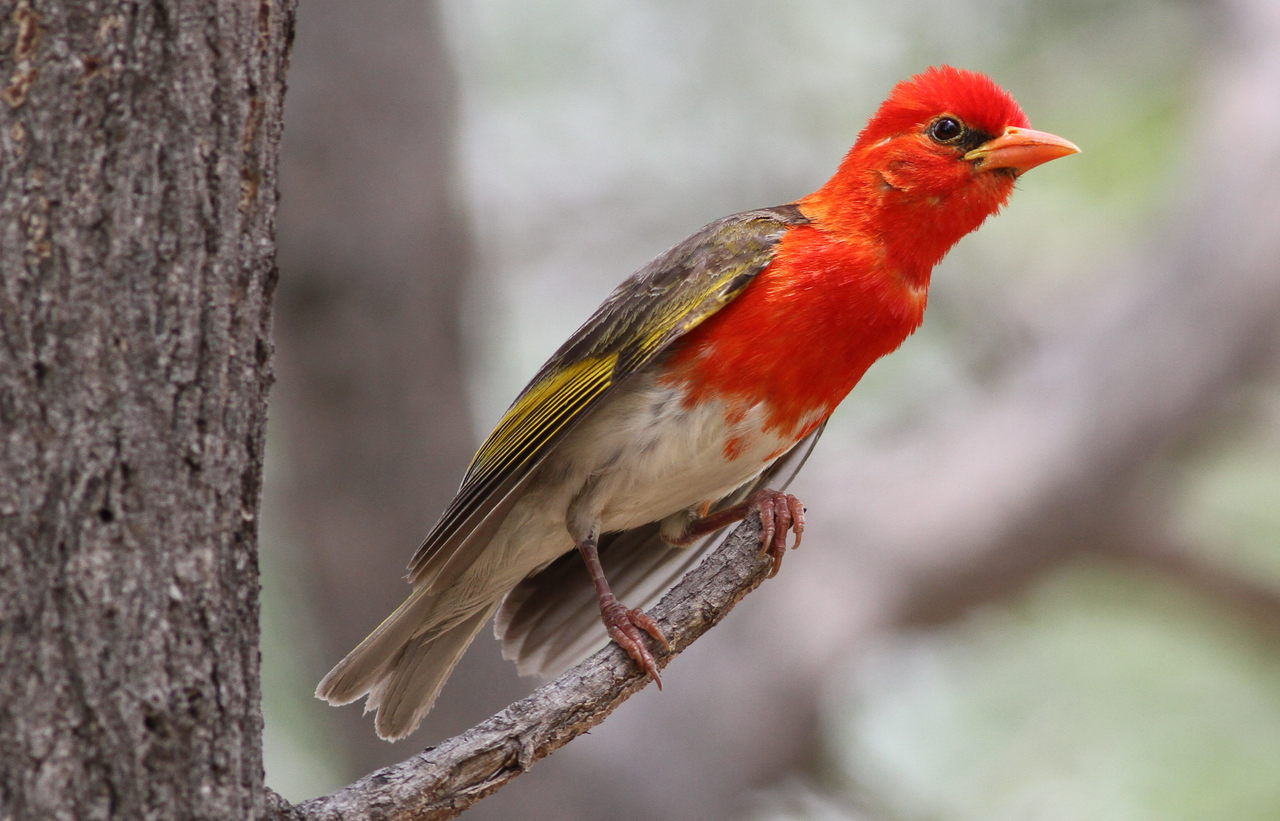
- Male red-headed weaver (Anaplectes rubriceps)

Scientific classification
- Kingdom: Animalia
- Phylum: Chordata
- Class: Aves
- Order: Passeriformes
- Family: Ploceidae
- Genus: Anaplectes; Reichenbach, 1863

Type species
- Ploceus melanotis = Ploceus leuconotus Lafresnaye, 1840

= Anaplectes =

Genus of birds

Anaplectes is a genus of African birds in the weaver family Ploceidae.

== Taxonomy ==
The genus Anaplectes was introduced in 1863 by the German naturalist Ludwig Reichenbach. The type species was subsequently designated by Richard Bowdler Sharpe as Ploceus leuconotus Müller, JW 1851, now a subspecies of the red-headed weaver (Anaplectes rubriceps).

The genus contains the following two species:

Genus Anaplectes – Reichenbach, 1863 – 2 species
Common name	Scientific name and subspecies	Range	Size and ecology	IUCN status and estimated population
Red-headed weaver	Anaplectes rubriceps (Sundevall, 1850) Two subspecies: A. r. leuconotos (J. W. von Müller, 1851): West Africa to northern Malawi; A. r. rubriceps (Sundevall, 1850): Southern Africa	Senegambia to Ethiopia and northwest Somalia, south to Mozambique, northern and northeast Namibia, northern and eastern Botswana, Zimbabwe, northeast South Africa, eastern Eswatini and northeast KwaZulu-Natal	Size: Habitat: Savanna biomes, bushland and other wooded areas Diet: Insects on leaves and branches, alone or in pairs; hangs upside-down, prying open clusters of dead leaves and probing bark; catches aerial insects (alate termites, moths) and pecks at spider nests; also takes acacia seeds, Premna fruit, mistletoe berries and nectar	LC Stable
Red weaver	Anaplectes jubaensis Van Someren, 1920	Southern Somalia and northeastern Kenya	Size: Habitat: Diet:	LC
