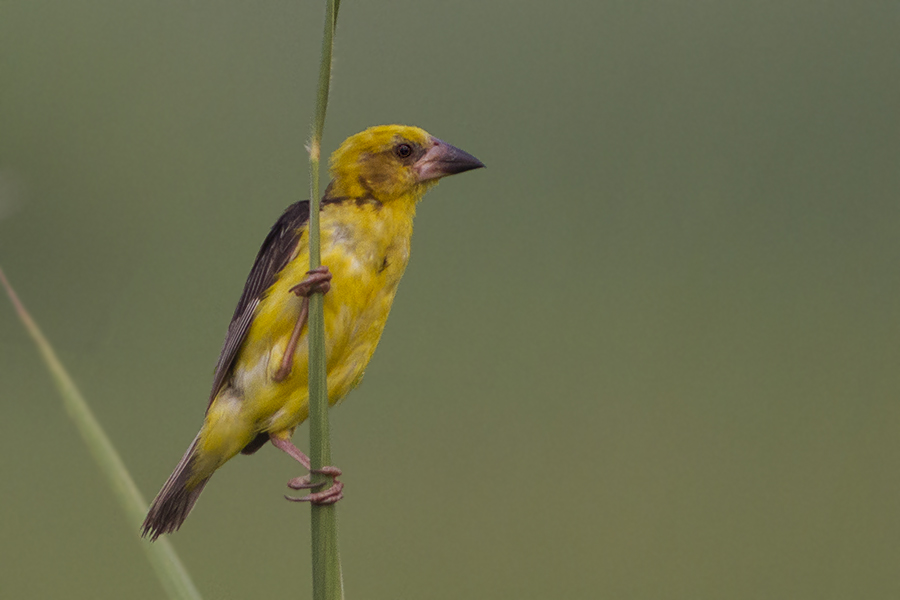
- Male at Baur Reservoir, Uttarakhand

Conservation status
- Endangered (IUCN 3.1)

Scientific classification
- Kingdom: Animalia
- Phylum: Chordata
- Class: Aves
- Order: Passeriformes
- Family: Ploceidae
- Genus: Ploceus
- Species: P. megarhynchus

Binomial name
- Ploceus megarhynchus Hume, 1869

= Finn's weaver =

Species of weaver bird

Finn's weaver (Ploceus megarhynchus), also known as Finn's baya and yellow weaver, is a weaver bird species native to the Ganges and Brahmaputra valleys in India and Nepal. Two subspecies are known; the nominate subspecies occurs in the Kumaon area and salimalii in the eastern Terai.

The species was described and given its binomial name by Allan Octavian Hume based on a specimen obtained at Kaladhungi near Nainital.

== Etymology ==
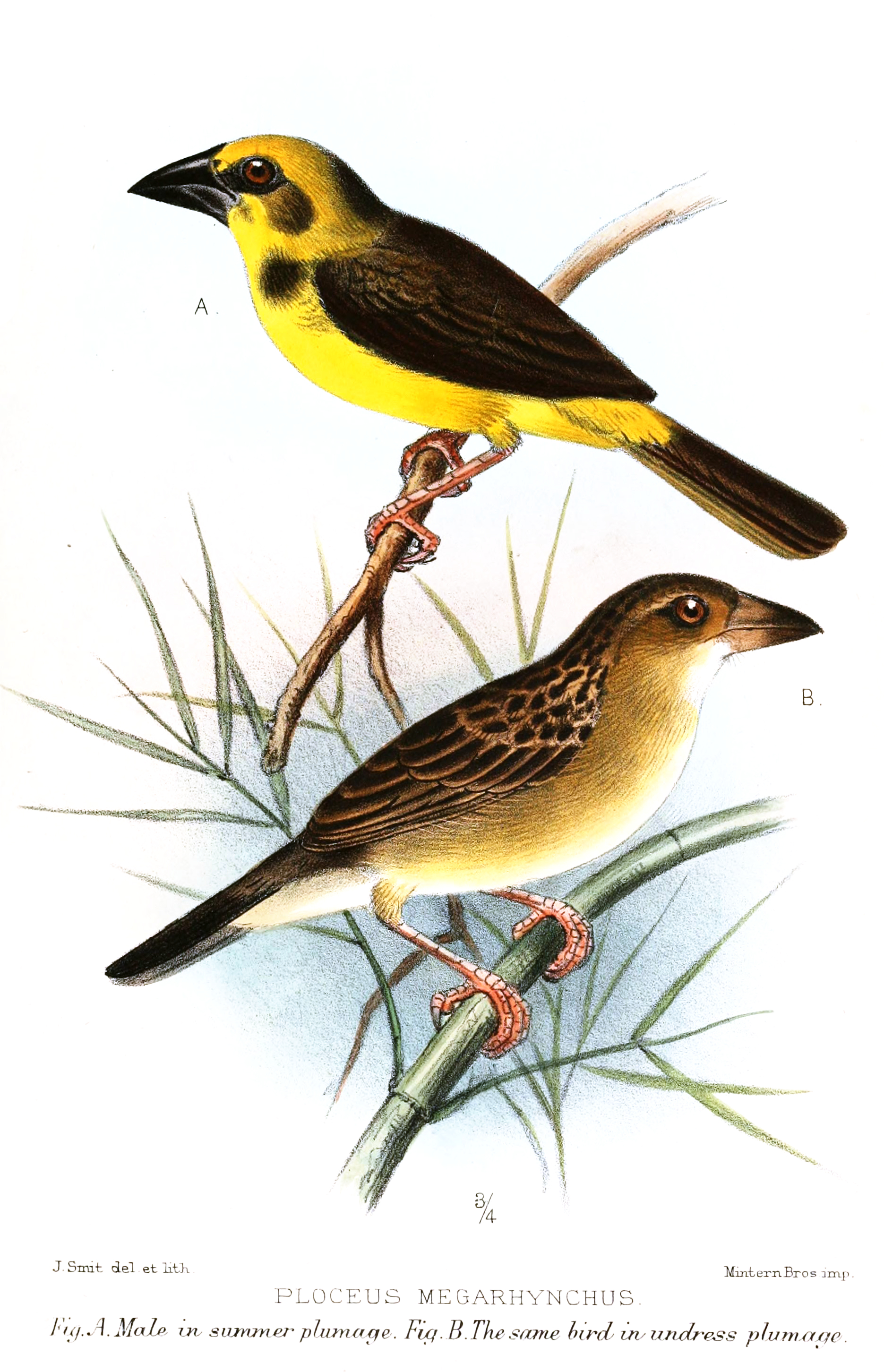
Illustration of Finn's weaver by Joseph Smit (1901)

The species was called "Eastern baya" by Oates in 1889 and called Finn's baya after Frank Finn by E. C. Stuart Baker in 1925.

== Distribution and habitat ==
Finn's weaver was first observed in Shuklaphanta National Park in May 1996 and is a regular summer visitor.

== Behaviour and ecology ==
Finn's weaver breeds from May to September. It builds a nest on top of trees or in reeds. The nest is different in structure from the other weaver species found in India, but as in other weavers, woven from thin strips of leaves and reeds. This species lines the entire inside of the nest, unlike the other weavers, which line only the floor of the nest. Males strip the leaves of the nest tree, making the globular nests clearly visible.
