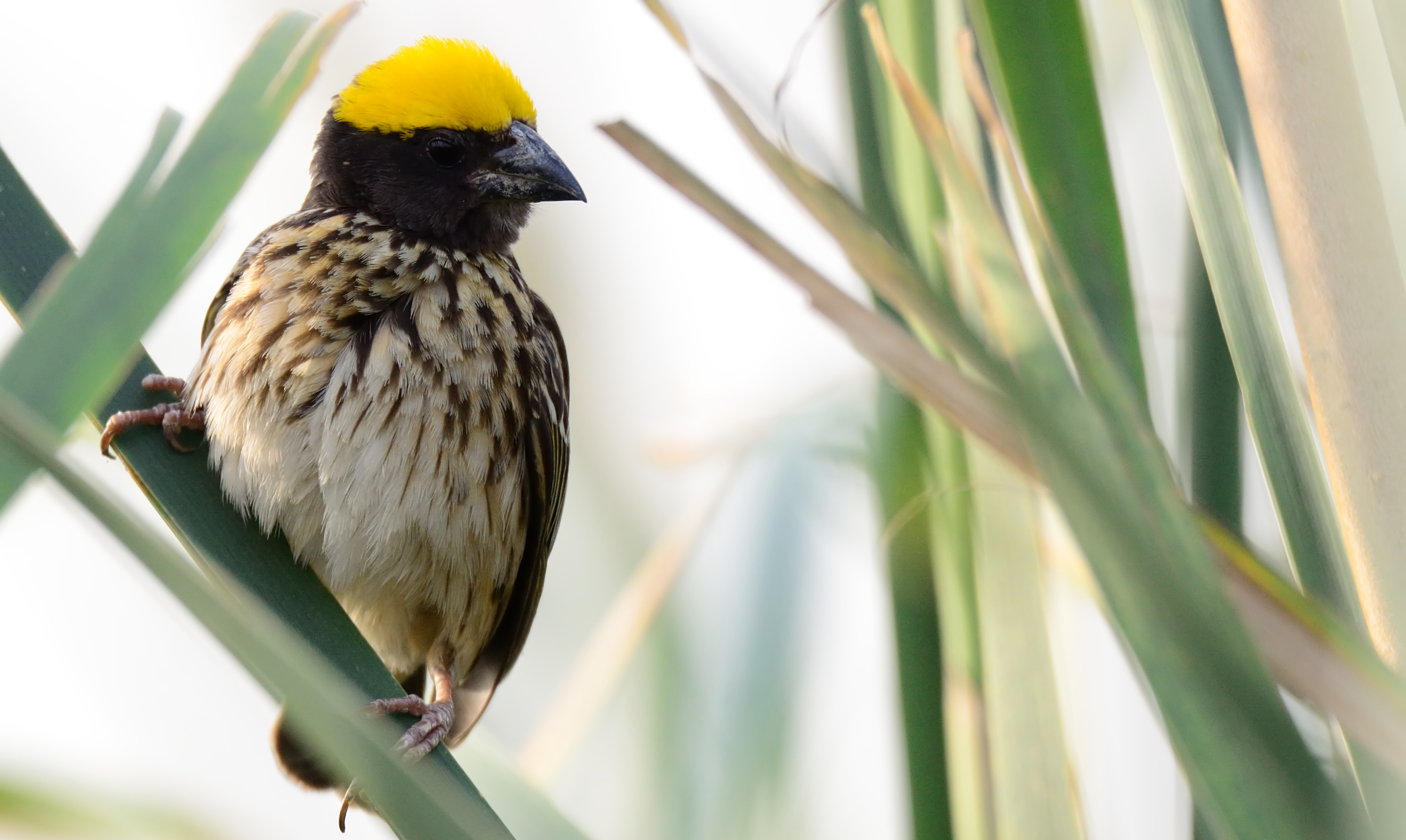
- Male in breeding plumage in Basai wetlands, India

Conservation status
- Least Concern (IUCN 3.1)

Scientific classification
- Kingdom: Animalia
- Phylum: Chordata
- Class: Aves
- Order: Passeriformes
- Family: Ploceidae
- Genus: Ploceus
- Species: P. manyar

Binomial name
- Ploceus manyar (Horsfield, 1821)

= Streaked weaver =

Species of bird

The streaked weaver (Ploceus manyar) is a species of weaver bird found in South Asia and South-east Asia in the countries of Bangladesh, Bhutan, Cambodia, China, Egypt, India, Indonesia, Myanmar, Nepal, Pakistan, Singapore, Sri Lanka, Thailand, Vietnam and also introduced in Qatar and United Arab Emirates (UAE). These are not as common as the baya weaver but are similar looking but have streaked underparts.

They nest in small colonies often in reed beds near water bodies.

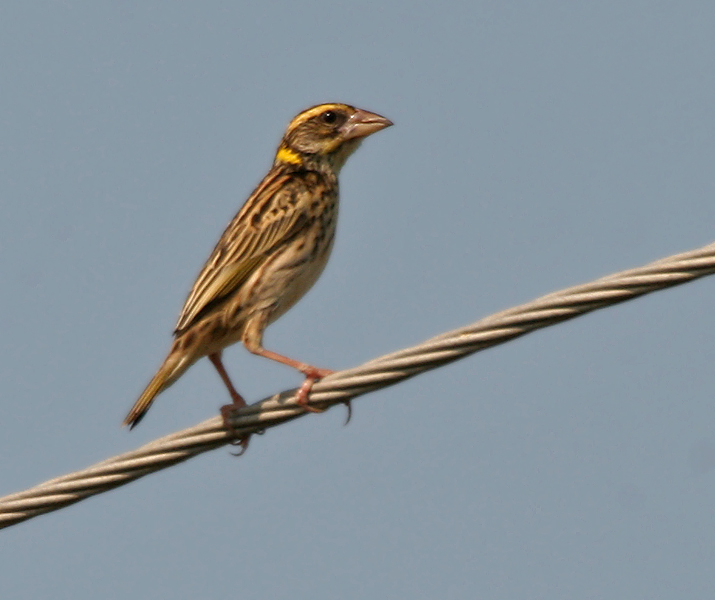
Male in non-breeding plumage in Krishna Wildlife Sanctuary, Andhra Pradesh, India.
