= List of birds of Africa =

Birds of Africa

This is a list of the bird species recorded in Africa. The area covered by this list is the Africa region defined by the American Birding Association's listing rules. In addition to the continent itself, the area includes Madagascar, Mauritius, Rodrigues, Seychelles, Cape Verde, the Comoro Islands, Zanzibar and the Canary Islands, São Tomé and Príncipe and Annobón in the Gulf of Guinea. It does not include Socotra in the Arabian Sea, Madeira or the Azores.

This list is that of the African Bird Club (ABC) supplemented by Bird Checklists of the World (Avibase).

This list's taxonomic treatment (designation and sequence of orders, families, and species) and nomenclature (common and scientific names) are those of the IOC World Bird List. Taxonomic changes are ongoing. As more research is gathered from studies of distribution, behaviour, and DNA, the names, sequence, and number of families and species change every year. Differences in common and scientific names between the Clements taxonomy and that of the ABC are frequent but are seldom noted here.

== By the numbers ==
This list contains 2712 species. Individual endemic species found in a single country are tagged (E-country); the rest of the endemics are tagged (E) or noted in text. The countries that have endemics and the number in each are listed below.

Places with endemic species:

- Algeria (1)
- Aldabra (4)
- Angola (10)
- Ascension (2)
- Cameroon (7)
- Canary Islands (7)
- Cape Verde (5)
- Comoros (18)
- Democratic Republic of the Congo (11)
- Djibouti (1)
- Equatorial Guinea (3)
- Ethiopia (9)
- Gough Island (2)
- Inaccessible Island (2)
- Kenya (11)
- Madagascar (109)
- Mauritius (28)
- Mayotte (4)
- Namibia (1)
- Nigeria (2)
- Nightingale Islands (1)
- Réunion (17)
- Rodrigues (11)
- Saint Helena (17)
- São Tomé and Príncipe (25)
- Seychelles (14)
- Somalia (8)
- South Africa (15)
- Sudan (2)
- Tanzania (29)
- Tristan da Cunha (1)
- Uganda (1)
- Zambia (1)

The sources classify vagrants; they are tagged (V). Some of them occur fairly frequently but are far outside their normal ranges; several have only a single record.

== Ostriches ==
Order: Struthioniformes Family: Struthionidae

The ostriches are flightless birds native to Africa. They are the largest living species of bird and are distinctive in appearance, with a long neck and legs and the ability to run at high speeds.

- Common ostrich, Struthio camelus
- Somali ostrich, Struthio molybdophanes (E)

== Ducks, geese, and waterfowl ==
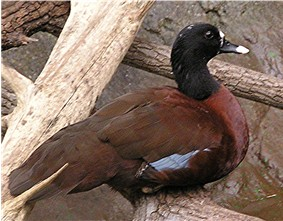
Hartlaub's duck occurs only in the forest regions

Order: Anseriformes Family: Anatidae

Anatidae includes the ducks and most duck-like waterfowl, such as geese and swans. These birds are adapted to an aquatic existence with webbed feet, flattened bills, and feathers that are excellent at shedding water due to an oily coating.

- White-faced whistling duck, Dendrocygna viduata
- Fulvous whistling duck, Dendrocygna bicolor
- White-backed duck, Thalassornis leuconotus
- Bar-headed goose, Anser indicus
- Snow goose, Anser caerulescens (V)
- Greylag goose, Anser anser
- Greater white-fronted goose, Anser albifrons
- Lesser white-fronted goose, Anser erythropus (V)
- Taiga bean goose, Anser fabalis
- Tundra bean goose, Anser serrirostris
- Brent goose, Branta bernicla (V)
- Barnacle goose, Branta leucopsis (V)
- Red-breasted goose, Branta ruficollis (V)
- Blue-winged goose, Cyanochen cyanoptera (E-Ethiopia)
- Mute swan, Cygnus olor
- Tundra swan, Cygnus columbianus (V)
- Whooper swan, Cygnus cygnus (V)
- Knob-billed duck, Sarkidiornis melanotos
- Hartlaub's duck, Pteronetta hartlaubii (E)
- Egyptian goose, Alopochen aegyptiaca
- Mauritius shelduck, Alopochen mauritiana (E-Mauritius) extinct
- Réunion shelduck, Alopochen kervazoi (E-Reunion) extinct
- Ruddy shelduck, Tadorna ferruginea
- South African shelduck, Tadorna cana (E)
- Australian shelduck, Tadorna tadornoides
- Common shelduck, Tadorna tadorna
- Spur-winged goose, Plectropterus gambensis (E)
- Muscovy duck, Cairina moschata (I)
- Cotton pygmy-goose, Nettapus coromandelianus (V)
- African pygmy-goose, Nettapus auritus
- Mandarin duck, Aix galericulata
- Garganey, Spatula querquedula
- Blue-billed teal, Spatula hottentota (E)
- Blue-winged teal, Spatula discors (V)
- Cinnamon teal, Spatula cyanoptera (V)
- Cape shoveler, Spatula smithii (E)
- Northern shoveler, Spatula clypeata
- Gadwall, Mareca strepera
- Eurasian wigeon, Mareca penelope
- American wigeon, Mareca americana (V)
- African black duck, Anas sparsa (E)
- Yellow-billed duck, Anas undulata (E)
- Meller's duck, Anas melleri (E-Madagascar)
- Mallard, Anas platyrhynchos
- American black duck, Anas rubripes (V)
- Cape teal, Anas capensis (E)
- Red-billed duck, Anas erythrorhyncha (E)
- Northern pintail, Anas acuta
- Eurasian teal, Anas crecca
- Green-winged teal, Anas carolinensis (V)
- Mauritius duck, Anas theodori (E-Mauritius) extinct
- Bernier's teal, Anas bernieri (E-Madagascar)
- Marbled teal, Marmaronetta angustirostris
- Red-crested pochard, Netta rufina
- Southern pochard, Netta erythrophthalma
- Common pochard, Aythya ferina
- Ring-necked duck, Aythya collaris (V)
- Ferruginous duck, Aythya nyroca
- Madagascar pochard, Aythya innotata (E-Madagascar)
- Tufted duck, Aythya fuligula
- Greater scaup, Aythya marila
- Lesser scaup, Aythya affinis (V)
- Common eider, Somateria mollissima (V)
- Velvet scoter, Melanitta fusca
- White-winged scoter, Melanitta deglandi (V)
- Common scoter, Melanitta nigra
- Long-tailed duck, Clangula hyemalis (V)
- Bufflehead, Bucephala albeola (V)
- Common goldeneye, Bucephala clangula (V)
- Smew, Mergellus albellus (V)
- Common merganser, Mergus merganser (V)
- Red-breasted merganser, Mergus serrator (V)
- Ruddy duck, Oxyura jamaicensis (V, I)
- White-headed duck, Oxyura leucocephala
- Maccoa duck, Oxyura maccoa (E)

== Guineafowl ==
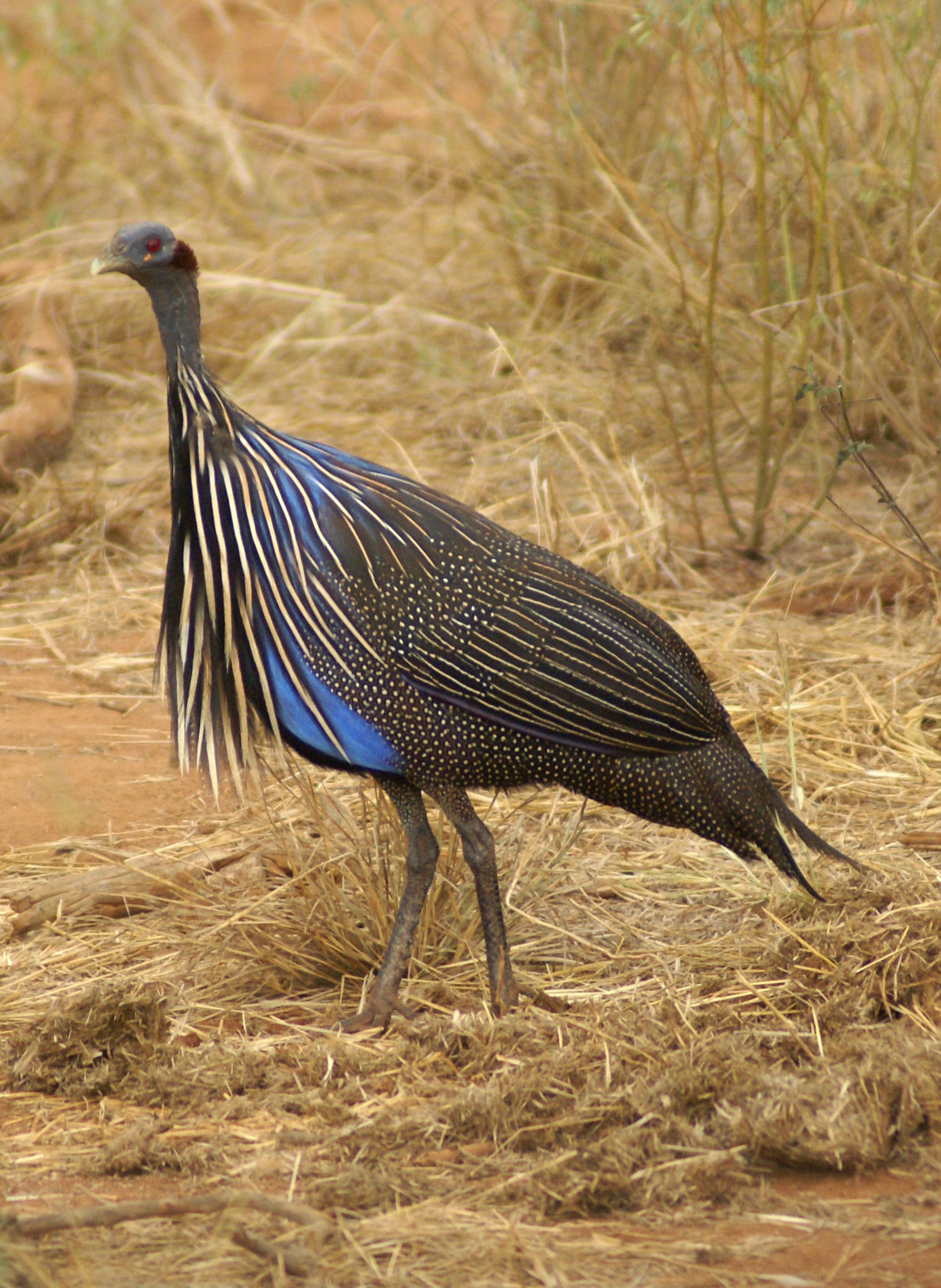
Vulturine guineafowl in Tsavo East National Park, Kenya

Order: Galliformes Family: Numididae

Guineafowl are a group of African, seed-eating, ground-nesting birds that resemble partridges, but with featherless heads and spangled grey plumage.

- Helmeted guineafowl, Numida meleagris (E)
- White-breasted guineafowl, Agelastes meleagrides (E)
- Black guineafowl, Agelastes niger (E)
- Vulturine guineafowl, Acryllium vulturinum (E)
- Plumed guineafowl, Guttera plumifera (E)
- Eastern crested guineafowl, Guttera pucherani (E)
- Western crested guineafowl, Guttera verreauxi (E)
- Southern crested guineafowl, Guttera edouardi (E)

== New World quail ==
Order: Galliformes Family: Odontophoridae

Despite their family's common name, two species are native to Africa.

- Stone partridge, Ptilopachus petrosus (E)
- Nahan's partridge, Ptilopachus nahani (E)
- Northern bobwhite, Colinus virginianus (I)
- California quail, Callipepla californica (I)

== Pheasants and allies ==
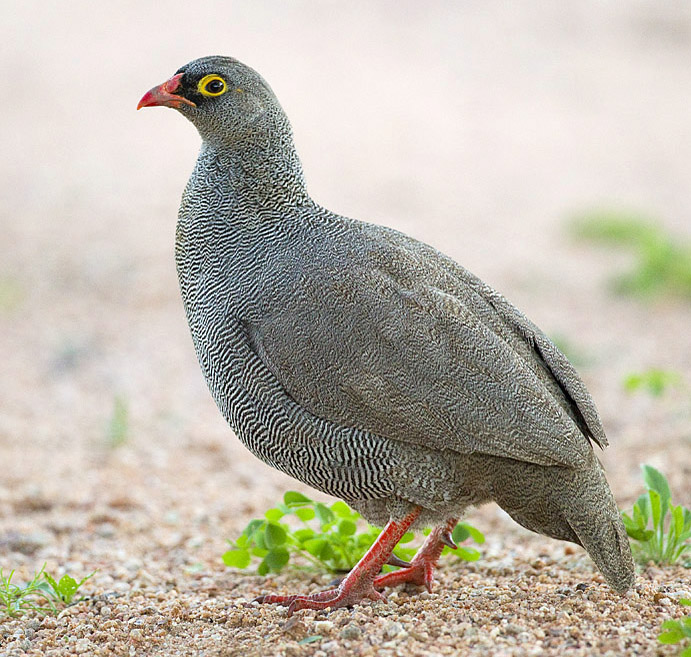
Red-billed francolin in Namibia

Order: Galliformes Family: Phasianidae

The Phasianidae are a family of terrestrial birds. In general, they are plump (although they vary in size) and have broad, relatively short wings.

- Udzungwa partridge, Xenoperdix udzungwensis (E-Tanzania)
- Rock ptarmigan, Lagopus muta (A)
- Reeves's pheasant, Syrmaticus reevesii (I)
- Common pheasant, Phasianus colchicus (I)
- Congo peacock, Afropavo congensis (E-Democratic Republic of the Congo)
- Indian peafowl, Pavo cristatus (I)
- Red junglefowl, Gallus gallus (I)
- Latham's francolin, Peliperdix lathami (E)
- Crested francolin, Ortygornis sephaena (E)
- Grey francolin, Ortygornis pondicerianus (I)
- Chinese francolin, Francolinus pintadeanus (I)
- Coqui francolin, Campocolinus coqui (E)
- White-throated francolin, Campocolinus albogularis (E)
- Schlegel's francolin, Campocolinus schlegelii (E)
- Ring-necked francolin, Scleroptila streptophora (E)
- Red-winged francolin, Scleroptila levaillantii (E)
- Finsch's francolin, Scleroptila finschi (E)
- Moorland francolin, Scleroptila psilolaema (E)
- Elgon francolin, Scleroptila elgonensis
- Grey-winged francolin, Scleroptila afra (E)
- Orange River francolin, Scleroptila gutturalis (E)
- Shelley's francolin, Scleroptila shelleyi (E)
- Whyte's francolin, Scleroptila whytei (E)
- Sand partridge, Ammoperdix heyi
- Blue-breasted quail, Synoicus chinensis (I)
- Blue quail, Synoicus adansonii (E)
- Madagascar partridge, Margaroperdix madagarensis (E-Madagascar)
- Common quail, Coturnix coturnix
- Harlequin quail, Coturnix delegorguei
- Barbary partridge, Alectoris barbara
- Arabian partridge, Alectoris melanocephala (I)
- Red-legged partridge, Alectoris rufa (I)
- Chukar, Alectoris chukar (I)
- Rock partridge, Alectoris graeca (I)
- Jungle bush-quail, Perdicula asiatica (I)
- Hartlaub's francolin, Pternistis hartlaubi (E)
- Cameroon francolin, Pternistis camerunensis (E-Cameroon)
- Handsome francolin, Pternistis nobilis (E)
- Chestnut-naped francolin, Pternistis castaneicollis (E)
- Erckel's francolin, Pternistis erckelii
- Djibouti francolin, Pternistis ochropectus (E-Djibouti)
- Swierstra's francolin, Pternistis swierstrai (E-Angola)
- Ahanta francolin, Pternistis ahantensis (E)
- Grey-striped francolin, Pternistis griseostriatus (E-Angola)
- Jackson's francolin, Pternistis jacksoni (E-Kenya)
- Red-billed francolin, Pternistis adspersus (E)
- Cape francolin, Pternistis capensis (E-South Africa)
- Natal francolin, Pternistis natalensis (E)
- Hildebrandt's francolin, Pternistis hildebrandti (E)
- Double-spurred francolin, Pternistis bicalcaratus (E)
- Scaly francolin, Pternistis squamatus (E)
- Heuglin's francolin, Pternistis icterorhynchus (E)
- Clapperton's francolin, Pternistis clappertoni (E)
- Harwood's francolin, Pternistis harwoodi (E-Ethiopia)
- Swainson's francolin, Pternistis swainsonii (E)
- Yellow-necked francolin, Pternistis leucoscepus (E)
- Grey-breasted francolin, Pternistis rufopictus (E-Tanzania)
- Red-necked francolin, Pternistis afer (E)

== Flamingos ==
Order: Phoenicopteriformes Family: Phoenicopteridae

Flamingos are gregarious wading birds, usually 1 to 1.5 metres (3 ft 3.4 in to 4 ft 11.1 in) tall, found in both the Western and Eastern Hemispheres. Flamingos filter-feed on shellfish and algae. Their oddly shaped beaks are specially adapted to separate mud and silt from the food they consume and, uniquely, are used upside-down.

- Greater flamingo, Phoenicopterus roseus
- Lesser flamingo, Phoeniconaias minor

== Grebes ==
Order: Podicipediformes Family: Podicipedidae

Grebes are small to medium-large freshwater diving birds. They have lobed toes and are excellent swimmers and divers. However, they have their feet placed far back on the body, making them quite ungainly on land.

- Alaotra grebe, Tachybaptus rufolavatus (E-Madagascar) extinct
- Little grebe, Tachybaptus ruficollis
- Madagascar grebe, Tachybaptus pelzelnii (E-Madagascar)
- Slavonian grebe, Podiceps auritus (V)
- Red-necked grebe, Podiceps grisegena (V)
- Great crested grebe, Podiceps cristatus
- Black-necked grebe, Podiceps nigricollis

== Pigeons and doves ==
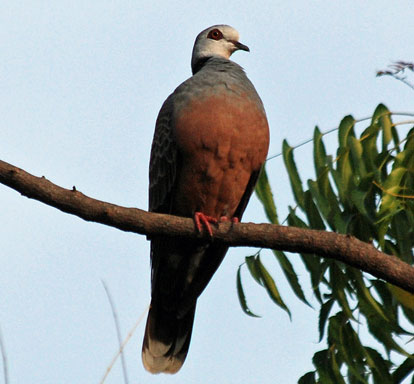
Adamawa turtle dove, localised resident of west central Africa

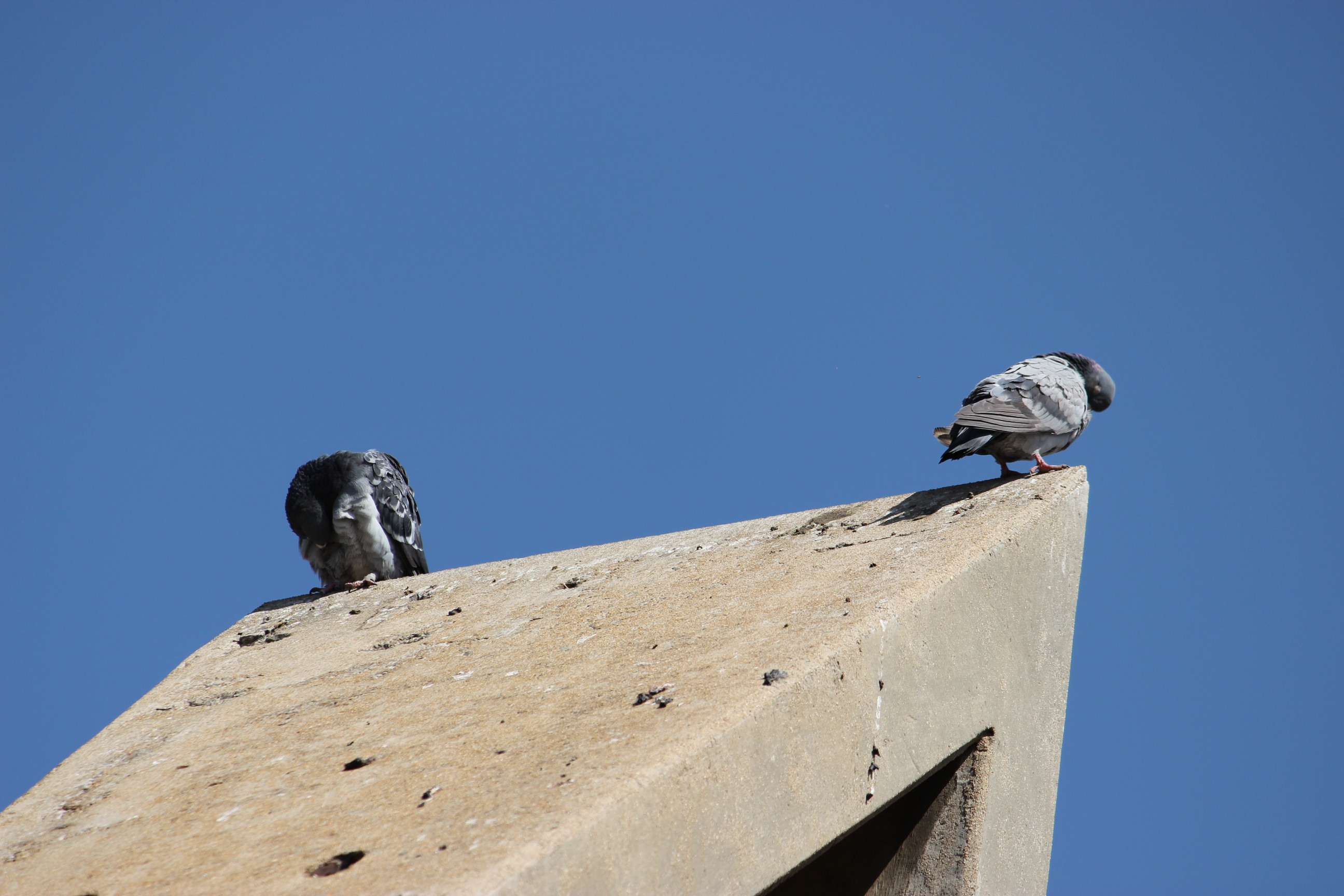
Doves resting on a monument at Randburg Library in South Africa

Order: Columbiformes Family: Columbidae

Pigeons and doves are stout-bodied birds with short necks and short slender bills with a fleshy cere.

- Rock pigeon, Columba livia
- Speckled pigeon, Columba guinea (E)
- White-collared pigeon, Columba albitorques (E)
- Stock dove, Columba oenas
- Somali pigeon, Columba oliviae (E-Somalia)
- Common wood pigeon, Columba palumbus
- Bolle's pigeon, Columba bollii (E)
- Afep pigeon, Columba unicincta (E)
- Laurel pigeon, Columba junoniae (E)
- Rameron pigeon, Columba arquatrix
- Cameroon pigeon, Columba sjostedti (E)
- Maroon pigeon, Columba thomensis (E-São Tomé and Príncipe)
- Delegorgue's pigeon, Columba delegorguei (E)
- Bronze-naped pigeon, Columba iriditorques (E)
- Sao Tome pigeon, Columba malherbii (E)
- Mauritian wood pigeon, Columba thiriouxi (E-Mauritius) extinct
- Lemon dove, Columba larvata (E)
- Comoro pigeon, Columba pollenii
- White-naped pigeon, Columba albinucha (E)
- Pink pigeon, Nesoenas mayeri (E-Mauritius)
- Reunion pigeon, Nesoenas duboisi extinct
- Mauritian turtle dove, Nesoenas cicur (E-Mauritius) extinct
- Rodrigues pigeon, Nesoenas rodericanus (E-Rodrigues) extinct
- European turtle dove, Streptopelia turtur
- Dusky turtle dove, Streptopelia lugens
- Adamawa turtle dove, Streptopelia hypopyrrha (E)
- Oriental turtle dove, Streptopelia orientalis (A)
- Eurasian collared dove, Streptopelia decaocto
- African collared dove, Streptopelia roseogrisea
- White-winged collared dove, Streptopelia reichenowi (E)
- Mourning collared dove, Streptopelia decipiens
- Red-eyed dove, Streptopelia semitorquata
- Ring-necked dove, Streptopelia capicola
- Vinaceous dove, Streptopelia vinacea (E)
- Malagasy turtle dove, Streptopelia picturata
- Spotted dove, Streptopelia chinensis (I)
- Laughing dove, Streptopelia senegalensis
- Emerald-spotted wood dove, Turtur chalcospilos (E)
- Black-billed wood dove, Turtur abyssinicus (E)
- Blue-spotted wood dove, Turtur afer (E)
- Tambourine dove, Turtur tympanistria
- Blue-headed wood dove, Turtur brehmeri (E)
- Namaqua dove, Oena capensis
- Zebra dove, Geopelia striata (I)
- Dodo, Raphus cucullatus (E-Mauritius) extinct
- Rodrigues solitaire, Pezophaps solitaria (E-Rodrigues) extinct
- Bruce's green pigeon, Treron waalia
- Comoros green pigeon, Treron griveaudi (E-Comoros)
- Pemba green pigeon, Treron pembaensis (E-Tanzania)
- Sao Tome green pigeon, Treron sanctithomae (E-São Tomé and Príncipe)
- African green pigeon, Treron calvus (E)
- Mauritius blue pigeon, Alectroenas nitidissimus (E-Mauritius) extinct
- Rodrigues blue pigeon, Alectroenas payandeei (E-Rodrigues) extinct
- Madagascar blue pigeon, Alectroenas madagascariensis (E-Madagascar)
- Comoro blue pigeon, Alectroenas sganzini
- Seychelles blue pigeon, Alectroenas pulcherrimus (E-Seychelles)

== Mesites ==
Order: Mesitornithiformes Family: Mesitornithidae

The mesites (Mesitornithidae) are a family of birds that are part of a clade (Columbimorphae) that include Columbiformes and Pterocliformes. They are smallish flightless or near flightless birds endemic to Madagascar. They are the only family with more than two species in which every species is threatened (all three are listed as vulnerable).

- White-breasted mesite, Mesitornis variegata (E-Madagascar)
- Brown mesite, Mesitornis unicolor (E-Madagascar)
- Subdesert mesite, Monias benschi (E-Madagascar)

== Sandgrouse ==
Order: Pterocliformes Family: Pteroclidae

Sandgrouse have small, pigeon like heads and necks, but sturdy compact bodies. They have long pointed wings and sometimes tails and a fast direct flight. Flocks fly to watering holes at dawn and dusk. Their legs are feathered down to the toes.

- Pin-tailed sandgrouse, Pterocles alchata
- Namaqua sandgrouse, Pterocles namaqua (E)
- Chestnut-bellied sandgrouse, Pterocles exustus
- Spotted sandgrouse, Pterocles senegallus
- Black-bellied sandgrouse, Pterocles orientalis
- Yellow-throated sandgrouse, Pterocles gutturalis (E)
- Crowned sandgrouse, Pterocles coronatus
- Black-faced sandgrouse, Pterocles decoratus (E)
- Madagascar sandgrouse, Pterocles personatus (E-Madagascar)
- Lichtenstein's sandgrouse, Pterocles lichtensteinii
- Double-banded sandgrouse, Pterocles bicinctus (E)
- Four-banded sandgrouse, Pterocles quadricinctus (E)
- Burchell's sandgrouse, Pterocles burchelli (E)

== Bustards ==
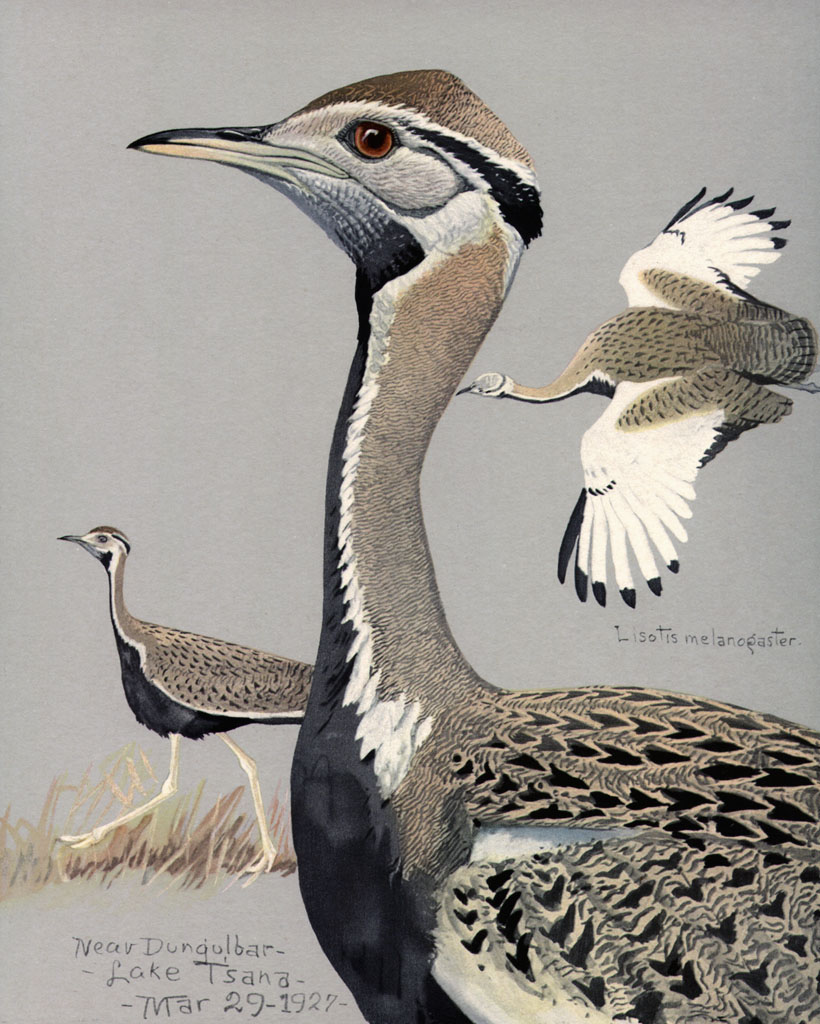
Black-bellied bustard is the most widespread bustard species in Africa

Order: Otidiformes Family: Otididae

Bustards are large terrestrial birds mainly associated with dry open country and steppes in the Old World. They are omnivorous and nest on the ground. They walk steadily on strong legs and big toes, pecking for food as they go. They have long broad wings with "fingered" wingtips and striking patterns in flight. Many have interesting mating displays.

- Great bustard, Otis tarda
- Arabian bustard, Ardeotis arabs
- Kori bustard, Ardeotis kori (E)
- Houbara bustard, Chlamydotis undulata
- MacQueen's bustard, Chlamydotis macqueenii
- Ludwig's bustard, Neotis ludwigii (E)
- Denham's bustard, Neotis denhami (E)
- Heuglin's bustard, Neotis heuglinii (E)
- Nubian bustard, Neotis nuba (E)
- White-bellied bustard, Eupodotis senegalensis (E)
- Blue bustard, Eupodotis caerulescens (E-South Africa)
- Karoo korhaan, Eupodotis vigorsii (E)
- Rüppell's bustard, Eupodotis rueppellii (E)
- Little brown bustard, Eupodotis humilis (E)
- Savile's bustard, Lophotis savilei (E)
- Buff-crested bustard, Lophotis gindiana (E)
- Red-crested bustard, Lophotis ruficrista (E)
- Black bustard, Afrotis afra (E)
- White-quilled bustard, Afrotis afraoides (E)
- Black-bellied bustard, Lissotis melanogaster (E)
- Hartlaub's bustard, Lissotis hartlaubii (E)
- Little bustard, Tetrax tetrax

== Turacos ==
Order: Musophagiformes Family: Musophagidae

The turacos, plantain eaters and go-away-birds make up the bird family Musophagidae. They are medium-sized arboreal birds. The turacos and plantain eaters are brightly coloured, usually in blue, green or purple. The go-away birds are mostly grey and white. The entire family is endemic to Africa.

- Great blue turaco, Corythaeola cristata
- Guinea turaco, Tauraco persa
- Livingstone's turaco, Tauraco livingstonii
- Schalow's turaco, Tauraco schalowi
- Knysna turaco, Tauraco corythaix
- Black-billed turaco, Tauraco schuettii
- White-crested turaco, Tauraco leucolophus
- Fischer's turaco, Tauraco fischeri
- Yellow-billed turaco, Tauraco macrorhynchus
- Bannerman's turaco, Tauraco bannermani (E-Cameroon)
- Red-crested turaco, Tauraco erythrolophus (E-Angola)
- Hartlaub's turaco, Tauraco hartlaubi
- White-cheeked turaco, Tauraco leucotis
- Prince Ruspoli's turaco, Tauraco ruspolii (E-Ethiopia)
- Purple-crested turaco, Tauraco porphyreolophus
- Rwenzori turaco, Ruwenzorornis johnstoni
- Violet turaco, Musophaga violacea
- Ross's turaco, Musophaga rossae
- Bare-faced go-away-bird, Corythaixoides personatus
- Grey go-away-bird, Corythaixoides concolor
- White-bellied go-away-bird, Corythaixoides leucogaster
- Western plantain-eater, Crinifer piscator
- Eastern plantain-eater, Crinifer zonurus

== Cuckoos ==
Order: Cuculiformes Family: Cuculidae

The family Cuculidae includes cuckoos, roadrunners and anis. These birds are of variable size with slender bodies, long tails and strong legs. The Old World cuckoos are brood parasites.

- Crested coua, Coua cristata (E-Madagascar)
- Verreaux's coua, Coua verreauxi (E-Madagascar)
- Blue coua, Coua caerulea (E-Madagascar)
- Red-capped coua, Coua ruficeps (E-Madagascar)
- Red-fronted coua, Coua reynaudii (E-Madagascar)
- Coquerel's coua, Coua coquereli (E-Madagascar)
- Running coua, Coua cursor (E-Madagascar)
- Giant coua, Coua gigas (E-Madagascar)
- Snail-eating coua, Coua delalandei (E-Madagascar) extinct
- Red-breasted coua, Coua serriana (E-Madagascar)
- Gabon coucal, Centropus anselli (E)
- Black-throated coucal, Centropus leucogaster (E)
- Senegal coucal, Centropus senegalensis (E)
- Blue-headed coucal, Centropus monachus (E)
- Coppery-tailed coucal, Centropus cupreicaudus (E)
- White-browed coucal, Centropus superciliosus
- Malagasy coucal, Centropus toulou
- Black coucal, Centropus grillii (E)
- Blue malkoha, Ceuthmochares aereus (E)
- Green malkoha, Ceuthmochares australis (E)
- Great spotted cuckoo, Clamator glandarius
- Levaillant's cuckoo, Clamator levaillantii (E)
- Pied cuckoo, Clamator jacobinus
- Yellow-billed cuckoo, Coccyzus americanus (V)
- St. Helena cuckoo, Nannococcyx psix (E-Saint Helena) extinct
- Thick-billed cuckoo, Pachycoccyx audeberti
- Dideric cuckoo, Chrysococcyx caprius
- Klaas's cuckoo, Chrysococcyx klaas
- Yellow-throated cuckoo, Chrysococcyx flavigularis (E)
- African emerald cuckoo, Chrysococcyx cupreus (E)
- Pallid cuckoo, Cacomantis pallidus (V)
- Dusky long-tailed cuckoo, Cercococcyx mechowi (E)
- Olive long-tailed cuckoo, Cercococcyx olivinus (E)
- Barred long-tailed cuckoo, Cercococcyx montanus (E)
- Black cuckoo, Cuculus clamosus (E)
- Red-chested cuckoo, Cuculus solitarius (E)
- Lesser cuckoo, Cuculus poliocephalus
- African cuckoo, Cuculus gularis
- Madagascar cuckoo, Cuculus rochii
- Himalayan cuckoo, Cuculus saturatus (V)
- Common cuckoo, Cuculus canorus

== Nightjars ==
Order: Caprimulgiformes Family: Caprimulgidae

Nightjars are medium-sized nocturnal birds that usually nest on the ground. They have long wings, short legs and very short bills. Most have small feet, of little use for walking, and long pointed wings. Their soft plumage is camouflaged to resemble bark or leaves.

- Collared nightjar, Gactornis enarratus (E-Madagascar)
- Pennant-winged nightjar, Caprimulgus vexillarius (E)
- Standard-winged nightjar, Caprimulgus longipennis (E)
- Brown nightjar, Caprimulgus binotatus (E)
- Red-necked nightjar, Caprimulgus ruficollis
- Eurasian nightjar, Caprimulgus europaeus
- Sombre nightjar, Caprimulgus fraenatus (E)
- Rufous-cheeked nightjar, Caprimulgus rufigena (E)
- Egyptian nightjar, Caprimulgus aegyptius
- Nubian nightjar, Caprimulgus nubicus
- Golden nightjar, Caprimulgus eximius (E)
- Donaldson-Smith's nightjar, Caprimulgus donaldsoni (E)
- Fiery-necked nightjar, Caprimulgus pectoralis (E)
- Montane nightjar, Caprimulgus poliocephalus (E)
- Madagascar nightjar, Caprimulgus madagascariensis
- Swamp nightjar, Caprimulgus natalensis (E)
- Plain nightjar, Caprimulgus inornatus
- Star-spotted nightjar, Caprimulgus stellatus (E)
- Nechisar nightjar, Caprimulgus solala (E-Ethiopia)
- Freckled nightjar, Caprimulgus tristigma (E)
- Itombwe nightjar, Caprimulgus prigoginei (E)
- Bates's nightjar, Caprimulgus batesi (E)
- Long-tailed nightjar, Caprimulgus climacurus (E)
- Slender-tailed nightjar, Caprimulgus clarus (E)
- Square-tailed nightjar, Caprimulgus fossii (E)

== Swifts ==
Order: Caprimulgiformes Family: Apodidae

Swifts are small birds which spend the majority of their lives flying. These birds have very short legs and never settle voluntarily on the ground, perching instead only on vertical surfaces. Many swifts have long swept-back wings which resemble a crescent or boomerang.

- Madagascar spinetail, Zoonavena grandidieri (E-Madagascar)
- Sao Tome spinetail, Zoonavena thomensis (E-São Tomé and Príncipe)
- Mottled spinetail, Telacanthura ussheri (E)
- Black spinetail, Telacanthura melanopygia (E)
- Sabine's spinetail, Rhaphidura sabini (E)
- Cassin's spinetail, Neafrapus cassini (E)
- Bat-like spinetail, Neafrapus boehmi (E)
- Chimney swift, Chaetura pelagica (V)
- White-throated needletail, Hirundapus caudacutus (V)
- Seychelles swiftlet, Aerodramus elaphrus (E-Seychelles)
- Mascarene swiftlet, Aerodramus francicus
- Scarce swift, Schoutedenapus myoptilus (E)
- Alpine swift, Apus melba
- Mottled swift, Apus aequatorialis (E)
- Alexander's swift, Apus alexandri (E-Cape Verde)
- Common swift, Apus apus
- Plain swift, Apus unicolor
- Nyanza swift, Apus niansae (E)
- Pallid swift, Apus pallidus
- African swift, Apus barbatus (E)
- Forbes-Watson's swift, Apus berliozi (E)
- Bradfield's swift, Apus bradfieldi (E)
- Malagasy swift, Apus balstoni
- Pacific swift, Apus pacificus (V)
- Little swift, Apus affinis
- Horus swift, Apus horus (E)
- White-rumped swift, Apus caffer
- Bates's swift, Apus batesi (E)
- African palm-swift, Cypsiurus parvus
- Malagasy palm-swift, Cypsiurus gracilis

== Flufftails ==
Order: Gruiformes Family: Sarothruridae

The flufftails are a small family of ground-dwelling birds found only in Madagascar and sub-Saharan Africa.

- Madagascar wood-rail, Mentocrex kioloides (E-Madagascar)
- Tsingy wood-rail, Mentocrex beankaensis (E-Madagascar)
- White-spotted flufftail, Sarothrura pulchra
- Buff-spotted flufftail, Sarothrura elegans
- Red-chested flufftail, Sarothrura rufa
- Chestnut-headed flufftail, Sarothrura lugens
- Streaky-breasted flufftail, Sarothrura boehmi
- Striped flufftail, Sarothrura affinis
- Madagascar flufftail, Sarothrura insularis (E-Madagascar)
- White-winged flufftail, Sarothrura ayresi
- Slender-billed flufftail, Sarothrura watersi (E-Madagascar)

== Rails ==
Order: Gruiformes Family: Rallidae

Rallidae is a large family of small to medium-sized birds which includes the rails, crakes, coots and gallinules. Typically they inhabit dense vegetation in damp environments near lakes, swamps or rivers. In general they are shy and secretive birds, making them difficult to observe. Most species have strong legs and long toes which are well adapted to soft uneven surfaces. They tend to have short, rounded wings and to be weak fliers.

- Water rail, Rallus aquaticus
- African rail, Rallus caerulescens (E)
- Madagascar rail, Rallus madagascariensis (E-Madagascar)
- White-throated rail, Dryolimnas cuvieri
- Reunion rail, Dryolimnas augusti (E-Réunion) extinct
- Red rail, Aphanapteryx bonasia (E-Mauritius) extinct
- Rodrigues rail, Erythromachus leguati (E-Rodrigues) extinct
- Corn crake, Crex crex
- African crake, Crex egregia (E)
- Rouget's rail, Rougetius rougetii (E)
- St. Helena crake, Atlantisia podarces (E-St. Helena) extinct
- Ascension crake, Mundia elpenor (E-Ascension) extinct
- Inaccessible Island rail, Atlantasia rogersi (E-Inaccessible Island)
- Buff-banded rail, Gallirallus philippensis (V)
- Grey-throated rail, Canirallus oculeus
- Sora, Porzana carolina (V)
- Spotted crake, Porzana porzana
- Lesser moorhen, Paragallinula angulata
- Common moorhen, Gallinula chloropus
- Gough moorhen, Gallinula comeri (E-Gough Island)
- Tristan moorhen, Gallinula nesiotis (E-Tristan da Cunha) extinct
- Eurasian coot, Fulica atra
- Mascarene coot, Fulica newtonii extinct
- Red-knobbed coot, Fulica cristata
- Allen's gallinule, Porphyrio alleni
- Purple gallinule, Porphyrio martinica (V)
- Reunion gallinule, Porphyrio caerulescens (E-Réunion) extinct
- Western swamphen, Porphyrio porphyrio
- African swamphen, Porphyrio madagascariensis
- Nkulengu rail, Himantornis haematopus (E)
- Watercock, Gallicrex cinerea (V)
- White-breasted waterhen, Amaurornis phoenicurus (V)
- Striped crake, Amaurornis marginalis (E)
- Black crake, Zapornia flavirostra
- Little crake, Zapornia parva
- Baillon's crake, Zapornia pusilla
- St. Helena rail, Zapornia astrictocarpus (E-St. Helena) extinct
- Sakalava rail, Zapornia olivieri (E-Madagascar)

== Finfoots ==
Order: Gruiformes Family: Heliornithidae

Heliornithidae is a small family of tropical birds with webbed lobes on their feet similar to those of grebes and coots.

- African finfoot, Podica senegalensis (E)

== Cranes ==
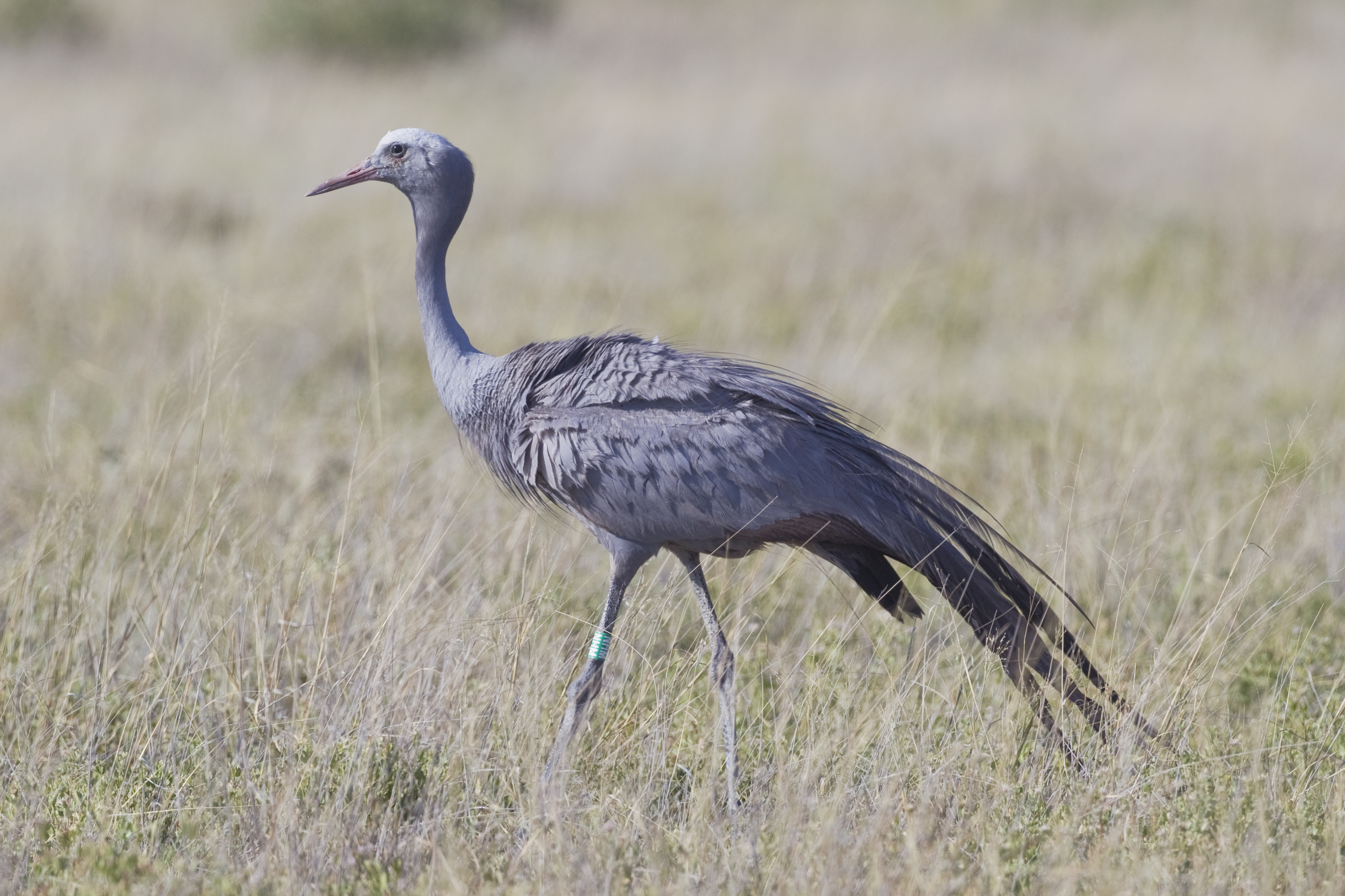
Blue crane in Etosha National Park, Namibia

Order: Gruiformes Family: Gruidae

Cranes are large, long-legged and long-necked birds. Unlike the similar-looking but unrelated herons, cranes fly with necks outstretched, not pulled back. Most have elaborate and noisy courting displays or "dances".

- Grey crowned crane, Balearica regulorum (E)
- Black crowned crane, Balearica pavonina (E)
- Demoiselle crane, Anthropoides virgo
- Blue crane, Anthropoides paradiseus (E)
- Wattled crane, Bugeranus carunculatus (E)
- Common crane, Grus grus

== Sheathbills ==
Order: Charadriiformes Family: Chionididae

The sheathbills are scavengers of the Antarctic regions. They have white plumage and look plump and dove-like but are believed to be similar to the ancestors of the modern gulls and terns.

- Snowy sheathbill, Chionis albus (V) (ship-assisted)

== Thick-knees or stone-curlews ==
Order: Charadriiformes Family: Burhinidae

The thick-knees or stone-curlews are a group of waders found worldwide within the tropical zone, with some species also breeding in temperate Europe and Australia. They are medium to large waders with strong black or yellow-black bills, large yellow eyes, and cryptic plumage. Despite being classed as waders, most species have a preference for arid or semi-arid habitats.

- Water thick-knee, Burhinus vermiculatus (E)
- Eurasian stone-curlew, Burhinus oedicnemus
- Indian stone-curlew, Burhinus indicus (V)
- Senegal thick-knee, Burhinus senegalensis
- Spotted thick-knee, Burhinus capensis

== Egyptian plover ==
Order: Charadriiformes Family: Pluvianidae

The Egyptian plover is found across equatorial Africa and along the Nile River.

- Egyptian plover, Pluvianus aegyptius

== Stilts and avocets ==
Order: Charadriiformes Family: Recurvirostridae

Recurvirostridae is a family of large wading birds, which includes the avocets and stilts. The avocets have long legs and long up-curved bills. The stilts have extremely long legs and long, thin, straight bills.

- Black-winged stilt, Himantopus himantopus
- Pied avocet, Recurvirostra avosetta

== Oystercatchers ==
Order: Charadriiformes Family: Haematopodidae

The oystercatchers are large and noisy plover-like birds, with strong bills used for smashing or prising open molluscs.

- Eurasian oystercatcher, Haematopus ostralegus
- African oystercatcher, Haematopus moquini (E)

== Plovers and lapwings ==
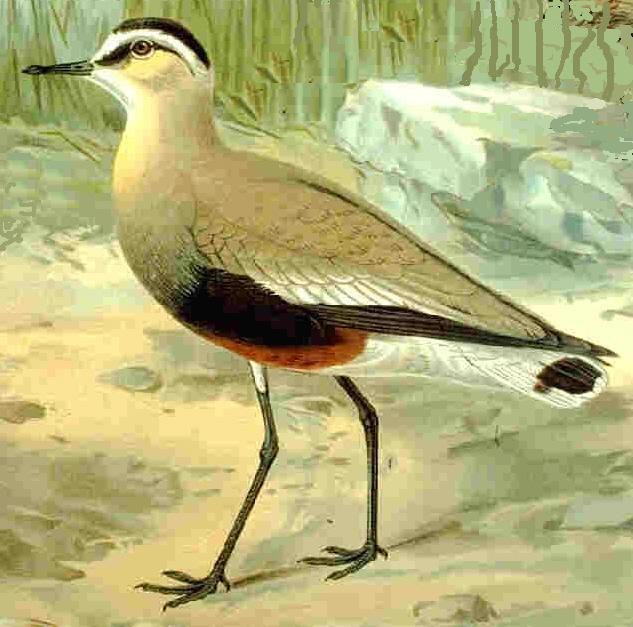
The vulnerable sociable lapwing winters in north east Africa

Order: Charadriiformes Family: Charadriidae

The family Charadriidae includes the plovers, dotterels and lapwings. They are small to medium-sized birds with compact bodies, short, thick necks and long, usually pointed, wings. They are found in open country worldwide, mostly in habitats near water.

- Grey plover, Pluvialis squatarola
- European golden plover, Pluvialis apricaria
- American golden plover, Pluvialis dominica (V)
- Pacific golden plover, Pluvialis fulva (V)
- Northern lapwing, Vanellus vanellus
- Long-toed lapwing, Vanellus crassirostris (E)
- Blacksmith lapwing, Vanellus armatus (E)
- Spur-winged lapwing, Vanellus spinosus
- Black-headed lapwing, Vanellus tectus
- White-headed lapwing, Vanellus albiceps (E)
- Senegal lapwing, Vanellus lugubris
- Black-winged lapwing, Vanellus melanopterus (E)
- Crowned lapwing, Vanellus coronatus (E)
- Wattled lapwing, Vanellus senegallus (E)
- Spot-breasted lapwing, Vanellus melanocephalus (E-Ethiopia)
- Brown-chested lapwing, Vanellus superciliosus (E)
- Sociable lapwing, Vanellus gregarius
- White-tailed lapwing, Vanellus leucurus
- Lesser sand plover, Charadrius mongolus
- Greater sand plover, Charadrius leschenaultii
- Caspian plover, Charadrius asiaticus
- Kittlitz's plover, Charadrius pecuarius
- Kentish plover, Charadrius alexandrinus
- Common ringed plover, Charadrius hiaticula
- Semipalmated plover, Charadrius semipalmatus (V)
- Madagascar plover, Charadrius thoracicus (E-Madagascar)
- Little ringed plover, Charadrius dubius
- Three-banded plover, Charadrius tricollaris
- Forbes's plover, Charadrius forbesi (E)
- White-fronted plover, Charadrius marginatus
- Chestnut-banded plover, Charadrius pallidus (E)
- Oriental plover, Charadrius veredus (V)
- Eurasian dotterel, Charadrius morinellus
- St. Helena plover, Charadrius sanctaehelenae (E-St. Helena)

== Painted-snipes ==
Order: Charadriiformes Family: Rostratulidae

Painted-snipes are short-legged, long-billed birds similar in shape to the true snipes, but more brightly coloured.

- Greater painted-snipe, Rostratula benghalensis

== Jacanas ==
Order: Charadriiformes Family: Jacanidae

The jacanas are a family of waders found throughout the tropics. They are identifiable by their huge feet and claws which enable them to walk on floating vegetation in the shallow lakes that are their preferred habitat.

- Lesser jacana, Microparra capensis (E)
- African jacana, Actophilornis africanus (E)
- Madagascar jacana, Actophilornis albinucha (E-Madagascar)

== Sandpipers and allies ==
Order: Charadriiformes Family: Scolopacidae

Scolopacidae is a large diverse family of small to medium-sized shorebirds including the sandpipers, curlews, godwits, shanks, tattlers, woodcocks, snipes, dowitchers and phalaropes. The majority of these species eat small invertebrates picked out of the mud or soil. Variation in length of legs and bills enables multiple species to feed in the same habitat, particularly on the coast, without direct competition for food.

- Upland sandpiper, Bartramia longicauda (V)
- Eurasian whimbrel, Numenius phaeopus
- Little curlew, Numenius minutus
- Far Eastern curlew, Numenius madagascariensis
- Slender-billed curlew, Numenius tenuirostris
- Eurasian curlew, Numenius arquata
- Bar-tailed godwit, Limosa lapponica
- Black-tailed godwit, Limosa limosa
- Hudsonian godwit, Limosa haemastica (V)
- Ruddy turnstone, Arenaria interpres
- Great knot, Calidris tenuirostris (V)
- Red knot, Calidris canutus
- Ruff, Calidris pugnax
- Broad-billed sandpiper, Calidris falcinellus
- Sharp-tailed sandpiper, Calidris acuminata (V)
- Stilt sandpiper, Calidris himantopus (V)
- Curlew sandpiper, Calidris ferruginea
- Temminck's stint, Calidris temminckii
- Long-toed stint, Calidris subminuta (V)
- Red-necked stint, Calidris ruficollis (V)
- Sanderling, Calidris alba
- Dunlin, Calidris alpina
- Purple sandpiper, Calidris maritima (V)
- Baird's sandpiper, Calidris bairdii (V)
- Little stint, Calidris minuta (V)
- Least sandpiper, Calidris minutilla (V)
- White-rumped sandpiper, Calidris fuscicollis (V)
- Buff-breasted sandpiper, Calidris subruficollis (V)
- Pectoral sandpiper, Calidris melanotos (V)
- Semipalmated sandpiper, Calidris pusilla (V)
- Western sandpiper, Calidris mauri (V)
- Asian dowitcher, Limnodromus semipalmatus (V)
- Short-billed dowitcher, Limnodromus griseus (V)
- Long-billed dowitcher, Limnodromus scolopaceus (V)
- Jack snipe, Lymnocryptes minimus
- Eurasian woodcock, Scolopax rusticola
- Great snipe, Gallinago media
- Common snipe, Gallinago gallinago
- Wilson's snipe, Gallinago delicata (V)
- Pin-tailed snipe, Gallinago stenura (V)
- African snipe, Gallinago nigripennis (E)
- Madagascar snipe, Gallinago nigripennis (E-Madagascar)
- Terek sandpiper, Xenus cinereus
- Wilson's phalarope, Phalaropus tricolor (V)
- Red-necked phalarope, Phalaropus lobatus
- Red phalarope, Phalaropus fulicarius
- Common sandpiper, Actitis hypoleucos
- Spotted sandpiper, Actitis macularius (V)
- Green sandpiper, Tringa ochropus
- Solitary sandpiper, Tringa solitaria (V)
- Grey-tailed tattler, Tringa brevipes (V)
- Spotted redshank, Tringa erythropus
- Greater yellowlegs, Tringa melanoleuca (V)
- Common greenshank, Tringa nebularia
- Lesser yellowlegs, Tringa flavipes (V)
- Marsh sandpiper, Tringa stagnatilis
- Wood sandpiper, Tringa glareola
- Common redshank, Tringa totanus

== Buttonquail ==
Order: Charadriiformes Family: Turnicidae

The buttonquail are small, drab, running birds which resemble the true quails. The female is the brighter of the sexes and initiates courtship. The male incubates the eggs and tends the young.

- Common buttonquail, Turnix sylvaticus
- Black-rumped buttonquail, Turnix nanus (E)
- Fynbos buttonquail, Turnix hottentottus (E-South Africa)
- Madagascar buttonquail, Turnix nigricollis (E-Madagascar)
- Quail-plover, Ortyxelos meiffrenii (E)

== Crab-plover ==
Order: Charadriiformes Family: Dromadidae

The crab-plover is related to the waders. It resembles a plover but with very long grey legs and a strong heavy black bill similar to a tern's. It has black-and-white plumage, a long neck, partially webbed feet, and a bill designed for eating crabs.

- Crab-plover, Dromas ardeola

== Pratincoles and coursers ==
Order: Charadriiformes Family: Glareolidae

Glareolidae is a family of wading birds comprising the pratincoles, which have short legs, long pointed wings and long forked tails, and the coursers, which have long legs, short wings and long, pointed bills which curve downwards.

- Cream-coloured courser, Cursorius cursor
- Somali courser, Cursorius somalensis (E)
- Burchell's courser, Cursorius rufus (E)
- Temminck's courser, Cursorius temminckii (E)
- Double-banded courser, Smutsornis africanus (E)
- Three-banded courser, Rhinoptilus cinctus (E)
- Bronze-winged courser, Rhinoptilus chalcopterus (E)
- Collared pratincole, Glareola pratincola
- Oriental pratincole, Glareola maldivarum
- Black-winged pratincole, Glareola nordmanni
- Madagascar pratincole, Glareola ocularis
- Rock pratincole, Glareola nuchalis (E)
- Grey pratincole, Glareola cinerea (E)

== Skuas and jaegers ==
Order: Charadriiformes Family: Stercorariidae

The family Stercorariidae are, in general, medium to large birds, typically with grey or brown plumage, often with white markings on the wings. They nest on the ground in temperate and arctic regions and are long-distance migrants.

- Great skua, Stercorarius skua
- South polar skua, Stercorarius maccormicki (V)
- Brown skua, Stercorarius antarcticus
- Pomarine jaeger, Stercorarius pomarinus
- Parasitic jaeger, Stercorarius parasiticus
- Long-tailed jaeger, Stercorarius longicaudus

== Auks ==
Order: Charadriiformes Family: Alcidae

Alcids are superficially similar to penguins due to their black-and-white plumage, their upright posture and some of their habits, however they are not related to the penguins and differ in being able to fly. Auks live on the open sea, only deliberately coming ashore to nest.

- Little auk, Alle alle
- Common guillemot, Uria aalge
- Razorbill, Alca torda
- Black guillemot, Cepphus grylle (V)
- Atlantic puffin, Fratercula arctica

== Gulls ==
Order: Charadriiformes Family: Laridae

Laridae is a family of medium to large seabirds including gulls, terns, and skimmers. Gulls are typically grey or white, often with black markings on the head or wings. They have stout, longish bills and webbed feet. Terns are a group of generally medium to large seabirds typically with grey or white plumage, often with black markings on the head. Most terns hunt fish by diving but some pick insects off the surface of fresh water. Terns are generally long-lived birds, with several species known to live in excess of 30 years. Skimmers are a small family of tropical tern-like birds. They have an elongated lower mandible which they use to feed by flying low over the water surface and skimming the water for small fish.

- Black-legged kittiwake, Rissa tridactyla
- Sabine's gull, Xema sabini
- Slender-billed gull, Chroicocephalus genei
- Bonaparte's gull, Chroicocephalus philadelphia (V)
- Grey-headed gull, Chroicocephalus cirrocephalus
- Hartlaub's gull, Chroicocephalus hartlaubii
- Black-headed gull, Chroicocephalus ridibundus
- Brown-headed gull, Chroicocephalus brunnicephalus
- Little gull, Hydrocoloeus minutus
- Laughing gull, Leucophaeus atricilla (V)
- Franklin's gull, Leucophaeus pipixcan (V)
- Mediterranean gull, Ichthyaetus melanocephalus
- White-eyed gull, Ichthyaetus leucophthalmus
- Sooty gull, Ichthyaetus hemprichii
- Pallas's gull, Ichthyaetus ichthyaetus
- Audouin's gull, Ichthyaetus audouinii
- Common gull, Larus canus
- Ring-billed gull, Larus delawarensis (V)
- Herring gull, Larus argentatus (V)
- Yellow-legged gull, Larus michahellis
- Caspian gull, Larus cachinnans
- Armenian gull, Larus armenicus
- Iceland gull, Larus glaucoides (V)
- Lesser black-backed gull, Larus fuscus
- Glaucous-winged gull, Larus glaucescens (V)
- Glaucous gull, Larus hyperboreus (V)
- Great black-backed gull, Larus marinus (V)
- Kelp gull, Larus dominicanus
- Brown noddy, Anous stolidus
- Black noddy, Anous minutus
- Lesser noddy, Anous tenuirostris
- White tern, Gygis alba (V)
- Sooty tern, Onychoprion fuscata
- Bridled tern, Onychoprion anaethetus
- Little tern, Sternula albifrons
- Saunders's tern, Sternula saundersi
- Damara tern, Sterna balaenarum (E)
- Gull-billed tern, Gelochelidon nilotica
- Caspian tern, Hydroprogne caspia
- Black tern, Chlidonias niger
- White-winged tern, Chlidonias leucopterus
- Whiskered tern, Chlidonias hybrida
- Roseate tern, Sterna dougallii
- Black-naped tern, Sterna sumatrana
- Common tern, Sterna hirundo
- Arctic tern, Sterna paradisaea
- Antarctic tern, Sterna vittata
- White-cheeked tern, Sterna repressa
- Great crested tern, Sterna bergii
- Sandwich tern, Thalasseus sandvicensis
- Elegant tern, Thalasseus elegans (V)
- Lesser crested tern, Thalasseus bengalensis
- West African crested tern, Thalasseus albididorsalis
- Black skimmer, Rynchops niger (V)
- African skimmer, Rynchops flavirostris

== Tropicbirds ==
Order: Phaethontiformes Family: Phaethontidae

Tropicbirds are slender white birds of tropical oceans, with exceptionally long central tail feathers. Their heads and long wings have black markings.

- White-tailed tropicbird, Phaethon lepturus
- Red-billed tropicbird, Phaethon aethereus
- Red-tailed tropicbird, Phaethon rubricauda

== Loons ==
Order: Gaviiformes Family: Gaviidae

Loons, known as divers in Europe, are a group of aquatic birds found in many parts of North America and northern Europe. They are the size of a large duck or small goose, which they somewhat resemble when swimming, but to which they are completely unrelated.

- Red-throated loon, Gavia stellata (V)
- Arctic loon, Gavia arctica (V)
- Common loon, Gavia immer (V)
- Yellow-billed loon, Gavia adamsii (V)

== Penguins ==
Order: Sphenisciformes Family: Spheniscidae

The penguins are a group of aquatic, flightless birds living almost exclusively in the Southern Hemisphere. Most penguins feed on krill, fish, squid and other forms of sealife caught while swimming underwater.

- King penguin, Aptenodytes patagonicus (V)
- Gentoo penguin, Pygoscelis papua (V)
- African penguin, Spheniscus demersus
- Macaroni penguin, Eudyptes chrysolophus (V)
- Southern rockhopper penguin, Eudyptes chrysocome (V)
- Moseley's rockhopper penguin, Eudyptes moseleyi (V)

== Albatrosses ==
Order: Procellariiformes Family: Diomedeidae

The albatrosses are among the largest of flying birds, and the great albatrosses of the genus Diomedea have the largest wingspans of any extant birds.

- Yellow-nosed albatross, Thalassarche chlororhynchos
- Grey-headed albatross, Thalassarche chrysostoma
- Buller's albatross, Thalassarche bulleri (V)
- white-capped albatross, Thalassarche cauta
- Salvin's albatross, Thalassarche salvini
- Chatham albatross, Thalassarche eremita (V)
- Black-browed albatross, Thalassarche melanophris
- Sooty albatross, Phoebetria fusca
- Light-mantled albatross, Phoebetria palpebrata
- Royal albatross, Diomedea epomophora
- Wandering albatross, Diomedea exulans
- Laysan albatross, Phoebastria immutabilis (V)

== Southern storm petrels ==
Order: Procellariiformes Family: Oceanitidae

The storm petrels are the smallest seabirds, relatives of the petrels, feeding on planktonic crustaceans and small fish picked from the surface, typically while hovering. The flight is fluttering and sometimes bat-like. Until 2018, this family's species were included with the other storm petrels in family Hydrobatidae.

- Wilson's storm petrel, Oceanites oceanicus
- Grey-backed storm petrel, Garrodia nereis (V)
- White-faced storm petrel, Pelagodroma marina
- White-bellied storm petrel, Fregetta grallaria (V)
- Black-bellied storm petrel, Fregetta tropica

== Northern storm petrels ==
Order: Procellariiformes Family: Hydrobatidae

Though the members of this family are similar in many respects to the southern storm petrels, including their general appearance and habits, there are enough genetic differences to warrant their placement in a separate family.

- European storm petrel, Hydrobates pelagicus (V)
- Leach's storm petrel, Hydrobates leucorhous
- Swinhoe's storm petrel, Hydrobates monorhis
- Band-rumped storm petrel, Hydrobates castro
- Cape Verde storm petrel, Hydrobates jabejabe
- Matsudaira's storm petrel, Hydrobates matsudairae (V)

== Shearwaters and petrels ==
Order: Procellariiformes Family: Procellariidae

The procellariids are the main group of medium-sized petrels and sheawaters, characterised by united nostrils with medium septum and a long outer functional primary.

- Southern giant petrel, Macronectes giganteus
- Northern giant petrel, Macronectes halli
- Northern fulmar, Fulmarus glacialis (V)
- Southern fulmar, Fulmarus glacialoides
- Antarctic petrel, Thalassoica antarctica (V)
- Cape petrel, Daption capense
- Snow petrel, Pagodroma nivea (V)
- Kerguelen petrel, Lugensa brevirostris
- Large St. Helena petrel, Pterodroma rupinarum (E-St. Helena) extinct
- Great-winged petrel, Pterodroma macroptera
- Grey-faced petrel, Pterodroma gouldi (V)
- Kermadec petrel, Pterodroma neglecta (V)
- Trindade petrel, Pterodroma arminjoniana
- Herald petrel, Pterodroma heraldica
- Murphy's petrel, Pterodroma ultima (V)
- Zino's petrel, Pterodroma madeira
- Fea's petrel, Pterodroma feae
- Soft-plumaged petrel, Pterodroma mollis
- Barau's petrel, Pterodroma baraui (V)
- White-headed petrel, Pterodroma lessonii (V)
- Black-capped petrel, Pterodroma hasitata (V)
- Atlantic petrel, Pterodroma incerta (V)
- Blue petrel, Halobaena caerulea (V)
- Fairy prion, Pachyptila turtur (V)
- Broad-billed prion, Pachyptila vittata
- Salvin's prion, Pachyptila salvini
- MacGillivray's prion, Pachyptila macgillivrayi
- Antarctic prion, Pachyptila desolata
- Slender-billed prion, Pachyptila belcheri (V)
- Fulmar prion, Pachyptila crassirostris (V)
- Bulwer's petrel, Bulweria bulwerii
- Jouanin's petrel, Bulweria fallax
- Small St. Helena petrel, Bulweria bifax (E-St. Helena) extinct
- Mascarene petrel, Pseudobulweria aterrima
- Tahiti petrel, Pseudobulweria rostrata
- Grey petrel, Procellaria cinerea
- White-chinned petrel, Procellaria aequinoctialis
- Spectacled petrel, Procellaria conspicillata
- Streaked shearwater, Calonectris leucomelas (V)
- Cory's shearwater, Calonectris diomedea
- Cape Verde shearwater, Calonectris edwardsii
- Flesh-footed shearwater, Ardenna carneipes
- Great shearwater, Ardenna gravis
- Wedge-tailed shearwater, Ardenna pacifica
- Sooty shearwater, Ardenna grisea
- Short-tailed shearwater, Ardenna tenuirostris (V)
- Manx shearwater, Puffinus puffinus
- Yelkouan shearwater, Puffinus yelkouan
- Balearic shearwater, Puffinus mauretanicus
- Little shearwater, Puffinus assimilis
- Subantarctic shearwater, Puffinus elegans
- Barolo shearwater, Puffinus baroli
- Boyd's shearwater, Puffinus boydi (E)
- Tropical shearwater, Puffinus bailloni
- Persian shearwater, Puffinus persicus
- Common diving-petrel, Pelecanoides urinatrix (V)

== Storks ==
Order: Ciconiiformes Family: Ciconiidae

Storks are large, long-legged, long-necked, wading birds with long, stout bills. Storks are mute, but bill-clattering is an important mode of communication at the nest. Their nests can be large and may be reused for many years. Many species are migratory.

- African openbill, Anastomus lamelligerus
- Black stork, Ciconia nigra
- Abdim's stork, Ciconia abdimii
- African woolly-necked stork, Ciconia microscelis
- White stork, Ciconia ciconia
- Saddle-billed stork, Ephippiorhynchus senegalensis (E)
- Marabou stork, Leptoptilos crumenifer
- Yellow-billed stork, Mycteria ibis

== Frigatebirds ==
Order: Suliformes Family: Fregatidae

Frigatebirds are large seabirds usually found over tropical oceans. They are large, black-and-white, or completely black, with long wings and deeply forked tails. The males have red inflatable throat pouches. They do not swim or walk and cannot take off from a flat surface. Having the largest wingspan-to-body-weight ratio of any bird, they are essentially aerial, able to stay aloft for more than a week.

- Lesser frigatebird, Fregata ariel
- Ascension frigatebird, Fregata aquila (V)
- Magnificent frigatebird, Fregata magnificens
- Christmas Island frigatebird, Fregata andrewsi (V)
- Great frigatebird, Fregata minor

== Boobies and gannets ==
Order: Suliformes Family: Sulidae

The sulids comprise the gannets and boobies. Both groups are medium to large coastal seabirds that plunge-dive for fish.

- Masked booby, Sula dactylatra
- Brown booby, Sula leucogaster
- Red-footed booby, Sula sula (V)
- Abbott's booby, Papasula abbotti
- Northern gannet, Morus bassanus
- Cape gannet, Morus capensis
- Australasian gannet, Morus serrator

== Darters ==
Order: Suliformes Family: Anhingidae

Darters or anhingas are often called "snake-birds" because of their long thin neck, which gives a snake-like appearance when they swim with their bodies submerged. The males have black and dark-brown plumage, an erectile crest on the nape and a larger bill than the female. The females have much paler plumage especially on the neck and underparts. The darters have completely webbed feet and their legs are short and set far back on the body. Their plumage is somewhat permeable, like that of cormorants, and they spread their wings to dry after diving.

- African darter, Anhinga rufa
- Oriental darter, Anhinga melanogaster (V)

== Cormorants ==
Order: Suliformes Family: Phalacrocoracidae

Phalacrocoracidae is a family of medium to large coastal, fish-eating seabirds that includes cormorants and shags. Plumage colouration varies, with the majority having mainly dark plumage, some species being black-and-white and a few being colourful.

- Long-tailed cormorant, Microcarbo africanus
- Crowned cormorant, Microcarbo coronatus (E)
- Pygmy cormorant, Microcarbo pygmeus (V)
- Bank cormorant, Phalacrocorax neglectus (E)
- Cape cormorant, Phalacrocorax capensis (E)
- Great cormorant, Phalacrocorax carbo
- Socotra cormorant, Phalacrocorax nigrogularis
- European shag, Phalacrocorax aristotelis

== Pelicans ==
Order: Pelecaniformes Family: Pelecanidae

Pelicans are large water birds with a distinctive pouch under their beak. As with other members of the order Pelecaniformes, they have webbed feet with four toes.

- Great white pelican, Pelecanus onocrotalus
- Pink-backed pelican, Pelecanus rufescens
- Dalmatian pelican, Pelecanus crispus

== Shoebill ==
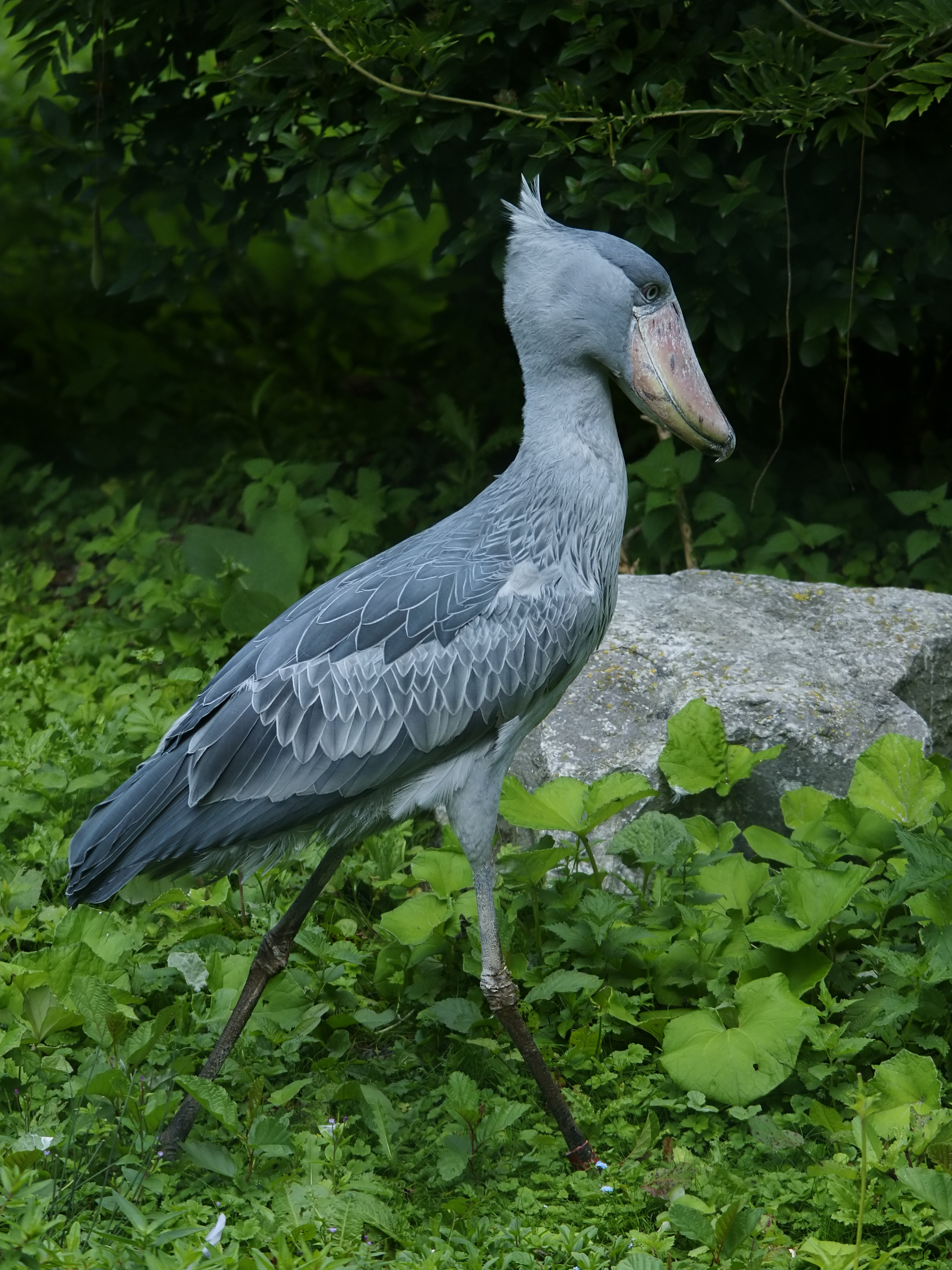
Shoebill

Order: Pelecaniformes Family: Balaenicipitidae

The shoebill was formerly thought to be related to storks but is in the same order as pelicans. It derives its name from its massive shoe-shaped bill.

- Shoebill, Balaeniceps rex (E)

== Hamerkop ==
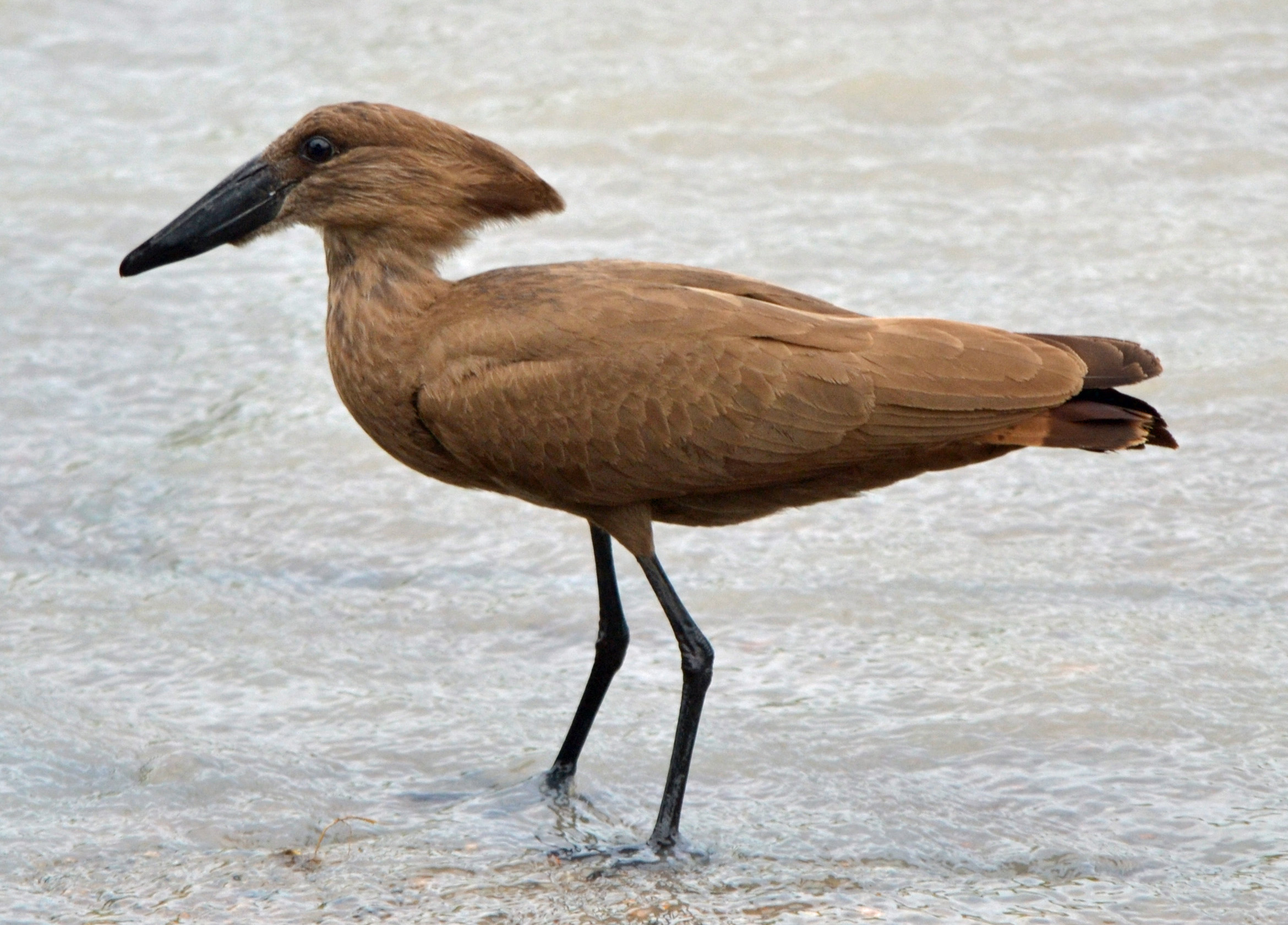
Hamerkop in South Luangwa National Park, Zambia

Order: Pelecaniformes Family: Scopidae

The hamerkop is a medium-sized bird with a long shaggy crest. The shape of its head with a curved bill and crest at the back is reminiscent of a hammer, hence its name. Its plumage is drab brown all over.

- Hamerkop, Scopus umbretta

== Herons, egrets, and bitterns ==
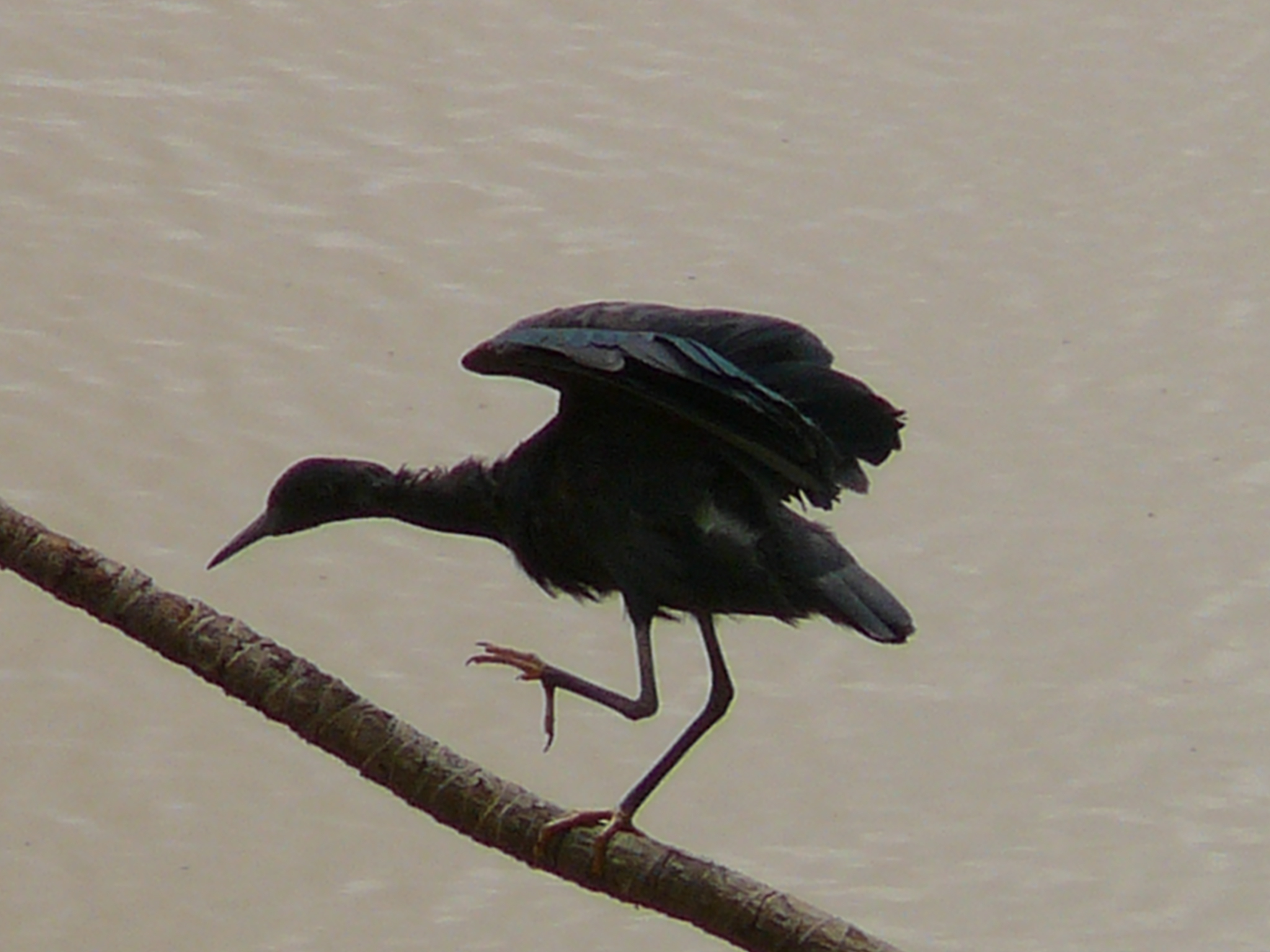
The black heron is endemic to Africa and Madagascar

Order: Pelecaniformes Family: Ardeidae

The family Ardeidae contains the bitterns, herons and egrets. Herons and egrets are medium to large wading birds with long necks and legs. Bitterns tend to be shorter necked and more wary. Members of Ardeidae fly with their necks retracted, unlike other long-necked birds such as storks, ibises and spoonbills.

- American bittern, Botaurus lentiginosus (V)
- Great bittern, Botaurus stellaris
- Yellow bittern, Ixobrychus sinensis (V)
- Little bittern, Ixobrychus minutus
- Schrenck's bittern, Ixobrychus eurhythmus (V)
- Cinnamon bittern, Ixobrychus cinnamomeus (V)
- Dwarf bittern, Ixobrychus sturmii (V)
- Least bittern, Ixobrychus exilis (V)
- White-crested bittern, Tigriornis leucolopha (E)
- Great blue heron, Ardea herodias (V)
- Grey heron, Ardea cinerea
- Black-headed heron, Ardea melanocephala
- Humblot's heron, Ardea humbloti
- Goliath heron, Ardea goliath
- Purple heron, Ardea purpurea
- Great egret, Ardea alba
- Intermediate egret, Ardea intermedia
- Little egret, Egretta garzetta
- Western reef heron, Egretta gularis
- Snowy egret, Egretta thula (V)
- Little blue heron, Egretta caerulea (V)
- Slaty egret, Egretta vinaceigula (E)
- Black heron, Egretta ardesiaca
- Cattle egret, Bubulcus ibis
- Squacco heron, Ardeola ralloides
- Indian pond heron, Ardeola grayii (V)
- Malagasy pond heron, Ardeola idae
- Rufous-bellied heron, Ardeola rufiventris (E)
- Striated heron, Butorides striata
- Reunion night heron, Nycticorax duboisi (E-Réunion) extinct
- Mauritius night heron, Nycticorax mauritianus (E-Mauritius) extinct
- Rodrigues night heron, Nycticorax megacephalus (E-Rodrigues) extinct
- Black-crowned night heron, Nycticorax nycticorax
- White-backed night heron, Gorsachius leuconotus (E)

== Ibises ==
Order: Pelecaniformes Family: Threskiornithidae

Threskiornithidae is a family of large terrestrial and wading birds which includes the ibises and spoonbills. They have long, broad wings with 11 primary and about 20 secondary feathers. They are strong fliers and despite their size and weight, very capable soarers.

- Glossy ibis, Plegadis falcinellus
- Madagascar ibis, Lophotibis cristata (E-Madagascar)
- African sacred ibis, Threskiornis aethiopicus
- Malagasy sacred ibis, Threskiornis bernieri
- Reunion ibis, Threskiornis solitarius (E-Réunion) extinct
- Northern bald ibis, Geronticus eremita
- Southern bald ibis, Geronticus calvus (E)
- Olive ibis, Bostrychia olivacea (E)
- Sao Tome ibis, Bostrychia bocagei (E-São Tomé and Príncipe)
- Spot-breasted ibis, Bostrychia rara (E)
- Hadada ibis, Bostrychia hagedash (E)
- Wattled ibis, Bostrychia carunculata (E)
- Eurasian spoonbill, Platalea leucorodia
- African spoonbill, Platalea alba

== Secretarybird ==
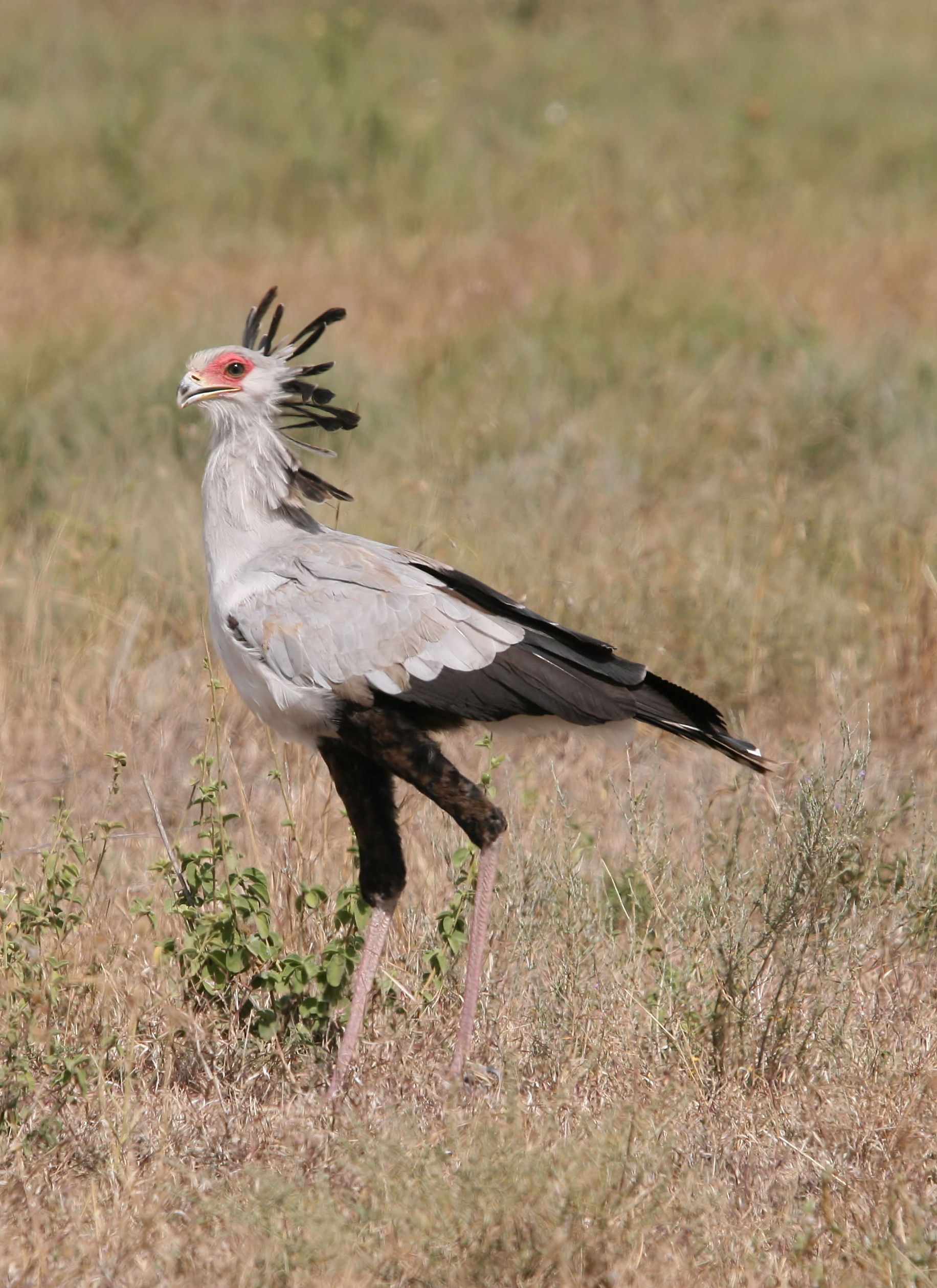
Secretarybird in Serengeti National Park

Order: Accipitriformes Family: Sagittariidae

The secretarybird is a bird of prey in the order Accipitriformes but is easily distinguished from other raptors by its long crane-like legs.

- Secretarybird, Sagittarius serpentarius (E)

== Osprey ==
Order: Accipitriformes Family: Pandionidae

The family Pandionidae contains only one species, the osprey. The osprey is a medium-large raptor which is a specialist fish-eater with a worldwide distribution.

- Osprey, Pandion haliaetus

== Hawks and eagles ==
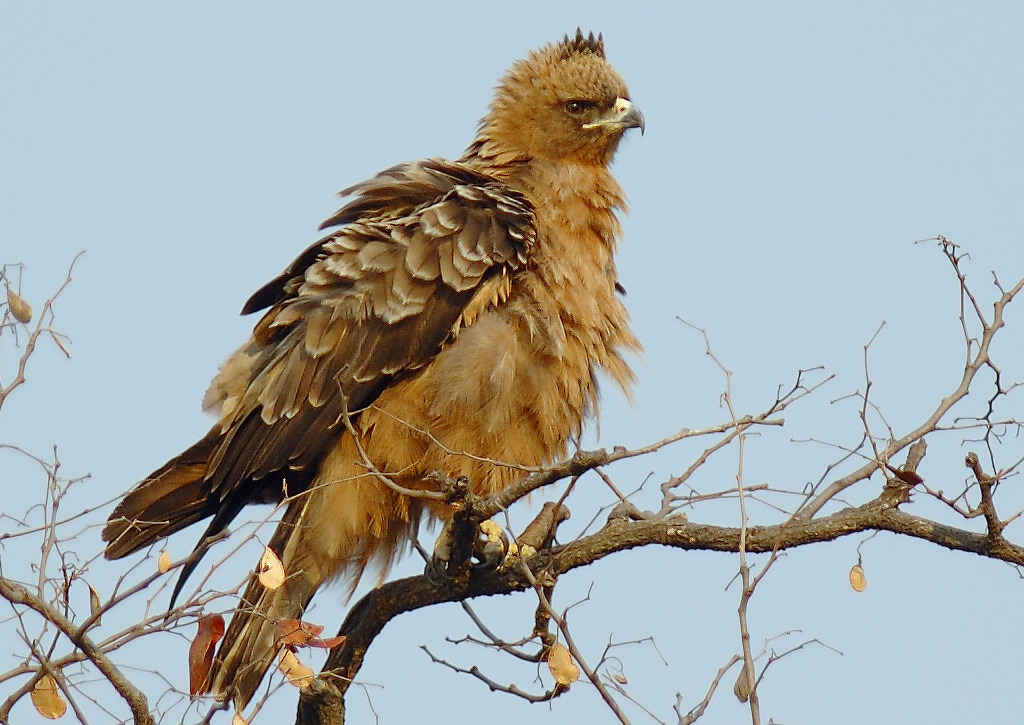
Wahlberg's eagle is an intra-African migrant

Order: Accipitriformes Family: Accipitridae

Accipitridae is a family of birds of prey, which includes hawks, eagles, kites, harriers and Old World vultures. These birds have powerful hooked beaks for tearing flesh from their prey, strong legs, powerful talons and keen eyesight.

- Black-winged kite, Elanus caeruleus
- Black-shouldered kite, Elanus axillaris (V)
- Scissor-tailed kite, Chelictinia riocourii
- African harrier-hawk, Polyboroides typus (E)
- Palm-nut vulture, Gypohierax angolensis (E)
- Madagascar serpent eagle, Eutriorchis astur (E-Madagascar)
- Bearded vulture, Gypaetus barbatus
- Egyptian vulture, Neophron percnopterus
- European honey-buzzard, Pernis apivorus
- Oriental honey-buzzard, Pernis ptilorhynchus (V)
- African cuckoo-hawk, Aviceda cuculoides (E)
- Madagascar cuckoo-hawk, Aviceda madagascariensis (E-Madagascar)
- White-headed vulture, Trigonoceps occipitalis (E)
- Eurasian black vulture, Aegypius monachus
- Lappet-faced vulture, Torgos tracheliotos
- Hooded vulture, Necrosyrtes monachus
- White-backed vulture, Gyps africanus (E)
- Rüppell's vulture, Gyps rueppelli
- Griffon vulture, Gyps fulvus
- Cape vulture, Gyps coprotheres (E)
- Bateleur, Terathopius ecaudatus
- Congo serpent eagle, Dryotriorchis spectabilis (E)
- Short-toed snake eagle, Circaetus gallicus
- Beaudouin's snake eagle, Circaetus beaudouini (E)
- Black-chested snake eagle, Circaetus pectoralis (E)
- Brown snake eagle, Circaetus cinereus (E)
- Fasciated snake eagle, Circaetus fasciolatus (E)
- Western banded snake eagle, Circaetus cinerascens (E)
- Bat hawk, Macheiramphus alcinus
- Crowned eagle, Stephanoaetus coronatus (E)
- Martial eagle, Polemaetus bellicosus (E)
- Long-crested eagle, Lophaetus occipitalis
- Lesser spotted eagle, Clanga pomarina
- Greater spotted eagle, Clanga clanga
- Wahlberg's eagle, Hieraaetus wahlbergi (E)
- Booted eagle, Hieraaetus pennatus
- Ayres's hawk-eagle, Hieraaetus ayresii (E)
- Tawny eagle, Aquila rapax
- Steppe eagle, Aquila nipalensis
- Spanish eagle, Aquila adalberti (regionally extinct)
- Eastern imperial eagle, Aquila heliaca
- Golden eagle, Aquila chrysaetos
- Cassin's hawk-eagle, Aquila africana (E)
- Verreaux's eagle, Aquila verreauxii
- Bonelli's eagle, Aquila fasciata
- African hawk-eagle, Aquila spilogaster (E)
- Lizard buzzard, Kaupifalco monogrammicus (E)
- Dark chanting goshawk, Melierax metabates
- Eastern chanting goshawk, Melierax poliopterus (E)
- Pale chanting goshawk, Melierax canorus (E)
- Gabar goshawk, Micronisus gabar
- Grasshopper buzzard, Butastur rufipennis
- Eurasian marsh harrier, Circus aeruginosus
- African marsh harrier, Circus ranivorus (E)
- Reunion harrier, Circus maillardi (E-Reunion)
- Malagasy harrier, Circus macrosceles
- Black harrier, Circus maurus (E)
- Hen harrier, Circus cyaneus
- Pallid harrier, Circus macrourus
- Montagu's harrier, Circus pygargus
- African goshawk, Accipiter tachiro (E)
- Chestnut-flanked sparrowhawk, Accipiter castanilius (E)
- Red-chested goshawk, Accipiter toussenelii (E)
- Shikra, Accipiter badius
- Levant sparrowhawk, Accipiter brevipes
- Frances's sparrowhawk, Accipiter francesiae
- Red-thighed sparrowhawk, Accipiter erythropus (E)
- Little sparrowhawk, Accipiter minullus (E)
- Madagascar sparrowhawk, Accipiter madagascariensis (E-Madagascar)
- Ovambo sparrowhawk, Accipiter ovampensis (E)
- Eurasian sparrowhawk, Accipiter nisus
- Rufous-breasted sparrowhawk, Accipiter rufiventris (E)
- Black sparrowhawk, Accipiter melanoleucus (E)
- Henst's goshawk, Accipiter henstii (E-Madagascar)
- Eurasian goshawk, Accipiter gentilis
- Long-tailed hawk, Urotriorchis macrourus (E)
- Red kite, Milvus milvus
- Black kite, Milvus migrans
- White-tailed eagle, Haliaeetus albicilla (V)
- White-bellied sea eagle, Haliaeetus leucogaster (V)
- African fish eagle, Haliaeetus vocifer (E)
- Madagascar fish eagle, Haliaeetus vociferoides (E-Madagascar)
- Rough-legged buzzard, Buteo lagopus (V)
- Common buzzard, Buteo buteo
- Mountain buzzard, Buteo oreophilus (E)
- Forest buzzard, Buteo trizonatus (E)
- Madagascar buzzard, Buteo brachypterus (E-Madagascar)
- Long-legged buzzard, Buteo rufinus
- Red-necked buzzard, Buteo auguralis (E)
- Augur buzzard, Buteo augur (E)
- Jackal buzzard, Buteo rufofuscus (E)

== Barn owls ==
Order: Strigiformes Family: Tytonidae

Barn owls are medium to large owls with large heads and characteristic heart-shaped faces. They have long strong legs with powerful talons.

- African grass owl, Tyto capensis (E)
- Western barn owl, Tyto alba
- Red owl, Tyto soumagnei (E-Madagascar)
- Itombwe owl, Tyto prigoginei (E-Democratic Republic of the Congo)

== Owls ==
Order: Strigiformes Family: Strigidae

The typical owls are small to large solitary nocturnal birds of prey. They have large forward-facing eyes and ears, a hawk-like beak and a conspicuous circle of feathers around each eye called a facial disk.

- Sandy scops owl, Otus icterorhynchus (E)
- Sokoke scops owl, Otus ireneae (E)
- Eurasian scops owl, Otus scops
- Pemba scops owl, Otus pembaensis (E-Tanzania)
- Sao Tome scops owl, Otus hartlaubi (E-São Tomé and Príncipe)
- African scops owl, Otus senegalensis
- Pallid scops owl, Otus brucei
- Moheli scops owl, Otus moheliensis (E-Comoro Islands)
- Comoro scops owl, Otus pauliani (E-Comoro Islands)
- Seychelles scops owl, Otus insularis (E-Seychelles)
- Anjouan scops owl, Otus capnodes (E-Comoro Islands)
- Mayotte scops owl, Otus mayottensis (E-Comoro Islands)
- Réunion scops owl, Otus grucheti (E-Réunion) extinct
- Rodrigues scops owl, Otus murivorus (E-Rodrigues) extinct
- Mauritius scops owl, Otus sauzieri (E-Mauritius) extinct
- Madagascar scops owl, Otus rutilus (E-Madagascar)
- Northern white-faced owl, Ptilopsis leucotis (E)
- Southern white-faced owl, Ptilopsis granti (E)
- Maned owl, Jubula lettii (E)
- Eurasian eagle-owl, Bubo bubo
- Pharaoh eagle-owl, Bubo ascalaphus
- Cape eagle-owl, Bubo capensis (E)
- Spotted eagle-owl, Bubo africanus
- Greyish eagle-owl, Bubo cinerascens (E)
- Fraser's eagle-owl, Bubo poensis (E)
- Shelley's eagle-owl, Bubo shelleyi (E)
- Verreaux's eagle-owl, Bubo lacteus (E)
- Akun eagle owl, Bubo leucostictus (E)
- Brown fish owl, Ketupa zeylonensis (V)
- Pel's fishing owl, Scotopelia peli (E)
- Rufous fishing owl, Scotopelia ussheri (E)
- Vermiculated fishing owl, Scotopelia bouvieri (E)
- Pearl-spotted owlet, Glaucidium perlatum (E)
- Red-chested owlet, Glaucidium tephronotum (E)
- Sjöstedt's owlet, Glaucidium sjostedti (E)
- African barred owlet, Glaucidium capense (E)
- Albertine owlet, Glaucidium albertinum (E)
- Little owl, Athene noctua
- White-browed owl, Athene superciliaris (E-Madagascar)
- Maghreb owl, Strix mauritanica (E)
- Desert owl, Strix hadorami
- African wood-owl, Strix woodfordii (E)
- Long-eared owl, Asio otus
- Abyssinian owl, Asio abyssinicus (E)
- Madagascar owl, Asio madagascariensis (E-Madagascar)
- Short-eared owl, Asio flammeus
- Marsh owl, Asio capensis

== Mousebirds ==
Order: Coliiformes Family: Coliidae

The mousebirds are slender greyish or brown birds with soft, hairlike body feathers and very long thin tails. They are arboreal and scurry through the leaves like rodents in search of berries, fruit and buds. They are acrobatic and can feed upside down. All species have strong claws and reversible outer toes. They also have crests and stubby bills. These six species are endemic to Africa.

- Speckled mousebird, Colius striatus
- White-headed mousebird, Colius leucocephalus
- Red-backed mousebird, Colius castanotus
- White-backed mousebird, Colius colius
- Blue-naped mousebird, Urocolius macrourus
- Red-faced mousebird, Urocolius indicus

== Cuckoo-roller ==
Order: Leptosomiformes Family: Leptosomidae

The cuckoo-roller or courol (Leptosomus discolor) is the only bird in the family Leptosomidae, which was previously often placed in the order Coraciiformes but is now placed in its own order Leptosomiformes. Its nearest relative is not clear.

- Cuckoo-roller, Leptosomus discolor

== Trogons ==
Order: Trogoniformes Family: Trogonidae

The family Trogonidae includes trogons and quetzals. Found in tropical woodlands worldwide, they feed on insects and fruit, and their broad bills and weak legs reflect their diet and arboreal habits. Although their flight is fast, they are reluctant to fly any distance. Trogons have soft, often colourful, feathers with distinctive male and female plumage.

- Narina trogon, Apaloderma narina (E)
- Bare-cheeked trogon, Apaloderma aequatoriale (E)
- Bar-tailed trogon, Apaloderma vittatum (E)

== Hoopoes ==
Order: Bucerotiformes Family: Upupidae

Hoopoes have black, white and orangey-pink colour with a large erectile crest on their head.

- Eurasian hoopoe, Upupa epops
- Madagascar hoopoe, Upupa marginata (E-Madagascar)
- St. Helena hoopoe, Upupa antaios (E-St. Helena) extinct

== Woodhoopoes and scimitarbills ==
Order: Bucerotiformes Family: Phoeniculidae

The woodhoopoes and scimitarbills are related to the hoopoes, ground-hornbills, and hornbills. They most resemble the hoopoes with their long curved bills, used to probe for insects, and short rounded wings. However, they differ in that they have metallic plumage, often blue, green or purple, and lack an erectile crest. The entire family is endemic to Africa.

- Green woodhoopoe, Phoeniculus purpureus
- Violet woodhoopoe, Phoeniculus damarensis
- Black-billed woodhoopoe, Phoeniculus somaliensis
- White-headed woodhoopoe, Phoeniculus bollei
- Forest woodhoopoe, Phoeniculus castaneiceps
- Black scimitarbill, Rhinopomastus aterrimus
- Common scimitarbill, Rhinopomastus cyanomelas
- Abyssinian scimitarbill, Rhinopomastus minor

== Ground hornbills ==
Order: Bucerotiformes Family: Bucorvidae

The ground hornbills are terrestrial birds which feed almost entirely on insects, other birds, snakes, and amphibians. The entire family is endemic to Africa.

- Abyssinian ground hornbill, Bucorvus abyssinicus
- Southern ground hornbill, Bucorvus leadbeateri

== Hornbills ==
Order: Bucerotiformes Family: Bucerotidae

Hornbills are a group of birds whose bill is shaped like a cow's horn, but without a twist, sometimes with a casque on the upper mandible. Frequently, the bill is brightly coloured.

- Red-billed dwarf hornbill, Lophoceros camurus (E)
- Crowned hornbill, Lophoceros alboterminatus (E)
- Bradfield's hornbill, Lophoceros bradfieldi (E)
- African pied hornbill, Lophoceros fasciatus (E)
- Hemprich's hornbill, Lophoceros hemprichii (E)
- African grey hornbill, Lophoceros nasutus
- Pale-billed hornbill, Lophoceros pallidirostris (E)
- Eastern yellow-billed hornbill, Tockus flavirostris (E)
- Southern yellow-billed hornbill, Tockus leucomelas (E)
- Jackson's hornbill, Tockus jacksoni (E)
- Von der Decken's hornbill, Tockus deckeni (E)
- Monteiro's hornbill, Tockus monteiri (E)
- Southern red-billed hornbill, Tockus rufirostris (E)
- Damara red-billed hornbill, Tockus damarensis (E)
- Tanzanian red-billed hornbill, Tockus ruahae (E-Tanzania)
- Western red-billed hornbill, Tockus kempi (E)
- Northern red-billed hornbill, Tockus erythrorhynchus (E)
- White-crested hornbill, Horizocerus albocristatus (E)
- Black dwarf hornbill, Horizocerus hartlaubi (E)
- Black-casqued hornbill, Ceratogymna atrata (E)
- Yellow-casqued hornbill, Ceratogymna elata (E)
- Silvery-cheeked hornbill, Bycanistes brevis (E)
- Black-and-white-casqued hornbill, Bycanistes subcylindrica (E)
- Brown-cheeked hornbill, Bycanistes cylindrica (E)
- White-thighed hornbill, Bycanistes albotibialis (E)
- Trumpeter hornbill, Bycanistes bucinator (E)
- Piping hornbill, Bycanistes fistulator (E)

== Kingfishers ==
Order: Coraciiformes Family: Alcedinidae

Kingfishers are medium-sized birds with large heads, long, pointed bills, short legs and stubby tails.

- Common kingfisher, Alcedo atthis
- Half-collared kingfisher, Alcedo semitorquata (E)
- Shining-blue kingfisher, Alcedo quadribrachys (E)
- Malachite kingfisher, Corythornis cristatus
- Malagasy kingfisher, Corythornis vintsioides
- White-bellied kingfisher, Corythornis leucogaster (E)
- Madagascar pygmy kingfisher, Corythornis madagascariensis (E-Madagascar)
- African pygmy kingfisher, Ispidina picta (E)
- African dwarf kingfisher, Ispidina lecontei (E)
- Chocolate-backed kingfisher, Halcyon badia (E)
- White-throated kingfisher, Halcyon smyrnensis (V)
- Grey-headed kingfisher, Halcyon leucocephala
- Woodland kingfisher, Halcyon senegalensis (E)
- Mangrove kingfisher, Halcyon senegaloides (E)
- Blue-breasted kingfisher, Halcyon malimbica (E)
- Brown-hooded kingfisher, Halcyon albiventris (E)
- Striped kingfisher, Halcyon chelicuti (E)
- Collared kingfisher, Todiramphus chloris
- Giant kingfisher, Megaceryle maximus (E)
- Pied kingfisher, Ceryle rudis

== Bee-eaters ==
Order: Coraciiformes Family: Meropidae

The bee-eaters are a group of birds in the family Meropidae. Most species are found in Africa but others occur in southern Europe, Madagascar, Australia and New Guinea. They are characterised by richly coloured plumage, slender bodies and usually elongated central tail feathers. All are colourful and have long downturned bills and pointed wings, which give them a swallow-like appearance when seen from afar.

- Black bee-eater, Merops gularis (E)
- Blue-moustached bee-eater, Merops mentalis (E)
- Blue-headed bee-eater, Merops muelleri (E)
- Red-throated bee-eater, Merops bulocki (E)
- White-fronted bee-eater, Merops bullockoides (E)
- Little bee-eater, Merops pusillus
- Blue-breasted bee-eater, Merops variegatus (E)
- Ethiopian bee-eater, Merops lafresnayii (E)
- Cinnamon-chested bee-eater, Merops oreobates (E)
- Swallow-tailed bee-eater, Merops hirundineus (E)
- Black-headed bee-eater, Merops breweri (E)
- Somali bee-eater, Merops revoilii
- White-throated bee-eater, Merops albicollis
- African green bee-eater, Merops viridissimus
- Böhm's bee-eater, Merops boehmi (E)
- Blue-cheeked bee-eater, Merops persicus
- Madagascar bee-eater, Merops superciliosus
- European bee-eater, Merops apiaster
- Rosy bee-eater, Merops malimbicus (E)
- Northern carmine bee-eater, Merops nubicus (E)
- Southern carmine bee-eater, Merops nubicoides (E)

== Rollers ==
Order: Coraciiformes Family: Coraciidae

Rollers resemble crows in size and build, but are more closely related to the kingfishers and bee-eaters. They share the colourful appearance of those groups with blues and browns predominating. The two inner front toes are connected, but the outer toe is not.

- European roller, Coracias garrulus
- Abyssinian roller, Coracias abyssinicus
- Lilac-breasted roller, Coracias caudatus (E)
- Racket-tailed roller, Coracias spatulatus (E)
- Rufous-crowned roller, Coracias noevius
- Blue-bellied roller, Coracias cyanogaster (E)
- Broad-billed roller, Eurystomus glaucurus
- Blue-throated roller, Eurystomus gularis (E)
- Dollarbird, Eurystomus orientalis

== Ground-rollers ==
Order: Coraciiformes Family: Brachypteraciidae

The ground-rollers are a small family of non-migratory birds restricted to Madagascar. They are related to the kingfishers, bee-eaters and rollers. They most resemble the latter group, and are sometimes considered a sub-family of the true rollers. The entire family is endemic to Madagascar.

- Short-legged ground roller Brachypteracias leptosomus
- Scaly ground roller, Brachypteracias squamigera
- Pitta-like ground roller, Atelornis pittoides
- Rufous-headed ground roller, Atelornis crossleyi
- Long-tailed ground roller, Uratelornis chimaera

== African barbets ==
Order: Piciformes Family: Lybiidae

The African barbets are plump birds, with short necks and large heads. They get their name from the bristles which fringe their heavy bills. Most species are brightly coloured. The entire family is endemic to Africa.

- Yellow-billed barbet, Trachyphonus purpuratus
- Crested barbet, Trachyphonus vaillantii
- Red-and-yellow barbet, Trachyphonus erythrocephalus
- Yellow-breasted barbet, Trachyphonus margaritatus
- D'Arnaud's barbet, Trachyphonus darnaudii
- Grey-throated barbet, Gymnobucco bonapartei
- Sladen's barbet, Gymnobucco sladeni
- Bristle-nosed barbet, Gymnobucco peli
- Naked-faced barbet, Gymnobucco calvus
- White-eared barbet, Stactolaema leucotis
- Whyte's barbet, Stactolaema whytii
- Anchieta's barbet, Stactolaema anchietae
- Green barbet, Stactolaema olivacea
- Speckled tinkerbird, Pogoniulus scolopaceus
- Green tinkerbird, Pogoniulus simplex
- Moustached tinkerbird, Pogoniulus leucomystax
- Western tinkerbird, Pogoniulus coryphaea
- Red-rumped tinkerbird, Pogoniulus atroflavus
- Yellow-throated tinkerbird, Pogoniulus subsulphureus
- Yellow-rumped tinkerbird, Pogoniulus bilineatus
- Red-fronted tinkerbird, Pogoniulus pusillus
- Yellow-fronted tinkerbird, Pogoniulus chrysoconus
- Yellow-spotted barbet, Buccanodon duchaillui
- Hairy-breasted barbet, Tricholaema hirsuta
- Red-fronted barbet, Tricholaema diademata
- Miombo barbet, Tricholaema frontata
- Pied barbet, Tricholaema leucomelas
- Spot-flanked barbet, Tricholaema lachrymosa
- Black-throated barbet, Tricholaema melanocephala
- Banded barbet, Lybius undatus
- Vieillot's barbet, Lybius vieilloti
- White-headed barbet, Lybius leucocephalus
- Chaplin's barbet, Lybius chaplini (E-Zambia)
- Red-faced barbet, Lybius rubrifacies
- Black-billed barbet, Lybius guifsobalito
- Black-collared barbet, Lybius torquatus
- Brown-breasted barbet, Lybius melanopterus
- Black-backed barbet, Lybius minor
- Double-toothed barbet, Lybius bidentatus
- Bearded barbet, Lybius dubius
- Black-breasted barbet, Lybius rolleti

== Honeyguides ==
Order: Piciformes Family: Indicatoridae

Honeyguides are among the few birds that feed on wax. They are named for the greater honeyguide which leads traditional honey-hunters to bees' nests and, after the hunters have harvested the honey, feeds on the remaining contents of the hive. The entire family is endemic to Africa.

- Cassin's honeyguide, Prodotiscus insignis
- Green-backed honeyguide, Prodotiscus zambesiae
- Wahlberg's honeyguide, Prodotiscus regulus
- Zenker's honeyguide, Melignomon zenkeri
- Yellow-footed honeyguide, Melignomon eisentrauti
- Dwarf honeyguide, Indicator pumilio
- Willcocks's honeyguide, Indicator willcocksi
- Pallid honeyguide, Indicator meliphilus
- Least honeyguide, Indicator exilis
- Lesser honeyguide, Indicator minor
- Spotted honeyguide, Indicator maculatus
- Scaly-throated honeyguide, Indicator variegatus
- Greater honeyguide, Indicator indicator
- Lyre-tailed honeyguide, Melichneutes robustus

== Woodpeckers ==
Order: Piciformes Family: Picidae

Woodpeckers are small to medium-sized birds with chisel-like beaks, short legs, stiff tails and long tongues used for capturing insects. Some species have feet with two toes pointing forward and two backward, while several species have only three toes. Many woodpeckers have the habit of tapping noisily on tree trunks with their beaks.

- Eurasian wryneck, Jynx torquilla
- Rufous-necked wryneck, Jynx ruficollis (E)
- African piculet, Verreauxia africana (E)
- Abyssinian woodpecker, Chloropicus abyssinicus (E)
- Melancholy woodpecker, Chloropicus lugubris (E)
- Gabon woodpecker, Chloropicus gabonensis (E)
- Elliot's woodpecker, Chloropicus elliotii (E)
- Little grey woodpecker, Chloropicus elachus (E)
- Speckle-breasted woodpecker, Chloropicus poecilolaemus (E)
- Cardinal woodpecker, Chloropicus fuscescens (E)
- Bearded woodpecker, Chloropicus namaquus (E)
- Fire-bellied woodpecker, Chloropicus pyrrhogaster (E)
- Golden-crowned woodpecker, Chloropicus xantholophus (E)
- Stierling's woodpecker, Chloropicus stierlingi (E)
- Brown-backed woodpecker, Chloropicus obsoletus (E)
- African grey woodpecker, Chloropicus goertae (E)
- Mountain grey woodpecker, Chloropicus spodocephalus (E)
- Olive woodpecker, Chloropicus griseocephalus (E)
- Great spotted woodpecker, Dendrocopos major
- Syrian woodpecker, Dendrocopos syriacus
- Lesser spotted woodpecker, Dryobates minor
- Levaillant's woodpecker, Picus vaillantii (E)
- Ground woodpecker, Geocolaptes olivaceus
- Brown-eared woodpecker, Campethera caroli (E)
- Buff-spotted woodpecker, Campethera nivosa (E)
- Tullberg's woodpecker, Campethera tullbergi (E)
- Little green woodpecker, Campethera maculosa (E)
- Green-backed woodpecker, Campethera cailliautii (E)
- Nubian woodpecker, Campethera nubica (E)
- Fine-spotted woodpecker, Campethera punctuligera (E)
- Bennett's woodpecker, Campethera bennettii (E)
- Reichenow's woodpecker, Campethera scriptoricauda (E)
- Knysna woodpecker, Campethera notata (E)
- Golden-tailed woodpecker, Campethera abingoni (E)
- Mombasa woodpecker, Campethera mombassica (E)

== Falcons and caracaras ==
Order: Falconiformes Family: Falconidae

Falconidae is a family of diurnal birds of prey. They differ from hawks, eagles and kites in that they kill with their beaks instead of their talons.

- Pygmy falcon, Polihierax semitorquatus (E)
- Lesser kestrel, Falco naumanni
- Eurasian kestrel, Falco tinnunculus
- Rock kestrel, Falco rupicolus (E)
- Malagasy kestrel, Falco newtoni (E)
- Mauritius kestrel, Falco punctatus (E-Mauritius)
- Seychelles kestrel, Falco araeus (E-Seychelles)
- Reunion kestrel, Falco duboisi (E-Réunion)
- Greater kestrel, Falco rupicoloides (E)
- Fox kestrel, Falco alopex (E)
- Grey kestrel, Falco ardosiaceus (E)
- Dickinson's kestrel, Falco dickinsoni (E)
- Banded kestrel, Falco zoniventris (E-Madagascar)
- Red-necked falcon, Falco chicquera
- Red-footed falcon, Falco vespertinus
- Amur falcon, Falco amurensis
- Eleonora's falcon, Falco eleonorae
- Sooty falcon, Falco concolor
- Merlin, Falco columbarius
- Eurasian hobby, Falco subbuteo
- African hobby, Falco cuvierii (E)
- Lanner falcon, Falco biarmicus
- Saker falcon, Falco cherrug
- Peregrine falcon, Falco peregrinus
- Taita falcon, Falco fasciinucha (E)

== Old World parrots ==
Order: Psittaciformes Family: Psittaculidae

Characteristic features of parrots include a strong curved bill, an upright stance, strong legs, and clawed zygodactyl feet. Many parrots are vividly coloured, and some are multi-coloured. In size they range from 8 cm (3.1 in) to 1 m (3.3 ft) in length. Old World parrots are found from Africa east across south and southeast Asia and Oceania to Australia and New Zealand.

- Greater vasa parrot, Coracopsis vasa
- Lesser vasa parrot, Coracopsis nigra
- Seychelles parrot, Coracopsis barklyi (E-Seychelles)
- Mascarene parrot, Mascarinus mascarin (E-Mascarene) extinct
- Alexandrine parakeet, Psittacula eupatria (V)
- Seychelles parakeet, Psittacula wardi (E-Seychelles) extinct
- Rose-ringed parakeet, Psittacula krameri
- Echo parakeet, Psittacula eques (E)
- Newton's parakeet, Psittacula exsul (E-Rodrigues) extinct
- Mauritius grey parrot, Lophopsittacus bensoni (E) extinct
- Broad-billed parrot, Lophopsittacus mauritianus (E-Mauritius) extinct
- Rodrigues parrot, Necropsittacus rodricanus (E-Rodrigues) extinct
- Black-collared lovebird, Agapornis swindernianus (E)
- Grey-headed lovebird, Agapornis canus
- Red-headed lovebird, Agapornis pullarius (E)
- Black-winged lovebird, Agapornis taranta (E)
- Rosy-faced lovebird, Agapornis roseicollis
- Fischer's lovebird, Agapornis fischeri
- Yellow-collared lovebird, Agapornis personatus (E-Tanzania)
- Lilian's lovebird, Agapornis lilianae (E)
- Black-cheeked lovebird, Agapornis nigrigenis (E)

== African and New World parrots ==
Order: Psittaciformes Family: Psittacidae

Characteristic features of parrots include a strong curved bill, an upright stance, strong legs, and clawed zygodactyl feet. Many parrots are vividly coloured, and some are multi-coloured. In size they range from 8 cm (3.1 in) to 1 m (3.3 ft) in length. Most of the more than 150 species in this family are found in the New World.

- Grey parrot, Psittacus erithacus (E)
- Brown-necked parrot, Poicephalus fuscicollis (E)
- Cape parrot, Poicephalus robustus (E-South Africa)
- Red-fronted parrot, Poicephalus gulielmi (E)
- Meyer's parrot, Poicephalus meyeri (E)
- Rüppell's parrot, Poicephalus rueppellii (E)
- Brown-headed parrot, Poicephalus cryptoxanthus (E)
- Niam-Niam parrot, Poicephalus crassus (E)
- Red-bellied parrot, Poicephalus rufiventris (E)
- Senegal parrot, Poicephalus senegalus (E)
- Yellow-fronted parrot, Poicephalus flavifrons (E-Ethiopia)
- Monk parakeet, Myiopsitta monachus (I)
- Dusky parrot, Pionus fuscus (V)

== African and green broadbills ==
Order: Passeriformes Family: Calyptomenidae

Broadbills are small, brightly coloured birds, which feed on fruit and also take insects in flycatcher fashion, snapping their broad bills. Their habitat is canopies of wet forests.

- African broadbill, Smithornis capensis (E)
- Grey-headed broadbill, Smithornis sharpei (E)
- Rufous-sided broadbill, Smithornis rufolateralis (E)

== Asian and Grauer's broadbills ==
Order: Passeriformes Family: Eurylaimidae

Eurylaimidae formerly included the sapayoa from the Neotropics, the asities from Madagascar, and the Calyptomenidae from Africa and Asia, but these are now separated into distinct families.

- Grauer's broadbill, Pseudocalyptomena graueri (E)

== Asities ==
Order: Passeriformes Family: Philepittidae

The asities are a family of birds, Philepittidae, that are endemic to Madagascar. The asities consist of four species in two genera. The Neodrepanis species are known as sunbird-asities and were formerly known as false sunbirds. They are all endemic to Madagascar.

- Velvet asity, Philepitta castanea
- Schlegel's asity, Philepitta schlegeli
- Common sunbird-asity, Neodrepanis coruscans
- Yellow-bellied sunbird-asity, Neodrepanis hypoxanthus

== Pittas ==
Order: Passeriformes Family: Pittidae

Pittas are medium-sized by passerine standards and are stocky, with fairly long, strong legs, short tails and stout bills. Many are brightly coloured. They spend the majority of their time on wet forest floors, eating snails, insects and similar invertebrates.

- African pitta, Pitta angolensis (E)
- Green-breasted pitta, Pitta reichenowi (E)

== Cuckooshrikes ==
Order: Passeriformes Family: Campephagidae

Cuckooshrikes are small to medium-sized passerine birds. They are predominantly greyish with white and black, although some species are brightly coloured. All of the listed species are endemic to Africa.

- Comoros cuckooshrike, Coracina cucullata (E-Comoros)
- Madagascar cuckooshrike, Coracina cinerea (E)
- Grauer's cuckooshrike, Coracina graueri
- Grey cuckooshrike, Coracina caesia
- White-breasted cuckooshrike, Coracina pectoralis
- Ghana cuckooshrike, Campephaga lobata
- Oriole cuckooshrike, Campephaga oriolina
- Black cuckooshrike, Campephaga flava
- Petit's cuckooshrike, Campephaga petiti
- Red-shouldered cuckooshrike, Campephaga phoenicea
- Purple-throated cuckooshrike, Campephaga quiscalina
- Reunion cuckooshrike, Lalage newtoni (E-Réunion)
- Mauritius cuckooshrike, Lalage typica (E-Mauritius)
- Blue cuckooshrike, Cyanograucalus azureus

== Vireos, shrike-babblers, and erpornis ==
Order: Passeriformes Family: Vireonidae

The vireos are a group of small to medium-sized passerine birds restricted to the New World and Southeast Asia.

- Red-eyed vireo, Vireo olivaceus (V)

== Old World orioles ==
Order: Passeriformes Family: Oriolidae

Old World orioles are colourful passerine birds. They are not related to the New World orioles.

- Eurasian golden oriole, Oriolus oriolus
- African golden oriole, Oriolus auratus (E)
- Green-headed oriole, Oriolus chlorocephalus (E)
- Sao Tome oriole, Oriolus crassirostris (E-São Tomé and Príncipe)
- Western black-headed oriole, Oriolus brachyrhynchus (E)
- Ethiopian black-headed oriole, Oriolus monacha (E)
- African black-headed oriole, Oriolus larvatus (E)
- Black-tailed oriole, Oriolus percivali (E)
- Black-winged oriole, Oriolus nigripennis (E)

== Wattle-eyes and batises ==
Order: Passeriformes Family: Platysteiridae

Wattle-eyes, or puffback flycatchers, are small stout passerine birds of the African tropics. They get their name from the brightly coloured fleshy eye decorations found in most species in this group. The entire family is endemic to Africa.

- White-tailed shrike, Lanioturdus torquatus
- Brown-throated wattle-eye, Platysteira cyanea
- White-fronted wattle-eye, Platysteira albifrons
- Black-throated wattle-eye, Platysteira peltata
- Banded wattle-eye, Platysteira laticincta (E-Cameroon)
- Chestnut wattle-eye, Platysteira castanea
- West African wattle-eye, Platysteira hormophora
- White-spotted wattle-eye, Platysteira tonsa
- Red-cheeked wattle-eye, Platysteira blissetti
- Black-necked wattle-eye, Platysteira chalybea
- Jameson's wattle-eye, Platysteira jamesoni
- Yellow-bellied wattle-eye, Platysteira concreta
- Boulton's batis, Batis margaritae
- Short-tailed batis, Batis mixta
- Dark batis, Batis crypta
- Rwenzori batis, Batis diops
- Cape batis, Batis capensis
- Woodward's batis, Batis fratrum
- Chinspot batis, Batis molitor
- Pale batis, Batis soror
- Pririt batis, Batis pririt
- Senegal batis, Batis senegalensis
- Grey-headed batis, Batis orientalis
- Western black-headed batis, Batis erlangeri
- Eastern black-headed batis, Batis minor
- Pygmy batis, Batis perkeo
- Verreaux's batis, Batis minima
- Ituri batis, Batis ituriensis
- Bioko batis, Batis poensis (E-Equatorial Guinea)
- West African batis, Batis occulta
- Angola batis, Batis minulla

== Vangas and helmetshrikes ==
Order: Passeriformes Family: Vangidae

Helmetshrikes are similar in build to the shrikes, but tend to be colourful species with distinctive crests or other head ornaments, such as wattles, from which they get their name. All of the listed species are endemic to Africa.

- White helmetshrike, Prionops plumatus
- Grey-crested helmetshrike, Prionops poliolophus
- Yellow-crested helmetshrike, Prionops alberti
- Red-billed helmetshrike, Prionops caniceps
- Rufous-bellied helmetshrike, Prionops rufiventris
- Retz's helmetshrike, Prionops retzii
- Angola helmetshrike, Prionops gabela
- Chestnut-fronted helmetshrike, Prionops scopifrons
- African shrike-flycatcher, Megabyas flammulatus
- Black-and-white shrike-flycatcher, Bias musicus
- Archbold's newtonia, Newtonia archboldi (E-Madagascar)
- Common newtonia, Newtonia brunneicauda (E-Madagascar)
- Dark newtonia, Newtonia amphichroa (E-Madagascar)
- Red-tailed newtonia, Newtonia fanovanae (E-Madagascar)
- Tylas vanga, Tylas eduardi (E-Madagascar)
- Red-tailed vanga, Calicalicus madagascariensis (E-Madagascar)
- Red-shouldered vanga, Calicalicus rufocarpalis (E-Madagascar)
- Nuthatch-vanga, Hypositta corallirostris (E-Madagascar)
- Chabert vanga, Leptopterus chabert (E-Madagascar)
- Crossley's vanga, Mystacornis crossleyi (E-Madagascar)
- Blue vanga, Cyanolanius madagascarinus (E)
- Hook-billed vanga, Vanga curvirostris (E-Madagascar)
- Ward's flycatcher, Pseudobias wardi (E-Madagascar)
- Rufous vanga, Schetba rufa (E-Madagascar)
- Helmet vanga, Euryceros prevostii (E-Madagascar)
- Bernier's vanga, Oriolia bernieri (E-Madagascar)
- Sickle-billed vanga, Falculea palliata (E-Madagascar)
- White-headed vanga, Artamella viridis (E-Madagascar)
- Pollen's vanga, Xenopirostris polleni (E-Madagascar)
- Lafresnaye's vanga, Xenopirostris xenopirostris (E-Madagascar)
- Van Dam's vanga, Xenopirostris damii (E-Madagascar)

== Bushshrikes and allies ==
Order: Passeriformes Family: Malaconotidae

Bushshrikes are similar in habits to shrikes, hunting insects and other small prey from a perch on a bush. Although similar in build to the shrikes, these tend to be either colourful species or largely black; some species are quite secretive. All of the listed species except black-crowned tchagra are endemic to Africa.

- Brubru, Nilaus afer
- Northern puffback, Dryoscopus gambensis
- Pringle's puffback, Dryoscopus pringlii
- Black-backed puffback, Dryoscopus cubla
- Red-eyed puffback, Dryoscopus senegalensis
- Pink-footed puffback, Dryoscopus angolensis
- Sabine's puffback, Dryoscopus sabini
- Marsh tchagra, Tchagra minutus
- Black-crowned tchagra, Tchagra senegalus
- Brown-crowned tchagra, Tchagra australis
- Three-streaked tchagra, Tchagra jamesi
- Southern tchagra, Tchagra tchagra
- Red-naped bushshrike, Laniarius ruficeps
- Coastal boubou, Laniarius nigerrimus
- Lühder's bushshrike, Laniarius luehderi
- Braun's bushshrike, Laniarius brauni (E-Angola)
- Gabela bushshrike, Laniarius amboimensis (E-Angola)
- Turati's boubou, Laniarius turatii
- Ethiopian boubou, Laniarius aethiopicus (see note below) (Note: The ABC checklist contains tropical boubou with the scientific name L. aethiopicus, which Clements assigns to Ethiopian boubou. Clements lists both species as present in Africa so they are included here.)
- Tropical boubou, Laniarius major
- Zanzibar boubou, Laniarius sublacteus
- Gabon boubou, Laniarius bicolor
- Southern boubou, Laniarius ferrugineus
- Yellow-crowned gonolek, Laniarius barbarus
- Black-headed gonolek, Laniarius erythrogaster
- Crimson-breasted gonolek, Laniarius atrococcineus
- Papyrus gonolek, Laniarius mufumbiri
- Yellow-breasted boubou, Laniarius atroflavus
- Slate-coloured boubou, Laniarius funebris
- Lowland sooty boubou, Laniarius leucorhynchus
- Willard's sooty boubou, Laniarius willardi
- Western boubou, Laniarius poensis
- Albertine boubou, Laniarius holomelas
- Fülleborn's boubou, Laniarius fuelleborni
- Rosy-patched bushshrike, Rhodophoneus cruentus
- Bokmakierie, Telophorus zeylonus
- Grey-green bushshrike, Telophorus bocagei
- Sulphur-breasted bushshrike, Telophorus sulfureopectus
- Olive bushshrike, Telophorus olivaceus
- Many-coloured bushshrike, Telophorus multicolor
- Black-fronted bushshrike, Telophorus nigrifrons
- Mount Kupe bushshrike, Telophorus kupeensis (E-Cameroon)
- Four-coloured bushshrike, Telophorus viridis
- Doherty's bushshrike, Telophorus dohertyi
- Fiery-breasted bushshrike, Malaconotus cruentus
- Lagden's bushshrike, Malaconotus lagdeni
- Green-breasted bushshrike, Malaconotus gladiator
- Grey-headed bushshrike, Malaconotus blanchoti
- Monteiro's bushshrike, Malaconotus monteiri
- Uluguru bushshrike, Malaconotus alius (E-Tanzania)

== Drongos ==
Order: Passeriformes Family: Dicruridae

Drongos are mostly black or dark grey in colour, sometimes with metallic tints. They have long forked tails, and some Asian species have elaborate tail decorations. They have short legs and sit very upright when perched, like a shrike. They flycatch or take prey from the ground. All of the listed species are endemic to Africa.

- Western square-tailed drongo, Dicrurus occidentalis
- Sharpe's drongo, Dicrurus sharpei
- Common square-tailed drongo, Dicrurus ludwigii
- Shining drongo, Dicrurus atripennis
- Fork-tailed drongo, Dicrurus adsimilis
- Glossy-backed drongo, Dicrurus divaricatus
- Fanti drongo, Dicrurus atactus
- Velvet-mantled drongo, Dicrurus modestus
- Aldabra drongo, Dicrurus aldabranus (E-Aldabra)
- Comoro drongo, Dicrurus fuscipennis (E-Comoros)
- Crested drongo, Dicrurus forficatus (E)
- Mayotte drongo, Dicrurus waldenii (E-Mayotte)
- Hair-crested drongo, Dicrurus hottentottus (V)

== Monarch flycatchers ==
Order: Passeriformes Family: Monarchidae

Monarch flycatchers are small to medium-sized insectivorous passerines which hunt by flycatching.

- Blue-headed crested flycatcher, Trochocercus nitens (E)
- African crested flycatcher, Trochocercus cyanomelas (E)
- Mascarene paradise flycatcher, Terpsiphone bourbonnensis (E-Mascarene islands)
- Sao Tome paradise flycatcher, Terpsiphone atrochalybeia (E-São Tomé and Príncipe)
- Seychelles paradise flycatcher, Terpsiphone corvina (E-Seychelles)
- Malagasy paradise flycatcher, Terpsiphone mutata (E)
- Black-headed paradise flycatcher, Terpsiphone rufiventer (E)
- Bedford's paradise flycatcher, Terpsiphone bedfordi (E-Democratic Republic of the Congo)
- Rufous-vented paradise flycatcher, Terpsiphone rufocinerea (E)
- Bates's paradise flycatcher, Terpsiphone batesi (E)
- African paradise flycatcher, Terpsiphone viridis

== Shrikes ==
Order: Passeriformes Family: Laniidae

Shrikes are passerine birds known for their habit of catching other birds and small animals and impaling the uneaten portions of their bodies on thorns. A shrike's beak is hooked, like that of a typical bird of prey.

- Red-backed shrike, Lanius collurio
- Red-tailed shrike, Lanius phoenicuroides
- Isabelline shrike, Lanius isabellinus
- Brown shrike, Lanius cristatus (V)
- Emin's shrike, Lanius gubernator (E)
- Iberian grey shrike, Lanius meridionalis (V)
- Great grey shrike, Lanius excubitor
- Lesser grey shrike, Lanius minor
- Grey-backed fiscal, Lanius excubitoroides (E)
- Long-tailed fiscal, Lanius cabanisi (E)
- Yellow-billed shrike, Lanius corvinus (E)
- Magpie shrike, Lanius melanoleucus (E)
- Taita fiscal, Lanius dorsalis (E)
- Somali fiscal, Lanius somalicus (E)
- Mackinnon's shrike, Lanius mackinnoni (E)
- Northern fiscal, Lanius humeralis (E)
- Southern fiscal, Lanius collaris (E)
- Souza's shrike, Lanius souzae (E)
- Newton's fiscal, Lanius newtoni (E)
- Masked shrike, Lanius nubicus
- Woodchat shrike, Lanius senator
- White-rumped shrike, Eurocephalus ruppelli (E)
- White-crowned shrike, Eurocephalus anguitimens (E)

== Crows, jays, and magpies ==
Order: Passeriformes Family: Corvidae

The family Corvidae includes crows, ravens, jays, choughs, magpies, treepies, nutcrackers and ground jays. Corvids are above average in size among the Passeriformes, and some of the larger species show high levels of intelligence.

- Eurasian jay, Garrulus glandarius
- Maghreb magpie, Pica mauritanica (E)
- Eurasian magpie, Pica pica
- Stresemann's bush crow, Zavattariornis stresemanni (E-Ethiopia)
- Eurasian nutcracker, Nucifraga caryocatactes (V)
- Red-billed chough, Pyrrhocorax pyrrhocorax
- Yellow-billed chough, Pyrrhocorax graculus
- Piapiac, Ptilostomus afer (E)
- Eurasian jackdaw, Corvus monedula
- House crow, Corvus splendens
- Cape crow, Corvus capensis (E)
- Rook, Corvus frugilegus
- Carrion crow, Corvus corone (V)
- Hooded crow, Corvus cornix
- Pied crow, Corvus albus
- Brown-necked raven, Corvus ruficollis
- Somali crow, Corvus edithae (E)
- Fan-tailed raven, Corvus rhipidurus
- White-necked raven, Corvus albicollis (E)
- Thick-billed raven, Corvus crassirostris (E)
- Common raven, Corvus corax

== Rockfowl ==
Order: Passeriformes Family: Picathartidae

Rockfowl are lanky birds with crow-like bills, long necks, tails and legs, and strong feet adapted to terrestrial feeding. They are similar in size and structure to the completely unrelated roadrunners, but they hop rather than walk. They also have brightly coloured unfeathered heads. The entire family is endemic to Africa.

- White-necked rockfowl, Picathartes gymnocephalus
- Grey-necked rockfowl, Picathartes oreas

== Rockjumpers ==
Order: Passeriformes Family: Chaetopidae

These two species are the only two in their family. They are primarily insectivores, but cape rockjumpers also eat small vertebrates. The entire family is endemic to Africa.

- Cape rockjumper, Chaetops frenatus (E-South Africa)
- Drakensberg rockjumper, Chaetops aurantius

== Hyliotas ==
Order: Passeriformes Family: Hyliotidae

The members of this small family, all of genus Hyliota, are birds of the forest canopy. They tend to feed in mixed-species flocks. The entire family is endemic to Africa.

- Yellow-bellied hyliota, Hyliota flavigaster
- Southern hyliota, Hyliota australis
- Usambara hyliota, Hyliota usambarae (E-Tanzania)
- Violet-backed hyliota, Hyliota violacea

== Fairy flycatchers ==
Order: Passeriformes Family: Stenostiridae

Most of the species of this small family are found in Africa, though a few inhabit tropical Asia. They are not closely related to other birds called "flycatchers". All of the listed species are endemic to Africa.

- Fairy flycatcher, Stenostira scita
- African blue flycatcher, Elminia longicauda
- White-tailed blue flycatcher, Elminia albicauda
- Dusky crested flycatcher, Elminia nigromitrata
- White-bellied crested flycatcher, Elminia albiventris
- White-tailed crested flycatcher, Elminia albonotata

== Tits, chickadees, and titmice ==
Order: Passeriformes Family: Paridae

The Paridae are mainly small stocky woodland species with short stout bills. Some have crests. They are adaptable birds, with a mixed diet including seeds and insects.

- Coal tit, Periparus ater
- Crested tit, Lophophanes cristatus (V)
- African blue tit, Cyanistes teneriffae
- Great tit, Parus major
- White-shouldered black tit, Melaniparus guineensis (E)
- White-winged black tit, Melaniparus leucomelas (E)
- Rufous-bellied tit, Melaniparus rufiventris (E)
- White-bellied tit, Melaniparus albiventris (E)
- Southern black tit, Melaniparus niger (E)
- Carp's tit, Melaniparus carpi (E)
- Dusky tit, Melaniparus funereus (E)
- Miombo tit, Melaniparus griseiventris (E)
- Stripe-breasted tit, Melaniparus fasciiventer (E)
- Somali tit, Melaniparus thruppi (E)
- Red-throated tit, Melaniparus fringillinus (E)
- White-backed black tit, Melaniparus leuconotus (E)
- Ashy tit, Melaniparus cinerascens (E)
- Grey tit, Melaniparus afer (E)

== Penduline tits ==
Order: Passeriformes Family: Remizidae

The penduline tits are a group of small passerine birds related to the true tits. They are insectivores.

- Eurasian penduline tit, Remiz pendulinus (V)
- Sennar penduline tit, Anthoscopus punctifrons (E)
- Mouse-coloured penduline tit, Anthoscopus musculus (E)
- Yellow penduline tit, Anthoscopus parvulus (E)
- Forest penduline tit, Anthoscopus flavifrons (E)
- African penduline tit, Anthoscopus caroli (E)
- Southern penduline tit, Anthoscopus minutus (E)

== Larks ==
Order: Passeriformes Family: Alaudidae

Larks are small terrestrial birds with often extravagant songs and display flights. Most larks are fairly dull in appearance. Their food is insects and seeds.

- Greater hoopoe lark, Alaemon alaudipes
- Lesser hoopoe lark, Alaemon hamertoni (E-Somalia)
- Spike-heeled lark, Chersomanes albofasciata (E)
- Gray's lark, Ammomanopsis grayi (E)
- Short-clawed lark, Certhilauda chuana (E)
- Karoo long-billed lark, Certhilauda subcoronata (E)
- Eastern long-billed lark, Certhilauda semitorquata (E-South Africa)
- Cape lark, Certhilauda curvirostris (E)
- Rufous-rumped lark, Pinarocorys erythropygia (E)
- Dusky lark, Pinarocorys nigricans (E)
- Thick-billed lark, Ramphocoris clotbey
- Bar-tailed lark, Ammomanes cinctura
- Desert lark, Ammomanes deserti
- Black-eared sparrow-lark, Eremopterix australis (E)
- Madagascar lark, Eremopterix hova (E-Madagascar)
- Chestnut-backed sparrow-lark, Eremopterix leucotis (E)
- Black-crowned sparrow-lark, Eremopterix nigriceps
- Chestnut-headed sparrow-lark, Eremopterix signatus
- Grey-backed sparrow-lark, Eremopterix verticalis (E)
- Fischer's sparrow-lark, Eremopterix leucopareia (E)
- Sabota lark, Calendulauda sabota (E)
- Pink-breasted lark, Calendulauda poecilosterna (E)
- Fawn-coloured lark, Calendulauda africanoides (E)
- Karoo lark, Calendulauda albescens (E)
- Red lark, Calendulauda burra (E-South Africa)
- Barlow's lark, Calendulauda barlowi (E)
- Dune lark, Calendulauda erythrochlamys (E-Namibia)
- Liben lark, Heteromirafra archeri (E)
- Rudd's lark, Heteromirafra ruddi (E-South Africa)
- Cape clapper lark, Mirafra apiata (E)
- Eastern clapper lark, Mirafra fasciolata (E)
- Collared lark, Mirafra collaris (E)
- Red-winged lark, Mirafra hypermetra (E)
- Rufous-naped lark, Mirafra africana (E)
- Ash's lark, Mirafra ashi (E-Somalia)
- Somali long-billed lark, Mirafra somalica (E-Somalia)
- Angola lark, Mirafra angolensis (E)
- Flappet lark, Mirafra rufocinnamomea (E)
- Kordofan lark, Mirafra cordofanica (E)
- Williams's lark, Mirafra williamsi (E-Kenya)
- Friedmann's lark, Mirafra pulpa (E)
- Monotonous lark, Mirafra passerina (E)
- White-tailed lark, Mirafra albicauda (E)
- Latakoo lark, Mirafra cheniana (E)
- Horsfield's bushlark, Mirafra javanica
- Rusty lark, Mirafra rufa (E)
- Gillett's lark, Mirafra gilletti (E)
- Horned lark, Eremophila alpestris
- Temminck's lark, Eremophila bilopha
- Blanford's lark, Calandrella blanfordi
- Rufous-capped lark, Calandrella eremica
- Red-capped lark, Calandrella cinerea
- Greater short-toed lark, Calandrella brachydactyla
- Bimaculated lark, Melanocorypha bimaculata
- Calandra lark, Melanocorypha calandra
- Dupont's lark, Chersophilus duponti
- Dunn's lark, Eremalauda dunni
- Somali short-toed lark, Alaudala somalica (E)
- Mediterranean short-toed lark, Alaudala rufescens
- Turkestan short-toed lark, Alaudala heinei
- Wood lark, Lullula arborea
- Stark's lark, Spizocorys starki (E)
- Sclater's lark, Spizocorys sclateri (E)
- Short-tailed lark, Spizocorys fremantlii (E)
- Pink-billed lark, Spizocorys conirostris (E)
- Botha's lark, Spizocorys fringillaris (E-South Africa)
- Obbia lark, Spizocorys obbiensis (E-Somalia)
- Masked lark, Spizocorys personata (E)
- Eurasian skylark, Alauda arvensis
- Oriental skylark, Alauda gulgula
- Razo skylark, Alauda razae (E-Cape Verde)
- Sun lark, Galerida modesta (E)
- Large-billed lark, Galerida magnirostris (E)
- Thekla's lark, Galerida theklae
- Crested lark, Galerida cristata

== Bearded reedling ==
Order: Passeriformes Family: Panuridae

The bearded reedling was formerly placed in the Old World babbler family Timaliidae, but is now in its own family, Panuridae.

- Bearded reedling, Panurus biarmicus (V)

== Nicators ==
Order: Passeriformes Family: Nicatoridae

Nicators are shrike-like, with hooked bills. They are endemic to sub-Saharan Africa.

- Western nicator, Nicator chloris
- Eastern nicator, Nicator gularis
- Yellow-throated nicator, Nicator vireo

== African warblers ==
Order: Passeriformes Family: Macrosphenidae

African warblers are small to medium-sized insectivores which are found in a wide variety of habitats south of the Sahara.

- Green crombec, Sylvietta virens (E)
- Lemon-bellied crombec, Sylvietta denti (E)
- White-browed crombec, Sylvietta leucophrys (E)
- Northern crombec, Sylvietta brachyura (E)
- Short-billed crombec, Sylvietta philippae (E)
- Red-capped crombec, Sylvietta ruficapilla (E)
- Red-faced crombec, Sylvietta whytii (E)
- Somali crombec, Sylvietta isabellina (E)
- Cape crombec, Sylvietta rufescens (E)
- Rockrunner, Achaetops pycnopygius (E)
- Moustached grass warbler, Melocichla mentalis
- Cape grassbird, Sphenoeacus afer (E)
- Victorin's warbler, Cryptillas victorini (E-South Africa)
- Kemp's longbill, Macrosphenus kempi (E)
- Yellow longbill, Macrosphenus flavicans (E)
- Grey longbill, Macrosphenus concolor (E)
- Pulitzer's longbill, Macrosphenus pulitzeri (E-Angola)
- Kretschmer's longbill, Macrosphenus kretschmeri (E)
- Grauer's warbler, Graueria vittata (E)
- Green hylia, Hylia prasina (E)
- Tit hylia, Pholidornis rushiae (E)

== Cisticolas and allies ==
Order: Passeriformes Family: Cisticolidae

The Cisticolidae are warblers found mainly in warmer southern regions of the Old World. They are generally very small birds of drab brown or grey appearance found in open country such as grassland or scrub.

- Common jery, Neomixis tenella (E-Madagascar)
- Green jery, Neomixis viridis (E-Madagascar)
- Stripe-throated jery, Neomixis striatigula (E-Madagascar)
- Salvadori's eremomela, Eremomela salvadorii (E)
- Yellow-vented eremomela, Eremomela flavicrissalis (E)
- Yellow-bellied eremomela, Eremomela icteropygialis (E)
- Senegal eremomela, Eremomela pusilla (E)
- Green-backed eremomela, Eremomela canescens (E)
- Greencap eremomela, Eremomela scotops (E)
- Yellow-rumped eremomela, Eremomela gregalis (E)
- Rufous-crowned eremomela, Eremomela badiceps (E)
- Turner's eremomela, Eremomela turneri (E)
- Black-necked eremomela, Eremomela atricollis (E)
- Burnt-neck eremomela, Eremomela usticollis (E)
- Red-winged grey warbler, Drymocichla incana (E)
- Sierra Leone prinia, Schistolais leontica (E)
- White-chinned prinia, Schistolais leucopogon (E)
- Roberts's warbler, Oreophilais robertsi (E)
- Namaqua warbler, Phragmacia substriata (E)
- Green longtail, Urolais epichlorus (E)
- Black-collared apalis, Oreolais pulchrer (E)
- Rwenzori apalis, Oreolais ruwenzorii (E)
- African tailorbird, Artisornis metopias (E)
- Long-billed tailorbird, Artisornis moreaui (E)
- Mozambique forest warbler, Artisornis sousae (E)
- White-tailed warbler, Poliolais lopezi (E)
- Miombo wren-warbler, Calamonastes undosus (E)
- Stierling's wren-warbler, Calamonastes stierlingi (E)
- Grey wren-warbler, Calamonastes simplex (E)
- Barred wren-warbler, Calamonastes fasciolatus (E)
- Green-backed camaroptera, Camaroptera brachyura (E)
- Hartert's camaroptera, Camaroptera harterti (E)
- Yellow-browed camaroptera, Camaroptera superciliaris (E)
- Olive-green camaroptera, Camaroptera chloronota (E)
- Cricket longtail, Spiloptila clamans (E)
- Buff-bellied warbler, Phyllolais pulchella (E)
- Bar-throated apalis, Apalis thoracica (E)
- Taita apalis, Apalis fuscigularis (E-Kenya)
- Yellow-throated apalis, Apalis flavigularis (E)
- Namuli apalis, Apalis lynesi (E-Mozambique)
- Black-capped apalis, Apalis nigriceps (E)
- Black-throated apalis, Apalis jacksoni (E)
- White-winged apalis, Apalis chariessa (E)
- Masked apalis, Apalis binotata (E)
- Black-faced apalis, Apalis personata (E)
- Yellow-breasted apalis, Apalis flavida (E)
- Rudd's apalis, Apalis ruddi (E)
- Sharpe's apalis, Apalis sharpii (E)
- Buff-throated apalis, Apalis rufogularis (E)
- Kungwe apalis, Apalis argentea (E)
- Bamenda apalis, Apalis bamendae (E-Cameroon)
- Gosling's apalis, Apalis goslingi (E)
- Kabobo apalis, Apalis kaboboensis (E-Democratic Republic of the Congo)
- Chestnut-throated apalis, Apalis porphyrolaema (E)
- Chapin's apalis, Apalis chapini (E)
- Black-headed apalis, Apalis melanocephala (E)
- Chirinda apalis, Apalis chirindensis (E)
- Grey apalis, Apalis cinerea (E)
- Brown-headed apalis, Apalis alticola (E)
- Karamoja apalis, Apalis karamojae (E)
- Graceful prinia, Prinia gracilis
- Tawny-flanked prinia, Prinia subflava (E)
- Pale prinia, Prinia somalica (E)
- River prinia, Prinia fluviatilis (E)
- Black-chested prinia, Prinia flavicans (E)
- Karoo prinia, Prinia maculosa (E)
- Drakensberg prinia, Prinia hypoxantha (E)
- Sao Tome prinia, Prinia molleri (E-São Tomé and Príncipe)
- Banded prinia, Prinia bairdii (E)
- Red-winged prinia, Prinia erythroptera (E)
- Red-fronted prinia, Prinia rufifrons (E)
- Kopje warbler, Euryptila subcinnamomea (E)
- Mrs. Moreau's warbler, Scepomycter winifredae (E-Tanzania)
- Socotra warbler, Incana incana (E)
- Rufous-eared warbler, Malcorus pectoralis (E)
- Black-capped rufous warbler, Bathmocercus cerviniventris (E)
- Black-faced rufous warbler, Bathmocercus rufus (E)
- Oriole warbler, Hypergerus atriceps (E)
- Grey-capped warbler, Eminia lepida (E)
- Red-faced cisticola, Cisticola erythrops (E)
- Singing cisticola, Cisticola cantans (E)
- Whistling cisticola, Cisticola lateralis (E)
- Chattering cisticola, Cisticola anonymus (E)
- Trilling cisticola, Cisticola woosnami (E)
- Bubbling cisticola, Cisticola bulliens (E)
- Chubb's cisticola, Cisticola chubbi (E)
- Hunter's cisticola, Cisticola hunteri (E)
- Black-lored cisticola, Cisticola nigriloris (E)
- Kilombero cisticola, Cisticola bakerorum (E-Tanzania)
- Rock-loving cisticola, Cisticola aberrans (E)
- Boran cisticola, Cisticola bodessa (E)
- Rattling cisticola, Cisticola chiniana (E)
- Ashy cisticola, Cisticola cinereolus (E)
- Red-pate cisticola, Cisticola ruficeps (E)
- Dorst's cisticola, Cisticola guinea (E)
- Tinkling cisticola, Cisticola rufilatus (E)
- Red-headed cisticola, Cisticola subruficapilla (E)
- Wailing cisticola, Cisticola lais (E)
- Tana River cisticola, Cisticola restrictus (E-Kenya)
- Churring cisticola, Cisticola njombe (E)
- Coastal cisticola, Cisticola haematocephalus (E)
- White-tailed cisticola, Cisticola anderseni (E-Tanzania)
- Luapula cisticola, Cisticola luapula (E)
- Chirping cisticola, Cisticola pipiens (E)
- Ethiopian cisticola, Cisticola lugubris (E-Ethiopia)
- Winding cisticola, Cisticola galactotes (E)
- Rufous-winged cisticola, Cisticola galactotes (E)
- Carruthers's cisticola, Cisticola carruthersi (E)
- Levaillant's cisticola, Cisticola tinniens (E)
- Stout cisticola, Cisticola robustus (E)
- Croaking cisticola, Cisticola natalensis (E)
- Piping cisticola, Cisticola fulvicapilla (E)
- Aberdare cisticola, Cisticola aberdare (E-Kenya)
- Tabora cisticola, Cisticola angusticauda (E)
- Slender-tailed cisticola, Cisticola melanurus (E)
- Siffling cisticola, Cisticola brachypterus (E)
- Rufous cisticola, Cisticola rufus (E)
- Foxy cisticola, Cisticola troglodytes (E)
- Tiny cisticola, Cisticola nanus (E)
- Zitting cisticola, Cisticola juncidis
- Socotra cisticola, Cisticola haesitatus (E)
- Madagascar cisticola, Cisticola cherina (E)
- Desert cisticola, Cisticola aridulus (E)
- Cloud cisticola, Cisticola textrix (E)
- Black-backed cisticola, Cisticola eximius (E)
- Cloud-scraping cisticola, Cisticola dambo (E)
- Pectoral-patch cisticola, Cisticola brunnescens (E)
- Pale-crowned cisticola, Cisticola cinnamomeus (E)
- Wing-snapping cisticola, Cisticola ayresii (E)

== Reed warblers and allies ==
Order: Passeriformes Family: Acrocephalidae

The members of this family are usually rather large for "warblers". Most are rather plain olivaceous brown above with much yellow to beige below. They are usually found in open woodland, reedbeds, or tall grass. The family occurs mostly in southern to western Eurasia and surroundings, but it also ranges far into the Pacific, with some species in Africa.

- Aldabra brush warbler, Nesillas aldabrana (E-Aldabra) extinct
- Malagasy brush warbler, Nesillas typica (E)
- Subdesert brush warbler, Nesillas lantzii (E-Madagascar)
- Grand Comoro brush warbler, Nesillas brevicaudata (E)
- Moheli brush warbler, Nesillas mariae (E-Comoros)
- Papyrus yellow warbler, Calamonastides gracilirostris (E)
- Thick-billed warbler, Arundinax aedon (V)
- Booted warbler, Iduna caligata
- Sykes's warbler, Iduna rama (V)
- Eastern olivaceous warbler, Iduna pallida
- Western olivaceous warbler, Iduna opaca
- African yellow warbler, Iduna natalensis (E)
- Mountain yellow warbler, Iduna similis (E)
- Upcher's warbler, Hippolais languida
- Olive-tree warbler, Hippolais olivetorum
- Melodious warbler, Hippolais polyglotta
- Icterine warbler, Hippolais icterina
- Aquatic warbler, Acrocephalus paludicola
- Moustached warbler, Acrocephalus melanopogon
- Sedge warbler, Acrocephalus schoenobaenus
- Blyth's reed warbler, Acrocephalus dumetorum (V)
- Marsh warbler, Acrocephalus palustris
- Common reed warbler, Acrocephalus scirpaceus
- Basra reed warbler, Acrocephalus griseldis
- Lesser swamp warbler, Acrocephalus gracilirostris (E)
- Greater swamp warbler, Acrocephalus rufescens (E)
- Cape Verde swamp warbler, Acrocephalus brevipennis (E-Cape Verde)
- Madagascar swamp warbler, Acrocephalus newtoni (E-Madagascar)
- Rodrigues warbler, Acrocephalus rodericanus (E-Rodrigues)
- Seychelles warbler, Acrocephalus sechellensis (E-Seychelles)
- Great reed warbler, Acrocephalus arundinaceus
- Clamorous reed warbler, Acrocephalus stentoreus

== Grassbirds and allies ==
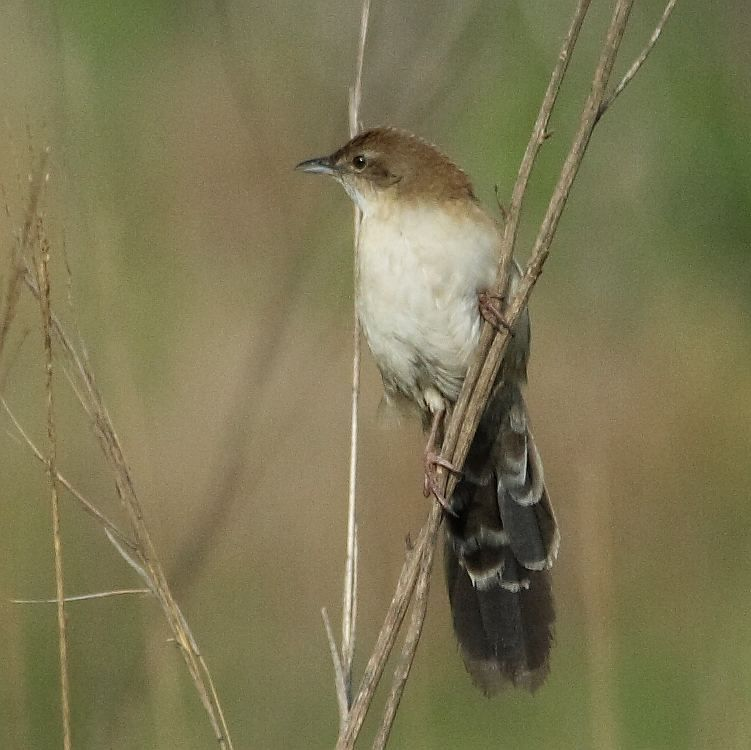
The fan-tailed grassbird occurs in the moist uplands of central and eastern Africa.

Order: Passeriformes Family: Locustellidae

Locustellidae are a family of small insectivorous songbirds found mainly in Eurasia, Africa, and the Australian region. They are smallish birds with tails that are usually long and pointed, and tend to be drab brownish or buffy all over.

- Pallas's grasshopper warbler, Locustella certhiola (V)
- Bamboo warbler, Bradypterus alfredi (E)
- River warbler, Locustella fluviatilis
- Savi's warbler, Locustella luscinioides
- Common grasshopper warbler, Locustella naevia
- Fan-tailed grassbird, Schoenicola brevirostris (E)
- Knysna warbler, Bradypterus sylvaticus (E)
- Bangwa warbler, Bradypterus bangwaensis (E)
- Barratt's warbler, Bradypterus barratti (E)
- Evergreen-forest warbler, Bradypterus lopezi (E)
- Cinnamon bracken warbler, Bradypterus cinnamomeus (E)
- Dja River swamp warbler, Bradypterus grandis (E)
- Little rush warbler, Bradypterus baboecala (E)
- White-winged swamp warbler, Bradypterus carpalis (E)
- Grauer's swamp warbler, Bradypterus graueri (E)
- Highland rush warbler, Bradypterus centralis (E)

== Malagasy warblers ==
Order: Passeriformes Family: Bernieridae

The Malagasy warblers are a newly validated family of songbirds. They were formally named Bernieridae in 2010. The family currently consists of eleven species (in eight genera) of small forest birds. These birds are all endemic to Madagascar.

- White-throated oxylabes, Oxylabes madagascariensis
- Long-billed bernieria, Bernieria madagascariensis
- Cryptic warbler, Cryptosylvicola randriansoloi
- Wedge-tailed jery, Hartertula flavoviridis
- Thamnornis, Thamnornis chloropetoides
- Yellow-browed oxylabes, Crossleyia xanthophrys
- Spectacled tetraka, Xanthomixis zosterops
- Appert's tetraka, Xanthomixis apperti
- Dusky tetraka, Xanthomixis tenebrosus
- Grey-crowned tetraka, Xanthomixis cinereiceps
- Rand's warbler, Randia pseudozosterops

== Swallows ==
Order: Passeriformes Family: Hirundinidae

The family Hirundinidae is adapted to aerial feeding. They have a slender streamlined body, long pointed wings and a short bill with a wide gape. The feet are adapted to perching rather than walking, and the front toes are partially joined at the base.

- African river martin, Pseudochelidon eurystomina (E)
- Plain martin, Riparia paludicola
- Congo martin, Riparia congica (E)
- Sand martin, Riparia riparia
- Pale martin, Riparia diluta (V)
- Banded martin, Riparia cincta
- Mascarene martin, Phedina borbonica
- Brazza's martin, Phedinopsis brazzae (E)
- Eurasian crag martin, Ptyonoprogne rupestris
- Rock martin, Ptyonoprogne fuligula
- Barn swallow, Hirundo rustica
- Red-chested swallow, Hirundo lucida (E)
- Ethiopian swallow, Hirundo aethiopica
- Angola swallow, Hirundo angolensis (E)
- White-throated blue swallow, Hirundo nigrita (E)
- White-throated swallow, Hirundo albigularis (E)
- Wire-tailed swallow, Hirundo smithii
- Pied-winged swallow, Hirundo leucosoma (E)
- White-tailed swallow, Hirundo megaensis (E-Ethiopia)
- Pearl-breasted swallow, Hirundo dimidiata (E)
- Montane blue swallow, Hirundo atrocaerulea (E)
- Black-and-rufous swallow, Hirundo nigrorufa (E)
- Greater striped swallow, Cecropis cucullata (E)
- Red-rumped swallow, Cecropis daurica
- Lesser striped swallow, Cecropis abyssinica
- Rufous-chested swallow, Cecropis semirufa (E)
- Mosque swallow, Cecropis senegalensis (E)
- Red-throated swallow, Petrochelidon rufigula (E)
- Preuss's swallow, Hirundo preussi (E)
- Red Sea swallow, Petrochelidon perdita (E-Sudan)
- South African swallow, Petrochelidon spilodera (E)
- Streak-throated swallow, Petrochelidon fluvicola (V)
- Forest swallow, Atronanus fuliginosus (E)
- Common house martin, Delichon urbicum
- Square-tailed sawwing, Psalidoprocne nitens (E)
- Mountain sawwing, Psalidoprocne fuliginosa (E)
- White-headed sawwing, Psalidoprocne albiceps (E)
- Black sawwing, Psalidoprocne pristoptera (E)
- Fanti sawwing, Psalidoprocne obscura (E)
- Grey-rumped swallow, Pseudhirundo griseopyga (E)

== Bulbuls ==
Order: Passeriformes Family: Pycnonotidae

Bulbuls are medium-sized songbirds. Some are colourful with yellow, red or orange vents, cheeks, throats or supercilia, but most are drab, with uniform olive-brown to black plumage. Some species have distinct crests.

- Sombre greenbul, Andropadus importunus (E)
- Slender-billed greenbul, Stelgidillas gracilirostris (E)
- Golden greenbul, Calyptocichla serinus (E)
- Black-collared bulbul, Neolestes torquatus (E)
- Red-tailed bristlebill, Bleda syndactylus (E)
- Green-tailed bristlebill, Bleda eximius (E)
- Lesser bristlebill, Bleda notatus (E)
- Grey-headed bristlebill, Bleda canicapillus (E)
- Cameroon mountain greenbul, Arizelocichla montana (E)
- Shelley's greenbul, Arizelocichla masukuensis (E)
- Western mountain greenbul, Arizelocichla tephrolaemus (E)
- Eastern mountain greenbul, Arizelocichla nigriceps (E)
- Uluguru mountain greenbul, Arizelocichla neumanni (E-Tanzania)
- Yellow-throated mountain greenbul, Arizelocichla chlorigula (E-Tanzania)
- Black-browed mountain greenbul, Arizelocichla fusciceps (E)
- Stripe-cheeked bulbul, Arizelocichla milanjensis (E)
- Simple greenbul, Chlorocichla simplex (E)
- Yellow-necked greenbul, Chlorocichla falkensteini (E)
- Yellow-bellied greenbul, Chlorocichla flaviventris (E)
- Joyful greenbul, Chlorocichla laetissima (E)
- Prigogine's greenbul, Chlorocichla prigoginei (E-Democratic Republic of the Congo)
- Honeyguide greenbul, Baeopogon indicator (E)
- Sjöstedt's greenbul, Baeopogon clamans (E)
- Yellow-throated greenbul, Atimastillas flavicollis (E)
- Spotted greenbul, Ixonotus guttatus (E)
- Swamp greenbul, Thescelocichla leucopleura (E)
- Red-tailed greenbul, Criniger calurus (E)
- Western bearded greenbul, Criniger barbatus (E)
- Eastern bearded greenbul, Criniger chloronotus (E)
- Yellow-bearded greenbul, Criniger olivaceus (E)
- White-bearded greenbul, Criniger ndussumensis (E)
- Grey greenbul, Eurillas gracilis (E)
- Ansorge's greenbul, Eurillas ansorgei (E)
- Plain greenbul, Eurillas curvirostris (E)
- Yellow-whiskered greenbul, Eurillas latirostris (E)
- Little greenbul, Eurillas virens (E)
- Red-tailed leaflove, Phyllastrephus scandens (E)
- Terrestrial brownbul, Phyllastrephus terrestris (E)
- Northern brownbul, Phyllastrephus strepitans (E)
- Pale-olive greenbul, Phyllastrephus fulviventris (E)
- Grey-olive greenbul, Phyllastrephus cerviniventris (E)
- Baumann's greenbul, Phyllastrephus baumanni (E)
- Toro olive greenbul, Phyllastrephus hypochloris (E)
- Fischer's greenbul, Phyllastrephus fischeri (E)
- Cabanis's greenbul, Phyllastrephus cabanisi (E)
- Cameroon olive greenbul, Phyllastrephus poensis (E)
- Icterine greenbul, Phyllastrephus icterinus (E)
- Sassi's greenbul, Phyllastrephus lorenzi (E)
- Xavier's greenbul, Phyllastrephus xavieri (E)
- White-throated greenbul, Phyllastrephus albigularis (E)
- Yellow-streaked bulbul, Phyllastrephus flavostriatus (E)
- Grey-headed greenbul, Phyllastrephus poliocephalus (E)
- Tiny greenbul, Phyllastrephus debilis (E)
- Usambara greenbul, Phyllastrephus albigula (E-Tanzania)
- Common bulbul, Pycnonotus barbatus
- Black-fronted bulbul, Pycnonotus nigricans (E)
- Cape bulbul, Pycnonotus capensis (E-South Africa)
- White-spectacled bulbul, Pycnonotus xanthopygos
- Malagasy bulbul, Hypsipetes madagascariensis (E)
- Seychelles bulbul, Hypsipetes crassirostris (E-Seychelles)
- Grand Comoro bulbul, Hypsipetes parvirostris (E-Comoro Islands)
- Moheli bulbul, Pycnonotus xanthopygos (E-Comoro Islands)
- Reunion bulbul, Hypsipetes borbonicus (E-Réunion)
- Mauritius bulbul, Hypsipetes olivaceus (E-Mauritius)

== Leaf warblers ==
Order: Passeriformes Family: Phylloscopidae

Leaf warblers are a family of small insectivorous birds found mostly in Eurasia and ranging into Wallacea and Africa. The species are of various sizes, often green-plumaged above and yellow below, or more subdued with greyish-green to greyish-brown colours.

- Wood warbler, Phylloscopus sibilatrix
- Western Bonelli's warbler, Phylloscopus bonelli
- Eastern Bonelli's warbler, Phylloscopus orientalis
- Yellow-browed warbler, Phylloscopus inornatus (V)
- Hume's warbler, Phylloscopus humei (V)
- Pallas's leaf warbler, Phylloscopus proregulus (V)
- Radde's warbler, Phylloscopus schwarzi (V)
- Dusky warbler, Phylloscopus fuscatus (V)
- Willow warbler, Phylloscopus trochilus
- Mountain chiffchaff, Phylloscopus sindianus (V)
- Canary Islands chiffchaff, Phylloscopus canariensis (E)
- Common chiffchaff, Phylloscopus collybita
- Iberian chiffchaff, Phylloscopus ibericus
- Brown woodland warbler, Phylloscopus umbrovirens
- Yellow-throated woodland warbler, Phylloscopus ruficapilla (E)
- Red-faced woodland warbler, Phylloscopus laetus (E)
- Laura's woodland warbler, Phylloscopus laurae (E)
- Black-capped woodland warbler, Phylloscopus herberti (E)
- Uganda woodland warbler, Phylloscopus budongoensis (E)
- Greenish warbler, Phylloscopus trochiloides
- Arctic warbler, Phylloscopus borealis (V)

== Bush warblers and allies ==
Order: Passeriformes Family: Scotocercidae

The members of this family are found throughout Africa, Asia, and Polynesia. Their taxonomy is in flux, and some authorities place genus Erythrocerus in its own family, the "yellow flycatchers".

- Chestnut-capped flycatcher, Erythrocercus mccallii (E)
- Yellow flycatcher, Erythrocercus holochlorus (E)
- Livingstone's flycatcher, Erythrocercus livingstonei (E)
- Scrub warbler, Scotocerca inquieta
- Neumann's warbler, Urosphena neumanni (E)
- Cetti's warbler, Cettia cetti

== Long-tailed tits ==
Order: Passeriformes Family: Aegithalidae

The long-tailed tits are a family of small passerine birds with medium to long tails. They make woven bag nests in trees. Most eat a mixed diet which includes insect

- Long-tailed tit, Aegithalos caudatus (V)

== Sylviid warblers and allies ==
Order: Passeriformes Family: Sylviidae

The family Sylviidae is a group of small insectivorous passerine birds. They mainly occur as breeding species, as the common name implies, in Europe, Asia and, to a lesser extent, Africa. Most are of generally undistinguished appearance, but many have distinctive songs.

- Eurasian blackcap, Sylvia atricapilla
- Garden warbler, Sylvia borin
- Dohrn's warbler, Sylvia dohrni (E-São Tomé and Príncipe)
- Abyssinian catbird, Parophasma galinieri (E-Ethiopia)
- Bush blackcap, Sylvia nigricapillus (E)
- African hill babbler, Pseudoalcippe abyssinica (E)
- Rwenzori hill babbler, Sylvia atriceps (E)
- Barred warbler, Curruca nisoria
- Layard's warbler, Curruca layardi (E)
- Banded parisoma, Curruca boehmi (E)
- Chestnut-vented warbler, Curruca subcoerulea (E)
- Lesser whitethroat, Curruca curruca
- Brown parisoma, Curruca lugens (E)
- Arabian warbler, Curruca leucomelaena
- Western Orphean warbler, Curruca hortensis
- Eastern Orphean warbler, Curruca crassirostris
- African desert warbler, Curruca deserti (E)
- Asian desert warbler, Curruca nana
- Tristram's warbler, Curruca deserticola
- Menetries's warbler, Curruca mystacea
- Rüppell's warbler, Curruca ruppeli
- Cyprus warbler, Curruca melanothorax
- Sardinian warbler, Curruca melanocephala
- Moltoni's warbler, Curruca subalpina (V)
- Western subalpine warbler, Curruca iveriae
- Eastern subalpine warbler, Curruca cantillans
- Greater whitethroat, Curruca communis
- Spectacled warbler, Curruca conspicillata
- Marmora's warbler, Curruca sarda
- Dartford warbler, Curruca undata
- Balearic warbler, Curruca balearica

== White-eyes, yuhinas, and allies ==
Order: Passeriformes Family: Zosteropidae

The white-eyes are small and mostly undistinguished, their plumage above being generally some dull colour like greenish-olive, but some species have a white or bright yellow throat, breast or lower parts, and several have buff flanks. As their name suggests, many species have a white ring around each eye.

- Pale white-eye, Zosterops flavilateralis (E)
- Mbulu white-eye, Zosterops mbuluensis (E)
- Marianne white-eye, Zosterops semiflavus (E-Seychelles) extinct
- Comoro white-eye, Zosterops mouroniensis (E-Comoros)
- Reunion white-eye, Zosterops olivaceus (E-Réunion)
- Mauritius white-eye, Zosterops chloronothos (E-Mauritius)
- Réunion grey white-eye, Zosterops borbonicus (E-Réunion)
- Mauritius grey white-eye, Zosterops mauritianus (E-Mauritius)
- Abyssinian white-eye, Zosterops abyssinicus
- Socotra white-eye, Zosterops socotranus
- Cameroon speirops, Zosterops melanocephalus (E-Cameroon)
- Forest white-eye, Zosterops stenocricotus (E)
- Green white-eye, Zosterops stuhlmanni (E)
- Kilimanjaro white-eye, Zosterops eurycricotus (E-Tanzania)
- Bioko speirops, Zosterops brunneus (E-Equatorial Guinea)
- Heuglin's white-eye, Zosterops poliogastrus (E)
- Kikuyu white-eye, Zosterops kikuyuensis (E-Kenya)
- Principe white-eye, Zosterops ficedulinus (E-São Tomé and Príncipe)
- Annobon white-eye, Zosterops griseovirescens (E-Equatorial Guinea)
- Sao Tome white-eye, Zosterops feae (E-São Tomé and Príncipe)
- Black-capped speirops, Zosterops lugubris (E-São Tomé and Príncipe)
- Principe speirops, Zosterops leucophoeus (E-São Tomé and Príncipe)
- Taita white-eye, Zosterops silvanus (E-Kenya)
- Northern yellow white-eye, Zosterops senegalensis (E)
- Orange River white-eye, Zosterops pallidus (E)
- South Pare white-eye, Zosterops winifredae (E-Tanzania)
- Cape white-eye, Zosterops virens (E)
- Southern yellow white-eye, Zosterops anderssoni (E)
- Pemba white-eye, Zosterops vaughani (E-Tanzania)
- Seychelles white-eye, Zosterops modestus (E-Seychelles)
- Anjouan white-eye, Zosterops anjuanensis (E-Comoros)
- Moheli white-eye, Zosterops comorensis (E-Comoros)
- Malagasy white-eye, Zosterops maderaspatanus (E)
- Kirk's white-eye, Zosterops kirki (E-Comoros)
- Mayotte white-eye, Zosterops mayottensis (E-Mayotte)
- Aldabra white-eye, Zosterops aldabrensis (E-Aldabra)

== Ground babblers and allies ==
Order: Passeriformes Family: Pellorneidae

These small to medium-sized songbirds have soft fluffy plumage but are otherwise rather diverse. Members of the genus Illadopsis are found in forests, but some other genera are birds of scrublands. All of the listed species are endemic to Africa.

- Brown illadopsis, Illadopsis fulvescens
- Pale-breasted illadopsis, Illadopsis rufipennis
- Mountain illadopsis, Illadopsis pyrrhoptera
- Blackcap illadopsis, Illadopsis cleaveri
- Scaly-breasted illadopsis, Illadopsis albipectus
- Thrush babbler, Ptyrticus turdina
- Puvel's illadopsis, Illadopsis puveli
- Rufous-winged illadopsis, Illadopsis rufescens

== Laughingthrushes and allies ==
Order: Passeriformes Family: Leiothrichidae

The members of this family are diverse in size and colour, though those of genera Argya and Turdoides tend to be brown or greyish. The family is found in Africa, India, and southeast Asia.

- Red-billed leiothrix, Leiothrix lutea (I)
- Scaly chatterer, Argya aylmeri (E)
- Rufous chatterer, Argya rubiginosa (E)
- Fulvous babbler, Argya fulva (E)
- Arabian babbler, Argya squamiceps
- Capuchin babbler, Turdoides atripennis (E)
- White-throated mountain babbler, Turdoides gilberti (E)
- Chapin's mountain babbler, Turdoides chapini (E-Democratic Republic of the Congo)
- Red-collared mountain babbler, Turdoides rufocinctus (E)
- Brown babbler, Turdoides plebejus (E)
- White-rumped babbler, Turdoides leucopygia (E)
- Hinde's pied babbler, Turdoides hindei (E-Kenya)
- Scaly babbler, Turdoides squamulata (E)
- Arrow-marked babbler, Turdoides jardineii (E)
- Bare-cheeked babbler, Turdoides gymnogenys (E)
- Cretzschmar's babbler, Turdoides leucocephala (E)
- Blackcap babbler, Turdoides reinwardtii (E)
- Dusky babbler, Turdoides tenebrosa (E)
- Southern pied babbler, Turdoides bicolor (E)
- Hartlaub's babbler, Turdoides hartlaubii (E)
- Black-lored babbler, Turdoides sharpei (E)
- Black-faced babbler, Turdoides melanops (E)
- Northern pied babbler, Turdoides hypoleuca (E)

== Crests and kinglets ==
Order: Passeriformes Family: Regulidae

The crests and kinglets are a small family of birds which resemble the leaf warblers. They are very small insectivorous birds in the genus Regulus. The adults have coloured crowns, giving rise to their name.

- Goldcrest, Regulus regulus
- Common firecrest, Regulus ignicapilla

== Wallcreeper ==
Order: Passeriformes Family: Tichodromidae

The wallcreeper is a small bird related to the nuthatch family, which has stunning crimson, grey and black plumage.

- Wallcreeper, Tichodroma muraria (V)

== Nuthatches ==
Order: Passeriformes Family: Sittidae

Nuthatches are small woodland birds. They have the unusual ability to climb down trees head first, unlike other birds which can only go upwards. Nuthatches have big heads, short tails and powerful bills and feet.

- Eurasian nuthatch, Sitta europaea
- Algerian nuthatch, Sitta ledanti (E-Algeria)

== Treecreepers ==
Order: Passeriformes Family: Certhiidae

Treecreepers are small woodland birds, brown above and white below. They have thin pointed down-curved bills, which they use to extricate insects from bark. They have stiff tail feathers, like woodpeckers, which they use to support themselves on vertical trees.

- Short-toed treecreeper, Certhia brachydactyla

== Spotted creepers ==
Order: Passeriformes Family: Salpornithidae

Spotted creepers are similar to the treecreepers of Certhiidae but lack the characteristic stiffened tail feathers. They build cup nests joined together with spider webs and decorated with lichen.

- African spotted creeper, Salpornis salvadori (E)

== Wrens ==
Order: Passeriformes Family: Troglodytidae

Wrens are mainly small and inconspicuous except for their loud songs. These birds have short wings and thin down-turned bills. Several species often hold their tails upright. All are insectivorous.

- Eurasian wren, Troglodytes troglodytes

== Dippers ==
Order: Passeriformes Family: Cinclidae

Dippers are a group of perching birds whose habitat includes aquatic environments in the Americas, Europe and Asia. They are named for their bobbing or dipping movement.

- White-throated dipper, Cinclus cinclus

== Oxpeckers ==
Order: Passeriformes Family: Buphagidae

As both the English and scientific names of these birds imply, they feed on ectoparasites, primarily ticks, found on large mammals. The entire family is endemic to Africa.

- Red-billed oxpecker, Buphagus erythrorynchus
- Yellow-billed oxpecker, Buphagus africanus

== Starlings ==
Order: Passeriformes Family: Sturnidae

Starlings are small to medium-sized passerine birds. Their flight is strong and direct and they are very gregarious. Their preferred habitat is fairly open country. They eat insects and fruit. Plumage is typically dark with a metallic sheen.

- Common hill myna, Gracula religiosa (I)
- Common starling, Sturnus vulgaris
- Spotless starling, Sturnus unicolor
- Wattled starling, Creatophora cinerea (E)
- Rosy starling, Pastor roseus (V)
- Rodrigues starling, Necropsar rodericanus (E-Rodrigues) extinct
- Reunion starling, Fregilupus varius (E-Réunion) extinct
- Common myna, Acridotheres tristis (I)
- Madagascar starling, Hartlaubius auratus (E-Madagascar)
- Violet-backed starling, Cinnyricinclus leucogaster
- Slender-billed starling, Onychognathus tenuirostris (E)
- Pale-winged starling, Onychognathus nabouroup (E)
- Neumann's starling, Onychognathus neumanni (E)
- Red-winged starling, Onychognathus morio (E)
- Chestnut-winged starling, Onychognathus fulgidus (E)
- Waller's starling, Onychognathus walleri (E)
- Tristram's starling, Onychognathus tristramii
- White-billed starling, Onychognathus albirostris (E)
- Bristle-crowned starling, Onychognathus salvadorii (E)
- Somali starling, Onychognathus blythii (E)
- Babbling starling, Neocichla gutturalis (E)
- White-collared starling, Grafisia torquata (E)
- Magpie starling, Speculipastor bicolor (E)
- Sharpe's starling, Pholiaa sharpii (E)
- Abbott's starling, Poeoptera femoralis (E)
- Narrow-tailed starling, Poeoptera lugubris (E)
- Stuhlmann's starling, Poeoptera stuhlmanni (E)
- Kenrick's starling, Poeoptera kenricki (E)
- Black-bellied starling, Notopholia corusca (E)
- Purple-headed starling, Hylopsar purpureiceps (E)
- Copper-tailed starling, Hylopsar cupreocauda (E)
- Hildebrandt's starling, Lamprotornis hildebrandti (E)
- Shelley's starling, Lamprotornis shelleyi (E)
- Burchell's starling, Lamprotornis australis (E)
- Rüppell's starling, Lamprotornis purpuroptera (E)
- Long-tailed glossy starling, Lamprotornis caudatus (E)
- Meves's starling, Lamprotornis mevesii (E)
- Ashy starling, Lamprotornis unicolor (E)
- Splendid starling, Lamprotornis splendidus (E)
- Principe starling, Lamprotornis ornatus (E-São Tomé and Príncipe)
- Golden-breasted starling, Lamprotornis regius (E)
- Superb starling, Lamprotornis superbus (E)
- Chestnut-bellied starling, Lamprotornis pulcher (E)
- African pied starling, Lamprotornis bicolor (E)
- White-crowned starling, Lamprotornis albicapillus (E)
- Fischer's starling, Lamprotornis fischeri (E)
- Lesser blue-eared starling, Lamprotornis chloropterus (E)
- Sharp-tailed starling, Lamprotornis acuticaudus (E)
- Greater blue-eared starling, Lamprotornis chalybaeus (E)
- Emerald starling, Lamprotornis iris (E)
- Purple starling, Lamprotornis purpureus (E)
- Cape starling, Lamprotornis nitens (E)
- Bronze-tailed starling, Lamprotornis chalcurus (E)

== Thrushes and allies ==
Order: Passeriformes Family: Turdidae

The thrushes are a group of passerine birds that occur mainly in the Old World. They are plump, soft plumaged, small to medium-sized insectivores or sometimes omnivores, often feeding on the ground. Many have attractive songs.

- Fraser's rufous thrush, Neocossyphus fraseri (E)
- Finsch's rufous thrush, Neocossyphus finschi (E)
- Red-tailed ant thrush, Neocossyphus rufus (E)
- White-tailed ant thrush, Neocossyphus poensis (E)
- Spotted ground thrush, Geokichla guttata (E)
- Black-eared ground thrush, Geokichla cameronensis (E)
- Grey ground thrush, Geokichla princei (E)
- Crossley's ground thrush, Geokichla crossleyi (E)
- Oberländer's ground thrush, Geokichla oberlaenderi (E)
- Abyssinian ground thrush, Geokichla piaggiae (E)
- Orange ground thrush, Geokichla gurneyi
- Groundscraper thrush, Turdus litsitsirupa (E)
- Mistle thrush, Turdus viscivorus
- Song thrush, Turdus philomelos
- Abyssinian thrush, Turdus abyssinicus (E)
- Tristan thrush, Turdus eremitia (E)
- Taita thrush, Turdus helleri (E-Kenya)
- Usambara thrush, Turdus roehli (E-Tanzania)
- Redwing, Turdus iliacus
- Eurasian blackbird, Turdus merula
- Somali thrush, Turdus ludoviciae (E-Somalia)
- African bare-eyed thrush, Turdus tephronotus (E)
- Kurrichane thrush, Turdus libonyana (E)
- Comoro thrush, Turdus bewsheri (E-Comoros)
- African thrush, Turdus pelios (E)
- Olive thrush, Turdus olivaceus (E)
- Karoo thrush, Turdus smithi (E)
- Principe thrush, Turdus xanthorhynchus (E-São Tomé and Príncipe)
- Sao Tome thrush, Turdus olivaceofuscus (E-São Tomé and Príncipe)
- Eyebrowed thrush, Turdus obscurus (V)
- Fieldfare, Turdus pilaris
- Ring ouzel, Turdus torquatus
- Black-throated thrush, Turdus atrogularis (V)
- Red-throated thrush, Turdus ruficollis (V)

== Old World flycatchers ==
Order: Passeriformes Family: Muscicapidae

Old World flycatchers are a large group of small passerine birds native to the Old World. They are mainly small arboreal insectivores. The appearance of these birds is highly varied, but they mostly have weak songs and harsh calls.

- African dusky flycatcher, Muscicapa adusta (E)
- Little flycatcher, Muscicapa epulata (E)
- Yellow-footed flycatcher, Muscicapa sethsmithi (E)
- Spotted flycatcher, Muscicapa striata
- Gambaga flycatcher, Muscicapa gambagae (E)
- Swamp flycatcher, Muscicapa aquatica (E)
- Cassin's flycatcher, Muscicapa cassini (E)
- Böhm's flycatcher, Muscicapa boehmi (E)
- Ussher's flycatcher, Muscicapa ussheri (E)
- Sooty flycatcher, Muscicapa infuscata (E)
- Dusky-blue flycatcher, Muscicapa comitata (E)
- Mariqua flycatcher, Bradornis mariquensis (E)
- African grey flycatcher, Bradornis microrhynchus (E)
- Pale flycatcher, Agricola pallidus (E)
- Chat flycatcher, Agricola infuscatus (E)
- White-browed forest-flycatcher, Fraseria cinerascens (E)
- African forest-flycatcher, Fraseria ocreata (E)
- Grey-throated tit-flycatcher, Fraseria griseigularis (E)
- Grey tit-flycatcher, Fraseria plumbeus (E)
- Olivaceous flycatcher, Fraseria olivascens (E)
- Chapin's flycatcher, Fraseria lendu (E)
- Tessmann's flycatcher, Fraseria tessmanni (E)
- Ashy flycatcher, Fraseria caerulescens (E)
- Herero chat, Melaenornis herero (E)
- Silverbird, Melaenornis semipartitus (E)
- Fiscal flycatcher, Melaenornis silens (E)
- Yellow-eyed black flycatcher, Melaenornis ardesiacus (E)
- Nimba flycatcher, Melaenornis annamarulae (E)
- Northern black-flycatcher, Melaenornis edolioides (E)
- Southern black-flycatcher, Melaenornis pammelaina (E)
- White-eyed slaty-flycatcher, Melaenornis fischeri (E)
- Angola slaty-flycatcher, Melaenornis brunneus (E-Angola)
- Abyssinian slaty-flycatcher, Melaenornis chocolatinus (E)
- Grand Comoro flycatcher, Humblotia flavirostris (E-Comoros)
- White-tailed alethe, Alethe diademata (E)
- Fire-crested alethe, Alethe castanea (E)
- Karoo scrub-robin, Cercotrichas coryphaeus (E)
- Forest scrub-robin, Cercotrichas leucosticta (E)
- Brown scrub-robin, Cercotrichas signata (E)
- Bearded scrub-robin, Cercotrichas quadrivirgata (E)
- Miombo scrub-robin, Cercotrichas barbata (E)
- Black scrub-robin, Cercotrichas podobe
- Rufous-tailed scrub-robin, Cercotrichas galactotes
- Kalahari scrub-robin, Cercotrichas paena (E)
- Brown-backed scrub-robin, Cercotrichas hartlaubi (E)
- Red-backed scrub-robin, Cercotrichas leucophrys (E)
- Madagascar magpie-robin, Copsychus albospecularis (E-Madagascar)
- Seychelles magpie-robin, Copsychus sechellarum (E-Seychelles)
- White-bellied robin-chat, Cossyphicula roberti (E)
- Mountain robin-chat, Cossypha isabellae (E)
- Archer's robin-chat, Cossypha archeri (E)
- Olive-flanked robin-chat, Cossypha anomala (E)
- Cape robin-chat, Cossypha caffra (E)
- White-throated robin-chat, Cossypha humeralis (E)
- Blue-shouldered robin-chat, Cossypha cyanocampter (E)
- Grey-winged robin-chat, Cossypha polioptera (E)
- Rüppell's robin-chat, Cossypha semirufa (E)
- White-browed robin-chat, Cossypha heuglini (E)
- Red-capped robin-chat, Cossypha natalensis (E)
- Chorister robin-chat, Cossypha dichroa (E)
- White-headed robin-chat, Cossypha heinrichi (E)
- Snowy-crowned robin-chat, Cossypha niveicapilla (E)
- White-crowned robin-chat, Cossypha albicapilla (E)
- Angola cave chat, Xenocopsychus ansorgei (E-Angola)
- Collared palm thrush, Cichladusa arquata (E)
- Rufous-tailed palm thrush, Cichladusa ruficauda (E)
- Spotted morning thrush, Cichladusa guttata (E)
- European robin, Erithacus rubecula
- White-starred robin, Pogonocichla stellata (E)
- Swynnerton's robin, Swynnertonia swynnertoni (E)
- Brown-chested alethe, Chamaetylas poliocephala (E)
- Red-throated alethe, Chamaetylas poliophrys (E)
- Cholo alethe, Chamaetylas choloensis (E)
- White-chested alethe, Chamaetylas fuelleborni (E)
- Olive-backed forest robin, Stiphrornis pyrrholaemus (E)
- Orange-breasted forest robin, Stiphrornis erythrothorax (E)
- Yellow-breasted forest robin, Stiphrornis mabirae (E)
- Bocage's akalat, Sheppardia bocagei (E)
- Short-tailed akalat, Sheppardia poensis (E)
- Lowland akalat, Sheppardia cyornithopsis (E)
- Equatorial akalat, Sheppardia aequatorialis (E)
- Sharpe's akalat, Sheppardia sharpei (E)
- East coast akalat, Sheppardia gunningi (E)
- Gabela akalat, Sheppardia gabela (E-Angola)
- Usambara akalat, Sheppardia montana (E-Tanzania)
- Iringa akalat, Sheppardia lowei (E-Tanzania)
- Rubeho akalat, Sheppardia aurantiithorax (E-Tanzania)
- White-throated robin, Irania gutturalis
- Thrush nightingale, Luscinia luscinia
- Common nightingale, Luscinia megarhynchos
- Bluethroat, Luscinia svecica
- Siberian rubythroat, Calliope calliope (V)
- Red-breasted flycatcher, Ficedula parva
- Semicollared flycatcher, Ficedula semitorquata
- European pied flycatcher, Ficedula hypoleuca
- Atlas flycatcher, Ficedula speculigera (E)
- Collared flycatcher, Ficedula albicollis
- Moussier's redstart, Phoenicurus moussieri
- Common redstart, Phoenicurus phoenicurus
- White-winged redstart, Phoenicurus erythrogastrus
- Black redstart, Phoenicurus ochruros
- Little rock thrush, Monticola rufocinereus
- Short-toed rock thrush, Monticola brevipes (E)
- Sentinel rock thrush, Monticola explorator (E)
- Forest rock thrush, Monticola sharpei (E-Madagascar)
- Amber Mountain rock thrush, Monticola erythronotus (E-Madagascar)
- Littoral rock thrush, Monticola imerina (E-Madagascar)
- Rufous-tailed rock thrush, Monticola saxatilis
- Blue rock thrush, Monticola solitarius
- Miombo rock thrush, Monticola angolensis (E)
- Cape rock thrush, Monticola rupestris (E)
- Whinchat, Saxicola rubetra
- Fuerteventura stonechat, Saxicola dacotiae (E)
- European stonechat, Saxicola rubicola
- Siberian stonechat, Saxicola maurus
- African stonechat, Saxicola torquatus
- Pied bushchat, Saxicola caprata (V)
- Buff-streaked chat, Campicoloides bifasciatus (E)
- Sickle-winged chat, Emarginata sinuata (E)
- Karoo chat, Emarginata schlegelii (E)
- Tractrac chat, Emarginata tractrac (E)
- Moorland chat, Pinarochroa sordida (E)
- Mocking cliff chat, Thamnolaea cinnamomeiventris (E)
- White-winged cliff chat, Thamnolaea semirufa (E)
- Sooty chat, Myrmecocichla nigra (E)
- Northern anteater chat, Myrmecocichla aethiops (E)
- Southern anteater chat, Myrmecocichla formicivora (E)
- Congo moor chat, Myrmecocichla tholloni (E)
- Mountain wheatear, Myrmecocichla monticola (E)
- Rüppell's chat, Myrmecocichla melaena (E)
- Arnot's chat, Myrmecocichla arnotti (E)
- Northern wheatear, Oenanthe oenanthe
- Atlas wheatear, Oenanthe seebohmi (E)
- Capped wheatear, Oenanthe pileata (E)
- Rusty-breasted wheatear, Oenanthe frenata
- Isabelline wheatear, Oenanthe isabellina
- Heuglin's wheatear, Oenanthe heuglini (E)
- Hooded wheatear, Oenanthe monacha
- Desert wheatear, Oenanthe deserti
- Western black-eared wheatear, Oenanthe hispanica
- Cyprus wheatear, Oenanthe cypriaca
- Eastern black-eared wheatear, Oenanthe melanoleuca
- Pied wheatear, Oenanthe pleschanka
- White-fronted black chat, Oenanthe albifrons (E)
- Somali wheatear, Oenanthe phillipsi (E)
- Red-rumped wheatear, Oenanthe moesta
- Blackstart, Oenanthe melanura
- Familiar chat, Oenanthe familiaris (E)
- Sombre rock chat, Oenanthe dubia (E)
- Brown-tailed chat, Oenanthe scotocerca (E)
- Black wheatear, Oenanthe leucura
- White-crowned wheatear, Oenanthe leucopyga
- Abyssinian wheatear, Oenanthe lugubris (E)
- Finsch's wheatear, Oenanthe finschii
- Mourning wheatear, Oenanthe lugens
- Kurdish wheatear, Oenanthe xanthoprymna
- Persian wheatear, Oenanthe chrysopygia
- Boulder chat, Oenanthe plumosus (E)

== Waxwings ==
Order: Passeriformes Family: Bombycillidae

The waxwings are a group of passerine birds with soft silky plumage and unique red tips to some of the wing feathers. In the Bohemian and cedar waxwings, these tips look like sealing wax and give the group its name. These are arboreal birds of northern forests. They live on insects in summer and berries in winter.

- Bohemian waxwing, Bombycilla garrulus (V)

== Hypocolius ==
Order: Passeriformes Family: Hypocoliidae

The hypocolius is a small Middle Eastern bird with the shape and soft plumage of a waxwing. They are mainly a uniform grey colour except the males have a black triangular mask around their eyes.

- Hypocolius, Hypocolius ampelinus (V)

== Sugarbirds ==
Order: Passeriformes Family: Promeropidae

The two species in this family are restricted to southern Africa. They have brownish plumage, a long downcurved bill, and long tail feathers.

- Gurney's sugarbird, Promerops gurneyi
- Cape sugarbird, Promerops cafer (E-South Africa)

== Dapple-throat and allies ==
Order: Passeriformes Family: Modulatricidae

These species, all of different genera, were formerly placed in family Promeropidae, the sugarbirds, but were accorded their own family in 2017. The entire family is endemic to Africa.

- Spot-throat, Modulatrix stictigula
- Dapple-throat, Arcanator orostruthus
- Grey-chested babbler, Kakamega poliothorax

== Sunbirds ==
Order: Passeriformes Family: Nectariniidae

Sunbirds are very small passerine birds which feed largely on nectar, although they will also take insects, especially when feeding young. Flight is fast and direct on their short wings. Most species can take nectar by hovering like a hummingbird, but usually perch to feed.

- Fraser's sunbird, Deleornis fraseri (E)
- Grey-headed sunbird, Deleornis axillaris (E)
- Plain-backed sunbird, Anthreptes reichenowi (E)
- Anchieta's sunbird, Anthreptes anchietae (E)
- Mouse-brown sunbird, Anthreptes gabonicus (E)
- Western violet-backed sunbird, Anthreptes longuemarei (E)
- Eastern violet-backed sunbird, Anthreptes orientalis (E)
- Uluguru violet-backed sunbird, Anthreptes neglectus (E)
- Violet-tailed sunbird, Anthreptes aurantius (E)
- Little green sunbird, Anthreptes seimundi (E)
- Green sunbird, Anthreptes rectirostris (E)
- Banded sunbird, Anthreptes rubritorques (E-Tanzania)
- Collared sunbird, Hedydipna collaris (E)
- Pygmy sunbird, Hedydipna platura (E)
- Nile Valley sunbird, Hedydipna metallica
- Amani sunbird, Hedydipna pallidigaster (E)
- Reichenbach's sunbird, Anabathmis reichenbachii (E)
- Principe sunbird, Anabathmis hartlaubii (E-São Tomé and Príncipe)
- Newton's sunbird, Anabathmis newtonii (E-São Tomé and Príncipe)
- Sao Tome sunbird, Dreptes thomensis (E-São Tomé and Príncipe)
- Orange-breasted sunbird, Anthobaphes violacea (E-South Africa)
- Green-headed sunbird, Cyanomitra verticalis (E)
- Bannerman's sunbird, Cyanomitra bannermani (E)
- Blue-throated brown sunbird, Cyanomitra cyanolaema (E)
- Cameroon sunbird, Cyanomitra oritis (E)
- Blue-headed sunbird, Cyanomitra alinae (E)
- Olive sunbird, Cyanomitra olivacea (E)
- Mouse-coloured sunbird, Cyanomitra veroxii (E)
- Buff-throated sunbird, Chalcomitra adelberti (E)
- Carmelite sunbird, Chalcomitra fuliginosa (E)
- Green-throated sunbird, Chalcomitra rubescens (E)
- Amethyst sunbird, Chalcomitra amethystina (E)
- Scarlet-chested sunbird, Chalcomitra senegalensis (E)
- Hunter's sunbird, Chalcomitra hunteri (E)
- Bocage's sunbird, Nectarinia bocagii (E)
- Purple-breasted sunbird, Nectarinia purpureiventris (E)
- Tacazze sunbird, Nectarinia tacazze (E)
- Bronze sunbird, Nectarinia kilimensis (E)
- Malachite sunbird, Nectarinia famosa (E)
- Red-tufted sunbird, Nectarinia johnstoni (E)
- Golden-winged sunbird, Drepanorhynchus reichenowi (E)
- Olive-bellied sunbird, Cinnyris chloropygius (E)
- Tiny sunbird, Cinnyris minullus (E)
- Western miombo sunbird, Cinnyris gertrudis (E)
- Eastern miombo sunbird, Cinnyris manoensis (E)
- Southern double-collared sunbird, Cinnyris chalybeus (E)
- Neergaard's sunbird, Cinnyris neergaardi (E)
- Stuhlmann's sunbird, Cinnyris stuhlmanni (E)
- Prigogine's sunbird, Cinnyris prigoginei (E)
- Montane double-collared sunbird, Cinnyris ludovicensis (E)
- Northern double-collared sunbird, Cinnyris reichenowi (E)
- Greater double-collared sunbird, Cinnyris afer (E)
- Regal sunbird, Cinnyris regius (E)
- Rockefeller's sunbird, Cinnyris rockefelleri (E-Democratic Republic of the Congo)
- Eastern double-collared sunbird, Cinnyris mediocris (E)
- Usambara double-collared sunbird, Cinnyris usambaricus (E)
- Forest double-collared sunbird, Cinnyris fuelleborni (E)
- Moreau's sunbird, Cinnyris moreaui (E-Tanzania)
- Loveridge's sunbird, Cinnyris loveridgei (E-Tanzania)
- Beautiful sunbird, Cinnyris pulchellus (E)
- Mariqua sunbird, Cinnyris mariquensis (E)
- Shelley's sunbird, Cinnyris shelleyi (E)
- Congo sunbird, Cinnyris congensis (E)
- Red-chested sunbird, Cinnyris erythrocercus (E)
- Black-bellied sunbird, Cinnyris nectarinioides (E)
- Purple-banded sunbird, Cinnyris bifasciatus (E)
- Tsavo sunbird, Cinnyris tsavoensis (E)
- Violet-breasted sunbird, Cinnyris chalcomelas (E)
- Pemba sunbird, Cinnyris pembae (E-Tanzania)
- Orange-tufted sunbird, Cinnyris bouvieri (E)
- Palestine sunbird, Cinnyris osea
- Shining sunbird, Cinnyris habessinicus
- Splendid sunbird, Cinnyris coccinigastrus (E)
- Johanna's sunbird, Cinnyris johannae (E)
- Superb sunbird, Cinnyris superbus (E)
- Rufous-winged sunbird, Cinnyris rufipennis (E-Tanzania)
- Oustalet's sunbird, Cinnyris oustaleti (E)
- White-breasted sunbird, Cinnyris talatala (E)
- Variable sunbird, Cinnyris venustus (E)
- Dusky sunbird, Cinnyris fuscus (E)
- Ursula's sunbird, Cinnyris ursulae (E)
- Bates's sunbird, Cinnyris batesi (E)
- Copper sunbird, Cinnyris cupreus (E)
- Souimanga sunbird, Cinnyris cupreus (E)
- Malagasy sunbird, Cinnyris cupreus (E)
- Seychelles sunbird, Cinnyris dussumieri (E-Seychelles)
- Humblot's sunbird, Cinnyris humbloti (E-Comoros)
- Anjouan sunbird, Cinnyris comorensis (E-Comoros)
- Mayotte sunbird, Cinnyris coquerellii (E)

== Weavers and allies ==
Order: Passeriformes Family: Ploceidae

The weavers are small passerine birds related to the finches. They are seed-eating birds with rounded conical bills. The males of many species are brightly coloured, usually in red or yellow and black, some species show variation in colour only in the breeding season.

- White-billed buffalo weaver, Bubalornis albirostris (E)
- Red-billed buffalo weaver, Bubalornis niger (E)
- White-headed buffalo weaver, Dinemellia dinemelli (E)
- Speckle-fronted weaver, Sporopipes frontalis (E)
- Scaly weaver, Sporopipes squamifrons (E)
- White-browed sparrow-weaver, Plocepasser mahali (E)
- Chestnut-crowned sparrow-weaver, Plocepasser superciliosus (E)
- Chestnut-backed sparrow-weaver, Plocepasser rufoscapulatus (E)
- Donaldson Smith's sparrow-weaver, Plocepasser donaldsoni (E)
- Rufous-tailed weaver, Histurgops ruficauda (E-Tanzania)
- Grey-headed social weaver, Pseudonigrita arnaudi (E)
- Black-capped social weaver, Pseudonigrita cabanisi (E)
- Sociable weaver, Philetairus socius (E)
- Red-crowned malimbe, Malimbus coronatus (E)
- Black-throated malimbe, Malimbus cassini (E)
- Ballmann's malimbe, Malimbus ballmanni (E)
- Rachel's malimbe, Malimbus racheliae (E)
- Red-vented malimbe, Malimbus scutatus (E)
- Ibadan malimbe, Malimbus ibadanensis (E-Nigeria)
- Red-bellied malimbe, Malimbus erythrogaster (E)
- Blue-billed malimbe, Malimbus nitens (E)
- Crested malimbe, Malimbus malimbicus (E)
- Red-headed malimbe, Malimbus rubricollis (E)
- Red-headed weaver, Anaplectes rubriceps (E)
- Red weaver, Anaplectes jubaensis (E)
- Yellow-legged weaver, Ploceus flavipes (E-Democratic Republic of the Congo)
- Bertram's weaver, Ploceus bertrandi (E)
- Baglafecht weaver, Ploceus baglafecht (E)
- Black-chinned weaver, Ploceus nigrimentus (E)
- Bannerman's weaver, Ploceus bannermani (E)
- Bates's weaver, Ploceus batesi (E-Cameroon)
- Little weaver, Ploceus luteolus (E)
- Slender-billed weaver, Ploceus pelzelni (E)
- Loango weaver, Ploceus subpersonatus (E)
- Black-necked weaver, Ploceus nigricollis (E)
- Olive-naped weaver, Ploceus brachypterus (E)
- Spectacled weaver, Ploceus ocularis (E)
- Black-billed weaver, Ploceus melanogaster (E)
- Strange weaver, Ploceus alienus (E)
- Cape weaver, Ploceus capensis (E)
- Bocage's weaver, Ploceus temporalis (E)
- African golden weaver, Ploceus subaureus (E)
- Holub's golden weaver, Ploceus xanthops (E)
- Orange weaver, Ploceus aurantius (E)
- Golden palm weaver, Ploceus bojeri (E)
- Taveta golden weaver, Ploceus castaneiceps (E)
- Principe golden weaver, Ploceus princeps (E-São Tomé and Príncipe)
- Southern brown-throated weaver, Ploceus xanthopterus (E)
- Northern brown-throated weaver, Ploceus castanops (E)
- Ruvu weaver, Ploceus holoxanthus (E-Tanzania)
- Kilombero weaver, Ploceus burnieri (E-Tanzania)
- Northern masked weaver, Ploceus taeniopterus (E)
- Lesser masked weaver, Ploceus intermedius
- Southern masked weaver, Ploceus velatus (E)
- Vitelline masked weaver, Ploceus vitellinus (E)
- Tanganyika masked weaver, Ploceus reichardi (E)
- Katanga masked weaver, Ploceus katangae (E)
- Lake Lufira masked weaver, Ploceus ruweti (E-Democratic Republic of the Congo)
- Heuglin's masked weaver, Ploceus heuglini (E)
- Rüppell's weaver, Ploceus galbula
- Speke's weaver, Ploceus spekei (E)
- Fox's weaver, Ploceus spekeoides (E-Uganda)
- Vieillot's black weaver, Ploceus nigerrimus (E)
- Chestnut-and-black weaver, Ploceus castaneofuscus (E)
- Village weaver, Ploceus cucullatus
- Giant weaver, Ploceus grandis (E-São Tomé and Príncipe)
- Weyns's weaver, Ploceus weynsi (E)
- Clarke's weaver, Ploceus golandi (E-Kenya)
- Salvadori's weaver, Ploceus dichrocephalus (E)
- Black-headed weaver, Ploceus melanocephalus (E)
- Golden-backed weaver, Ploceus jacksoni (E)
- Chestnut weaver, Ploceus rubiginosus (E)
- Cinnamon weaver, Ploceus badius (E-Sudan)
- Golden-naped weaver, Ploceus aureonucha (E-Democratic Republic of the Congo)
- Yellow-mantled weaver, Ploceus tricolor (E)
- Maxwell's black weaver, Ploceus albinucha (E)
- Forest weaver, Ploceus bicolor (E)
- Brown-capped weaver, Ploceus insignis (E)
- Yellow-capped weaver, Ploceus dorsomaculatus (E)
- Preuss's weaver, Ploceus preussi (E)
- Olive-headed weaver, Ploceus olivaceiceps (E)
- Usambara weaver, Ploceus nicolli (E-Tanzania)
- Bar-winged weaver, Ploceus angolensis (E)
- Sao Tome weaver, Ploceus sanctithomae (E-São Tomé and Príncipe)
- Nelicourvi weaver, Ploceus nelicourvi (E-Madagascar)
- Sakalava weaver, Ploceus sakalava (E-Madagascar)
- Streaked weaver, Ploceus manyar (I)
- Compact weaver, Pachyphantes superciliosus (E)
- Cardinal quelea, Quelea cardinalis (E)
- Red-headed quelea, Quelea erythrops (E)
- Red-billed quelea, Quelea quelea (E)
- Bob-tailed weaver, Brachycope anomala (E)
- Red fody, Foudia madagascariensis (E-Madagascar)
- Aldabra fody, Foudia aldabrana (E-Aldabra)
- Red-headed fody, Foudia eminentissima (E-Comoros)
- Forest fody, Foudia omissa (E-Madagascar)
- Reunion fody, Foudia delloni (E-Réunion) extinct
- Mauritius fody, Foudia rubra (E-Mauritius)
- Seychelles fody, Foudia sechellarum (E-Seychelles)
- Rodrigues fody, Foudia flavicans (E-Rodrigues)
- Northern red bishop, Euplectes franciscanus
- Southern red bishop, Euplectes orix
- Zanzibar red bishop, Euplectes nigroventris (E)
- Black-winged bishop, Euplectes hordeaceus (E)
- Black bishop, Euplectes gierowii (E)
- Yellow-crowned bishop, Euplectes afer
- Fire-fronted bishop, Euplectes diadematus (E)
- Golden-backed bishop, Euplectes aureus (E)
- Yellow bishop, Euplectes capensis (E)
- White-winged widowbird, Euplectes albonotatus
- Yellow-mantled widowbird, Euplectes macroura (E)
- Red-collared widowbird, Euplectes ardens (E)
- Red-cowled widowbird, Euplectes laticauda (E)
- Fan-tailed widowbird, Euplectes axillaris (E)
- Marsh widowbird, Euplectes hartlaubi (E)
- Buff-shouldered widowbird, Euplectes psammocromius (E)
- Long-tailed widowbird, Euplectes progne (E)
- Jackson's widowbird, Euplectes jacksoni (E)
- Grosbeak weaver, Amblyospiza albifrons (E)

== Estrildid finches ==
Order: Passeriformes Family: Estrildidae

Estrildid finches are small passerine birds of the Old World tropics and Australasia. They are gregarious and often colonial seed eaters with short thick but pointed bills. They are all similar in structure and habits, but have wide variation in plumage colours and patterns.

- Grey-headed silverbill, Spermestes griseicapilla (E)
- Bronze mannikin, Spermestes cucullatus
- Magpie mannikin, Spermestes fringilloides (E)
- Black-and-white mannikin, Spermestes bicolor (E)
- African silverbill, Euodice cantans
- Indian silverbill, Euodice malabarica (I)
- Java sparrow, Padda oryzivora (I)
- Scaly-breasted munia, Lonchura punctulata (I)
- Shelley's oliveback, Nesocharis shelleyi (E)
- White-collared oliveback, Nesocharis ansorgei (E)
- Yellow-bellied waxbill, Coccopygia quartinia (E)
- Angola waxbill, Coccopygia bocagei (E-Angola)
- Swee waxbill, Coccopygia melanotis (E)
- Green-backed twinspot, Mandingoa nitidula (E)
- Shelley's crimsonwing, Cryptospiza shelleyi (E)
- Dusky crimsonwing, Cryptospiza jacksoni (E)
- Abyssinian crimsonwing, Cryptospiza salvadorii (E)
- Red-faced crimsonwing, Cryptospiza reichenovii (E)
- Red-fronted antpecker, Parmoptila rubrifrons (E)
- Woodhouse's antpecker, Parmoptila woodhousei (E)
- Jameson's antpecker, Parmoptila jamesoni (E)
- White-breasted nigrita, Nigrita fusconotus (E)
- Chestnut-breasted nigrita, Nigrita bicolor (E)
- Grey-headed nigrita, Nigrita canicapillus (E)
- Pale-fronted nigrita, Nigrita luteifrons (E)
- Grey-headed oliveback, Delacourella capistrata (E)
- Black-faced waxbill, Brunhilda erythronotos (E)
- Black-cheeked waxbill, Brunhilda charmosyna (E)
- Lavender waxbill, Glaucestrilda coerulescens
- Black-tailed waxbill, Glaucestrilda perreini (E)
- Cinderella waxbill, Glaucestrilda thomensis (E)
- Black-crowned waxbill, Estrilda nonnula (E)
- Black-headed waxbill, Estrilda atricapilla (E)
- Kandt's waxbill, Estrilda kandti (E)
- Orange-cheeked waxbill, Estrilda melpoda
- Anambra waxbill, Estrilda poliopareia (E-Nigeria)
- Fawn-breasted waxbill, Estrilda paludicola (E)
- Common waxbill, Estrilda astrild
- Black-lored waxbill, Estrilda nigriloris (E-Democratic Republic of the Congo)
- Black-rumped waxbill, Estrilda troglodytes
- Crimson-rumped waxbill, Estrilda rhodopyga (E)
- Quailfinch, Ortygospiza atricollis (E)
- Locustfinch, Paludipasser locustella (E)
- Cut-throat, Amadina fasciata (E)
- Red-headed finch, Amadina erythrocephala (E)
- Zebra waxbill, Amandava subflava
- Red avadavat, Amandava amandava (I)
- Purple grenadier, Granatina ianthinogaster (E)
- Violet-eared waxbill, Granatina granatinus (E)
- Southern cordonbleu, Uraeginthus angolensis (E)
- Red-cheeked cordonbleu, Uraeginthus bengalus
- Blue-capped cordonbleu, Uraeginthus cyanocephalus (E)
- Grant's bluebill, Spermophaga poliogenys (E)
- Western bluebill, Spermophaga haematina (E)
- Red-headed bluebill, Spermophaga ruficapilla (E)
- Lesser seedcracker, Pyrenestes minor (E)
- Crimson seedcracker, Pyrenestes sanguineus (E)
- Black-bellied seedcracker, Pyrenestes ostrinus (E)
- Green-winged pytilia, Pytilia melba (E)
- Orange-winged pytilia, Pytilia afra (E)
- Red-winged pytilia, Pytilia phoenicoptera (E)
- Red-billed pytilia, Pytilia lineata (E)
- Red-faced pytilia, Pytilia hypogrammica (E)
- Dybowski's twinspot, Euschistospiza dybowskii (E)
- Dusky twinspot, Euschistospiza cinereovinacea (E)
- Peters's twinspot, Hypargos niveoguttatus (E)
- Pink-throated twinspot, Hypargos margaritatus (E)
- Brown twinspot, Clytospiza monteiri (E)
- Red-billed firefinch, Lagonosticta senegala (E)
- African firefinch, Lagonosticta rubricata (E)
- Jameson's firefinch, Lagonosticta rhodopareia (E)
- Mali firefinch, Lagonosticta virata (E)
- Rock firefinch, Lagonosticta sanguinodorsalis (E)
- Reichenow's firefinch, Lagonosticta umbrinodorsalis (E)
- Black-bellied firefinch, Lagonosticta rara (E)
- Bar-breasted firefinch, Lagonosticta rufopicta (E)
- Brown firefinch, Lagonosticta nitidula (E)
- Black-faced firefinch, Lagonosticta larvata (E)

== Indigobirds ==
Order: Passeriformes Family: Viduidae

The indigobirds are finch-like species which usually have black or indigo predominating in their plumage. All are brood parasites, which lay their eggs in the nests of estrildid finches.

- Pin-tailed whydah, Vidua macroura
- Sahel paradise whydah, Vidua orientalis (E)
- Exclamatory paradise whydah, Vidua interjecta (E)
- Togo paradise whydah, Vidua togoensis (E)
- Broad-tailed paradise whydah, Vidua obtusa (E)
- Eastern paradise whydah, Vidua paradisaea
- Steel-blue whydah, Vidua hypocherina (E)
- Straw-tailed whydah, Vidua fischeri (E)
- Shaft-tailed whydah, Vidua regia (E)
- Village indigobird, Vidua chalybeata (E)
- Wilson's indigobird, Vidua wilsoni (E)
- Quailfinch indigobird, Vidua nigeriae (E)
- Jos Plateau indigobird, Vidua maryae (E)
- Jambandu indigobird, Vidua raricola (E)
- Baka indigobird, Vidua larvaticola (E)
- Cameroon indigobird, Vidua camerunensis (E)
- Variable indigobird, Vidua funerea (E)
- Purple indigobird, Vidua purpurascens (E)
- Green indigobird, Vidua codringtoni (E)
- Parasitic weaver, Anomalospiza imberbis (E)

== Accentors ==
Order: Passeriformes Family: Prunellidae

The accentors are in the only bird family, Prunellidae, which is completely endemic to the Palearctic. They are small, fairly drab species superficially similar to sparrows.

- Alpine accentor, Prunella collaris
- Dunnock, Prunella modularis (V)

== Old World sparrows ==
Order: Passeriformes Family: Passeridae

Old World sparrows are small passerine birds. In general, sparrows tend to be small, plump, brown or grey birds with short tails and short powerful beaks. Sparrows are seed eaters, but they also consume small insects.

- House sparrow, Passer domesticus
- Spanish sparrow, Passer hispaniolensis
- Somali sparrow, Passer castanopterus (E)
- Dead Sea sparrow, Passer moabiticus (V)
- Cape Verde sparrow, Passer iagoensis
- Abd al-Kuri sparrow, Passer hemileucus (E)
- Great rufous sparrow, Passer motitensis (E)
- Kenya rufous sparrow, Passer rufocinctus (E)
- Shelley's rufous sparrow, Passer shelleyi (E)
- Kordofan rufous sparrow, Passer cordofanicus (E)
- Cape sparrow, Passer melanurus (E)
- Northern grey-headed sparrow, Passer griseus (E)
- Swainson's sparrow, Passer swainsonii (E)
- Parrot-billed sparrow, Passer gongonensis (E)
- Swahili sparrow, Passer suahelicus (E)
- Southern grey-headed sparrow, Passer diffusus (E)
- Desert sparrow, Passer simplex
- Eurasian tree sparrow, Passer montanus
- Sudan golden sparrow, Passer luteus
- Arabian golden sparrow, Passer euchlorus
- Chestnut sparrow, Passer eminibey (E)
- Yellow-spotted bush sparrow, Gymnoris pyrgita (E)
- Yellow-throated sparrow, Gymnoris xanthocollis (V)
- Yellow-throated bush sparrow, Gymnoris superciliaris (E)
- Sahel bush sparrow, Gymnoris dentata
- Rock sparrow, Petronia petronia
- Pale rockfinch, Carpospiza brachydactyla
- White-winged snowfinch, Montifringilla nivalis

== Wagtails and pipits ==
Order: Passeriformes Family: Motacillidae

Motacillidae is a family of small passerine birds with medium to long tails. They include the wagtails, longclaws and pipits. They are slender, ground feeding insectivores of open country.

- Cape wagtail, Motacilla capensis (E)
- Mountain wagtail, Motacilla clara (E)
- Sao Tome short-tail, Motacilla bocagii (E-São Tomé and Príncipe)
- Madagascar wagtail, Motacilla flaviventris (E-Madagascar)
- Grey wagtail, Motacilla cinerea
- Western yellow wagtail, Motacilla flava
- Eastern yellow wagtail, Motacilla tschutschensis
- Citrine wagtail, Motacilla citreola
- African pied wagtail, Motacilla aguimp (E)
- White wagtail, Motacilla alba
- Richard's pipit, Anthus richardi
- African pipit, Anthus cinnamomeus
- Mountain pipit, Anthus hoeschi (E)
- Woodland pipit, Anthus nyassae (E)
- Long-billed pipit, Anthus similis
- Nicholson's pipit, Anthus nicholsoni (E)
- Tawny pipit, Anthus campestris
- Plain-backed pipit, Anthus leucophrys (E)
- Buffy pipit, Anthus vaalensis (E)
- Long-legged pipit, Anthus pallidiventris (E)
- Berthelot's pipit, Anthus berthelotii
- Malindi pipit, Anthus melindae (E)
- Striped pipit, Anthus lineiventris (E)
- Yellow-tufted pipit, Anthus crenatus (E)
- Meadow pipit, Anthus pratensis
- Tree pipit, Anthus trivialis
- Olive-backed pipit, Anthus hodgsoni (V)
- Red-throated pipit, Anthus cervinus
- Water pipit, Anthus spinoletta
- Rock pipit, Anthus petrosus
- American pipit, Anthus rubescens (V)
- Short-tailed pipit, Anthus brachyurus (E)
- Bush pipit, Anthus caffer (E)
- Sokoke pipit, Anthus sokokensis (E)
- Golden pipit, Tmetothylacus tenellus
- Yellow-breasted pipit, Hemimacronyx chloris (E)
- Sharpe's longclaw, Hemimacronyx sharpei (E-Kenya)
- Orange-throated longclaw, Macronyx capensis (E)
- Yellow-throated longclaw, Macronyx croceus (E)
- Fülleborn's longclaw, Macronyx fuelleborni (E)
- Abyssinian longclaw, Macronyx flavicollis (E-Ethiopia)
- Pangani longclaw, Macronyx aurantiigula (E)
- Rosy-throated longclaw, Macronyx ameliae (E)
- Grimwood's longclaw, Macronyx grimwoodi (E)

== Finches, euphonias, and allies ==
Order: Passeriformes Family: Fringillidae

Finches are seed-eating passerine birds, that are small to moderately large and have a strong beak, usually conical and in some species very large. All have twelve tail feathers and nine primaries. These birds have a bouncing flight with alternating bouts of flapping and gliding on closed wings, and most sing well.

- Common chaffinch, Fringilla coelebs (V)
- Tenerife blue chaffinch, Fringilla teydea (E)
- Gran Canaria blue chaffinch, Fringilla polatzeki (E)
- Brambling, Fringilla montifringilla
- Hawfinch, Coccothraustes coccothraustes
- Common rosefinch, Carpodacus erythrinus (V)
- Sinai rosefinch, Carpodacus synoicus
- Eurasian bullfinch, Pyrrhula pyrrhula
- Crimson-winged finch, Rhodopechys sanguineus
- Trumpeter finch, Bucanetes githagineus
- Mongolian finch, Bucanetes mongolicus
- Desert finch, Rhodospiza obsoletus (V)
- Somali grosbeak, Rhynchostruthus louisae (E-Somalia)
- European greenfinch, Chloris chloris
- Oriole finch, Linurgus olivaceus (E)
- White-rumped seedeater, Crithagra leucopygia (E)
- Yellow-fronted canary, Crithagra mozambica
- African citril, Crithagra citrinelloides (E)
- Western citril, Crithagra frontalis (E)
- Southern citril, Crithagra hyposticta (E)
- Black-faced canary, Crithagra capistrata (E)
- Papyrus canary, Crithagra koliensis (E)
- Forest canary, Crithagra scotops (E)
- Black-throated canary, Crithagra atrogularis (E)
- Reichenow's seedeater, Crithagra reichenowi (E)
- Yellow-rumped serin, Crithagra xanthopygia (E)
- Lemon-breasted seedeater, Crithagra citrinipectus (E)
- White-bellied canary, Crithagra dorsostriata (E)
- Yellow-throated serin, Crithagra flavigula (E-Ethiopia)
- Salvadori's serin, Crithagra xantholaema (E-Ethiopia)
- Northern grosbeak-canary, Crithagra donaldsoni (E)
- Southern grosbeak-canary, Crithagra buchanani (E)
- Brimstone canary, Crithagra sulphurata (E)
- Yellow canary, Crithagra flaviventris (E)
- White-throated canary, Crithagra albogularis (E)
- Streaky seedeater, Crithagra striolata (E)
- Yellow-browed seedeater, Crithagra whytii (E)
- Thick-billed seedeater, Crithagra burtoni (E)
- Tanzania seedeater, Crithagra melanochroa (E-Tanzania)
- Principe seedeater, Crithagra rufobrunnea (E-São Tomé and Príncipe)
- Sao Tome grosbeak, Crithagra concolor (E-São Tomé and Príncipe)
- Protea canary, Crithagra leucoptera (E-South Africa)
- Black-eared seedeater, Crithagra mennelli (E)
- West African seedeater, Crithagra canicapilla (E)
- Streaky-headed seedeater, Crithagra gularis (E)
- Reichard's seedeater, Crithagra reichardi (E)
- Brown-rumped seedeater, Crithagra tristriata (E)
- Ankober serin, Crithagra ankoberensis (E-Ethiopia)
- Cape siskin, Crithagra totta (E-South Africa)
- Drakensberg siskin, Crithagra symonsi (E)
- Eurasian linnet, Linaria cannabina
- Warsangli linnet, Linaria johannis (E-Somalia)
- Common redpoll, Acanthis flammea
- Lesser redpoll, Acanthis cabaret
- Red crossbill, Loxia curvirostra
- European goldfinch, Carduelis carduelis
- Citril finch, Carduelis citrinella (V)
- European serin, Serinus serinus
- Island canary, Serinus canaria (I)
- Fire-fronted serin, Serinus pusillus (V)
- Syrian serin, Serinus syriacus
- Yellow-fronted canary, Serinus flavivertex
- Cape canary, Serinus canicollis
- Ethiopian siskin, Serinus nigriceps (E-Ethiopia)
- Black-headed canary, Serinus alario (E)
- Eurasian siskin, Spinus spinus

== Longspurs and snow buntings ==
Order: Passeriformes Family: Calcariidae

The Calcariidae are a family of birds that had been traditionally grouped with the New World sparrows, but differ in a number of respects and are usually found in open grassy areas.

- Lapland longspur, Calcarius lapponicus (V)
- Snow bunting, Plectrophenax nivalis (V)

== Old World buntings ==
Order: Passeriformes Family: Emberizidae

The emberizids are a large family of passerine birds. They are seed-eating birds with distinctively shaped bills. Many emberizid species have distinctive head patterns.

- Brown-rumped bunting, Emberiza affinis (E)
- Black-headed bunting, Emberiza melanocephala
- Red-headed bunting, Emberiza bruniceps (V)
- Corn bunting, Emberiza calandra
- Rock bunting, Emberiza cia
- Cirl bunting, Emberiza cirlus
- Yellowhammer, Emberiza citrinella
- Pine bunting, Emberiza leucocephalos (V)
- Grey-necked bunting, Emberiza buchanani (V)
- Cinereous bunting, Emberiza cineracea
- Ortolan bunting, Emberiza hortulana
- Cretzschmar's bunting, Emberiza caesia
- Cabanis's bunting, Emberiza cabanisi (E)
- Golden-breasted bunting, Emberiza flaviventris (E)
- Somali bunting, Emberiza poliopleura (E)
- Cape bunting, Emberiza capensis (E)
- Vincent's bunting, Emberiza vincenti (E)
- Lark-like bunting, Emberiza impetuani (E)
- Cinnamon-breasted bunting, Emberiza tahapisi
- Gosling's bunting, Emberiza goslingi (E)
- House bunting, Emberiza sahari
- Striolated bunting, Emberiza striolata
- Reed bunting, Emberiza schoeniclus
- Yellow-breasted bunting, Emberiza aureola (V)
- Little bunting, Emberiza pusilla (V)
- Rustic bunting, Emberiza rustica (V)

== New World warblers ==
Order: Passeriformes Family: Parulidae

Parulidae are a group of small, often colourful birds restricted to the New World. Most are arboreal and insectivorous.

- Louisiana waterthrush, Parkesia motacilla (V)

== Tanagers ==
Order: Passeriformes Family: Thraupidae

This large family includes the true tanagers, as well as a number of other species often referred to simply as "finches", although they are not members of the true finch family.

- Gough Island finch, Rowettia goughensis (E-Gough Island)
- Inaccessible Island finch, Nesospiza acunhae (E-Inaccessible Island)
- Nightingale Island finch, Neospiza acunhae (E-Nightingale Islands)
- Wilkins's finch, Nesospiza wilkinsi (E)

== See also ==
- List of birds
- Lists of birds by region
