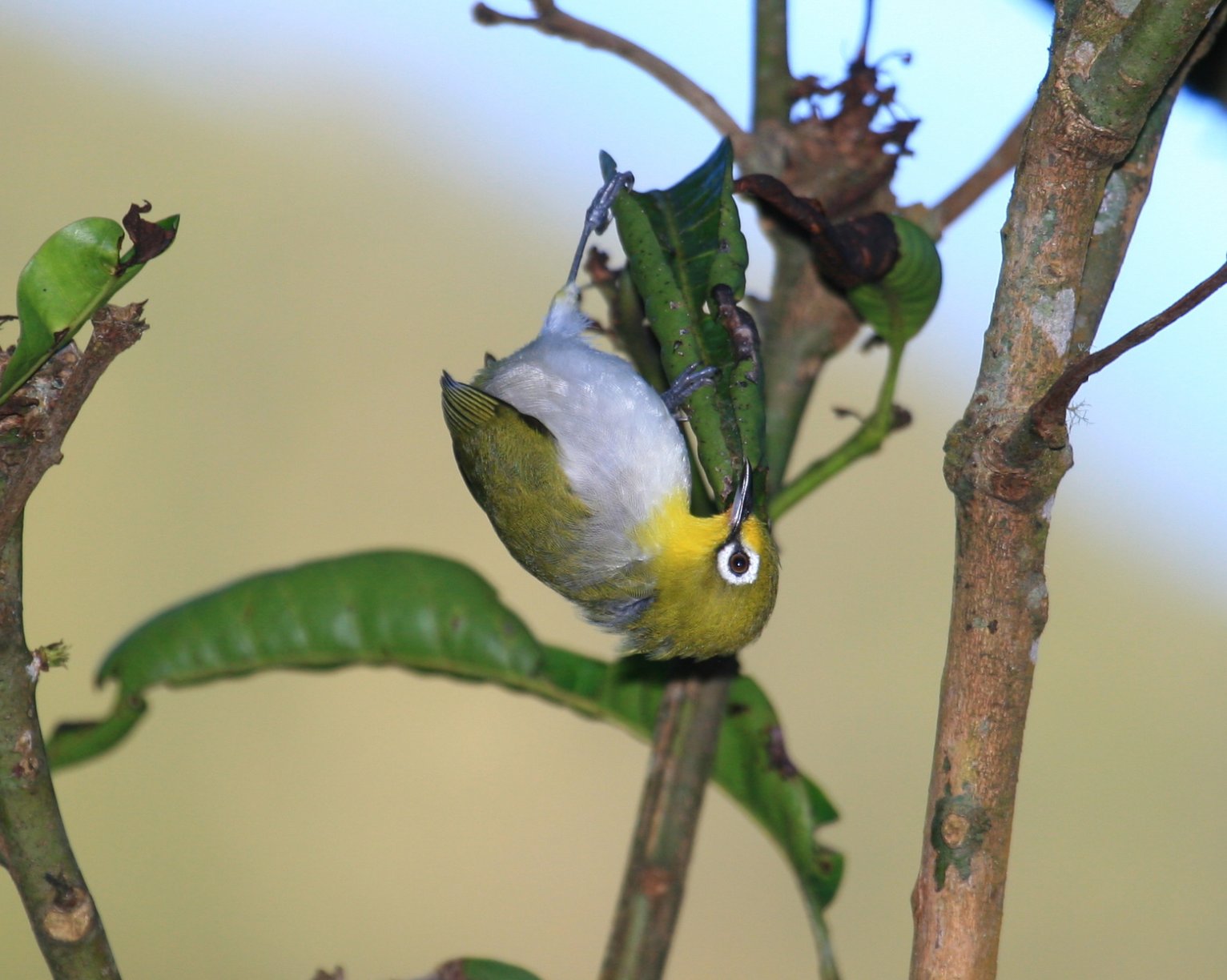

Scientific classification
- Kingdom: Animalia
- Phylum: Chordata
- Class: Aves
- Order: Passeriformes
- Family: Zosteropidae
- Genus: Zosterops
- Species: Z. anjuanensis

Binomial name
- Zosterops anjuanensis E. Newton, 1877

= Anjouan white-eye =

Species of bird

The Anjouan white-eye (Zosterops anjuanensis) is a species of bird in the family Zosteropidae.

It is endemic to Anjouan of the Comoros.

Its natural habitat is subtropical or tropical moist lowland forest.

== Population ==
There does not appear to be a population estimate on the species, but the bird is known as common. The island they live on is a factor in their species amount. With the weather and human population being the way they are, it provides an opportunity to maintain a stable number of Anjouan white-eyes.

== Description ==
The Anjouan white-eye is a small, sharp-billed warbler-like bird. It has yellow-green upper parts, yellow patches on the throat, an obvious but broken white eye-ring, with a deep yellow chin to upper breast, otherwise generally buffy underparts, and yellow vent and undertail coverts.

== Habitat & Distribution ==
Common on the island of Anjouan in the Comoros in habitats with woody vegetation, including remnant forest patches, plantations, woodland, scrub, and gardens. It is a degraded and comparatively populous island of Anjouan (or Nzwani) in the central Comoros. The bird lives in the montane forests which are very moist. They love to be in dense areas in the forest which is where they thrive best.

== Diet ==
The Anjouan white-eye feeds on berries, insects, and nectar. The bird has a wide variety of what it will consume. This animal plays a very important role in life as it is a seed moving and pollinating bird.

== Superspecies ==
It is a typical member of the Madagascar white-eye (Z. maderaspatanus) complex. The features of the Anjouan white-eye are similar to other members of the complex, namely the Aldabra white-eye (Z. aldabrensis), Moheli white-eye (Z. comorensis), Mayotte white-eye (Z. mayottensis) and Kirk's white-eye (Z. kirki), as well as with Madagascar white-eye.

== Behavior ==
The Anjouan white-eye is usually found in hyperactive flocks.

== Vocalizations ==
The bird has a very specific sound that it produces to communicate. They have a high-pitched sound that is a squeal. They also use a rattling high and low noise to add to their calls. The birds' calls are very songlike and peaceful when they produce their notes.
