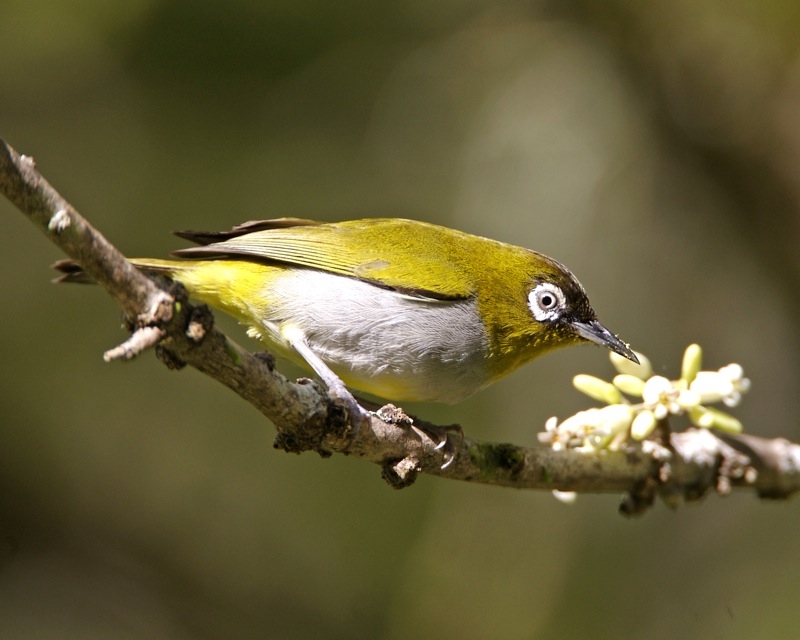

Conservation status
- Least Concern (IUCN 3.1)

Scientific classification
- Kingdom: Animalia
- Phylum: Chordata
- Class: Aves
- Order: Passeriformes
- Family: Zosteropidae
- Genus: Zosterops
- Species: Z. atricapilla

Binomial name
- Zosterops atricapilla Salvadori, 1879

Synonyms
- Zosterops atricapillus

= Black-capped white-eye =

Species of bird

The black-capped white-eye (Zosterops atricapilla) is a small passerine from the family Zosteropidae.

== Description ==
It can reach a length between nine and eleven centimetres and looks slightly similar to the Sangkar white-eye. The back is olive green and the iris is brown. The bill and the feet are coloured black. The voice is characterized by soft twitters.

== Distribution ==
It inhabits mountain forests and alpine meadows in altitudes between 700 and 3000 m on mountains of Sumatra, and Borneo (especially Mount Kinabalu, Gunung Mulu, and Mount Batu Patap).
