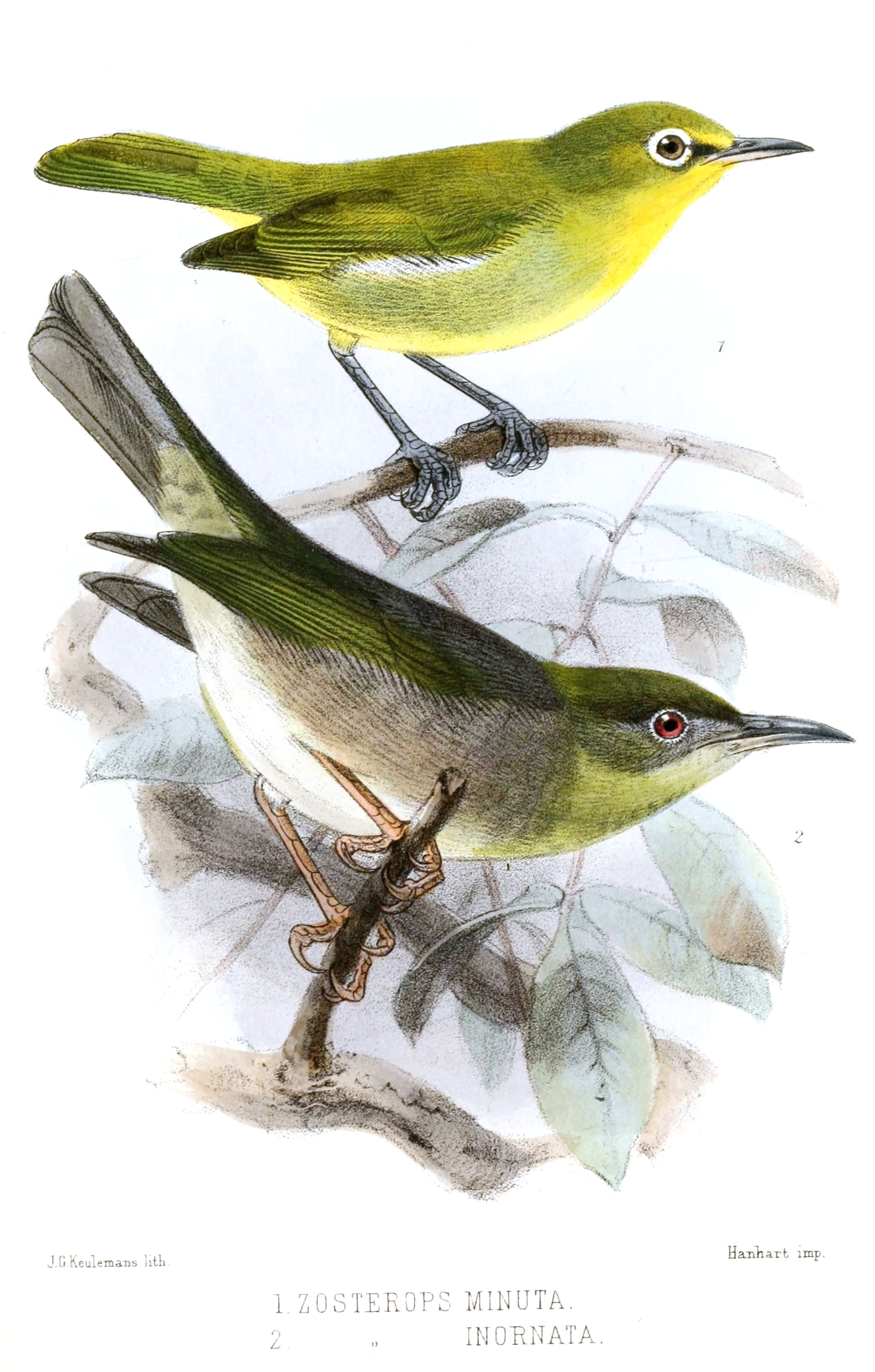
- Illustration (below) with small Lifou white-eye (above)

Conservation status
- Least Concern (IUCN 3.1)

Scientific classification
- Kingdom: Animalia
- Phylum: Chordata
- Class: Aves
- Order: Passeriformes
- Family: Zosteropidae
- Genus: Zosterops
- Species: Z. inornatus

Binomial name
- Zosterops inornatus Layard, 1878

= Large Lifou white-eye =

Species of bird

The large Lifou white-eye (Zosterops inornatus) is a species of bird in the family Zosteropidae. It is endemic to New Caledonia.
