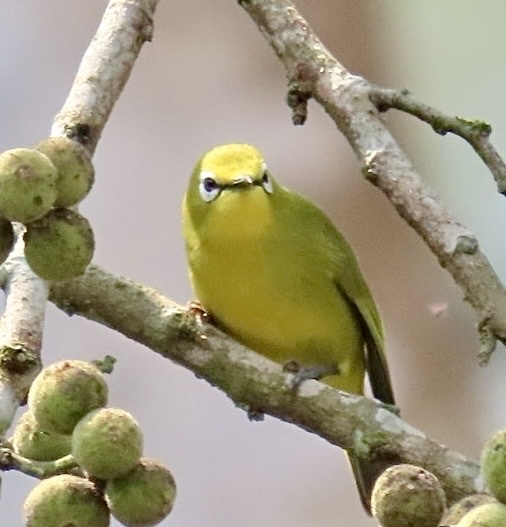

Conservation status
- Not evaluated (IUCN 3.1)

Scientific classification
- Kingdom: Animalia
- Phylum: Chordata
- Class: Aves
- Order: Passeriformes
- Family: Zosteropidae
- Genus: Zosterops
- Species: Z. kasaicus

Binomial name
- Zosterops kasaicus Chapin, 1932

= Angola white-eye =

Species of bird

The Angola white-eye (Zosterops kasaicus), is a small passerine bird in the white-eye family Zosteropidae. It is found from central Democratic Republic of the Congo to northern and central Angola. It was formerly considered to be conspecific with the northern yellow white-eye.

== Taxonomy ==
The Angola white-eye was formally described in 1932 by the American ornithologist James Chapin based on a specimen that had been collected near Luluabourg (now Kananga) in the Kasaï region of the Democratic Republic of the Congo. Chapin considered his specimen to be a subspecies of the forest white-eye (Zosterops stenocricotus) and coined the trinomial name Zosterops stenocricotus kasaicus. The Angola white-eye was formerly considered to be conspecific with the northern yellow white-eye (Zosterops senegalensis). The species were split based on the results of a molecular phylogenetic study published in 2020 that found significant genetic divergence between the two species.

Three subspecies are recognised:

- Z. k. kasaicus Chapin, 1932 – central DR Congo to northeast Angola
- Z. k. heinrichi Meise, 1958 – northwest Angola
- Z. k. quanzae Meyer de Schauensee, 1933 – central Angola
