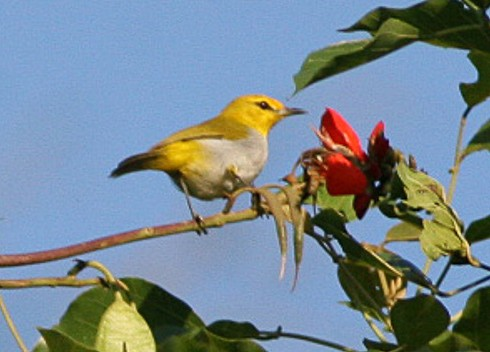

Conservation status
- Least Concern (IUCN 3.1)

Scientific classification
- Kingdom: Animalia
- Phylum: Chordata
- Class: Aves
- Order: Passeriformes
- Family: Zosteropidae
- Genus: Zosterops
- Species: Z. citrinella

Binomial name
- Zosterops citrinella Bonaparte, 1850

= Ashy-bellied white-eye =

Species of bird

The ashy-bellied white-eye (Zosterops citrinella) is a species of bird in the family Zosteropidae found in the Lesser Sunda Islands in the Indonesian Archipelago and northern Cape York Peninsula in Queensland, Australia. It is sometimes called the pale white-eye or pale-bellied white-eye, but should not be confused with the pale-bellied white-eye (Zosterops consobrinorum).

Its natural habitats are subtropical or tropical moist lowland forest and subtropical or tropical mangrove forest.
