= Annobón white-eye =

Conservation status
- Least Concern (IUCN 3.1)

Scientific classification
- Kingdom: Animalia
- Phylum: Chordata
- Class: Aves
- Order: Passeriformes
- Family: Zosteropidae
- Genus: Zosterops
- Species: Z. griseovirescens

Binomial name
- Zosterops griseovirescens Barboza du Bocage, 1893

Species of bird

The Annobón white-eye (Zosterops griseovirescens) is a species of bird in the family Zosteropidae. It is endemic to the island of Annobón, part of Equatorial Guinea. It was listed as vulnerable by the IUCN until 2021 when they updated its status to least concern.

Its natural habitats are subtropical or tropical moist lowland forests and plantations.

== Description ==
The length is up to 12 cm (4.7 in) with its wings up to 6.2 cm (2.4 in) and its tail up to 2.1 cm (0.83 in) long.

== Distribution ==
Its distribution area is 17 km^{2} (6.6 sq mi).

== Sources ==
- Otto Finsch: Das Tierreich. Lieferung 15: Zosteropidae. Friedländer, Berlin 1901.
- M. J. S. Harrison: A recent survey of the birds of Pagalu (Annobon). In: Malimbus. Ausgabe 11. April 1990, ISSN 0331-3689, S. 135–143.
