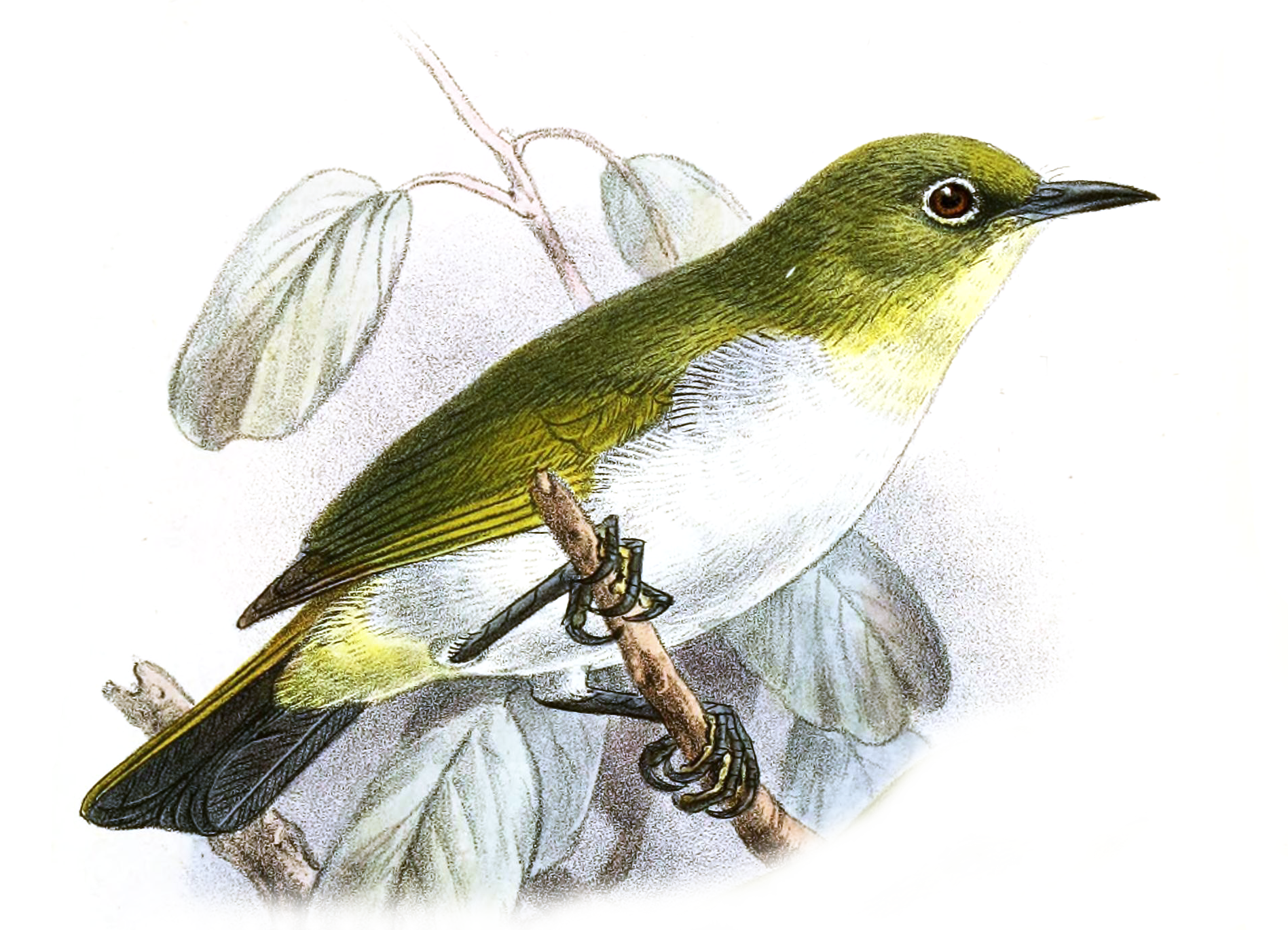

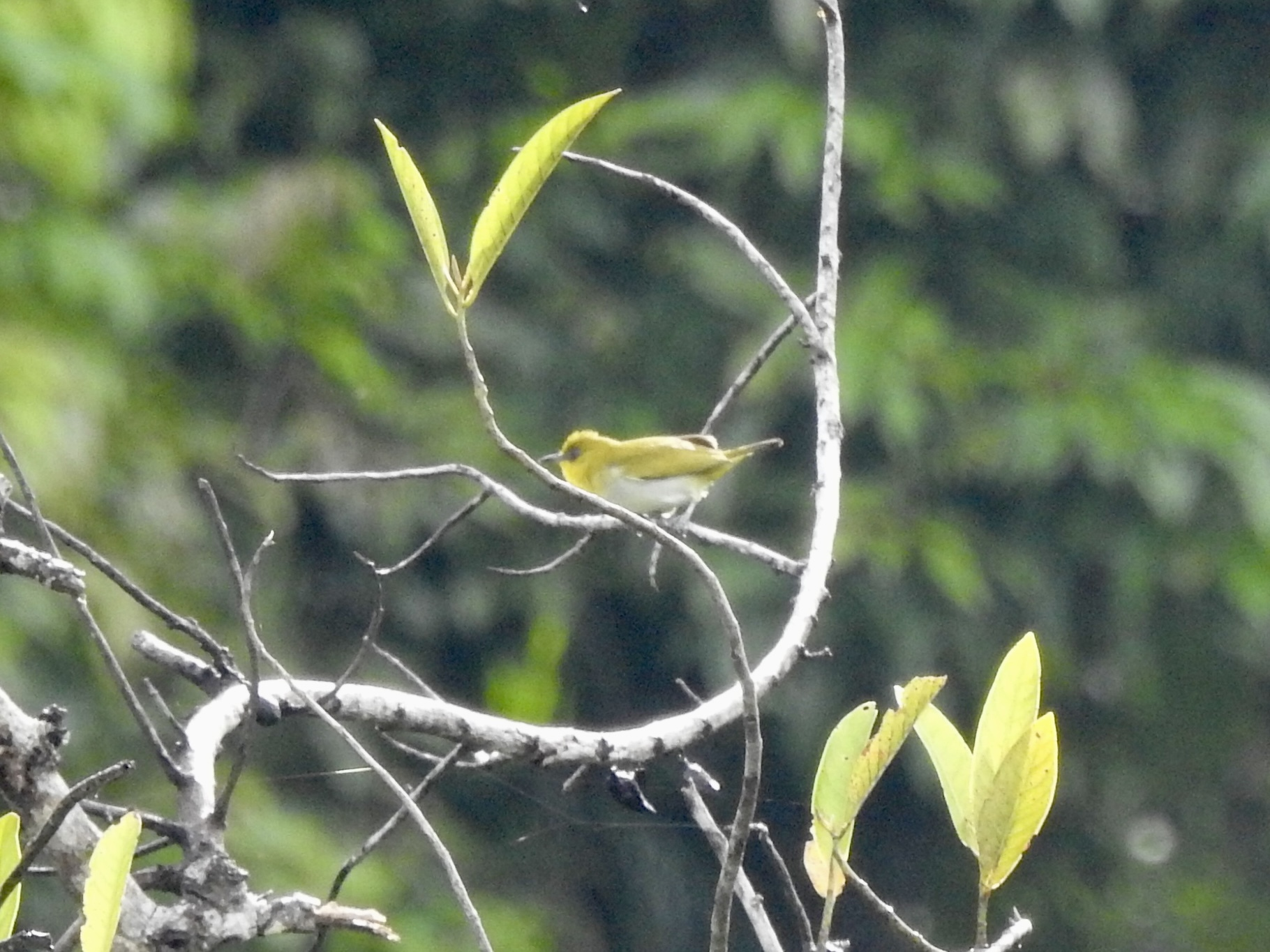

Conservation status
- Least Concern (IUCN 3.1)

Scientific classification
- Kingdom: Animalia
- Phylum: Chordata
- Class: Aves
- Order: Passeriformes
- Family: Zosteropidae
- Genus: Zosterops
- Species: Z. metcalfii

Binomial name
- Zosterops metcalfii Tristram, 1894

= Yellow-throated white-eye =

Species of bird

The yellow-throated white-eye (Zosterops metcalfii) is a species of bird in the family Zosteropidae. It is found in the Solomon Islands archipelago (Bougainville, Choiseul, Santa Isabel and Nggela Islands).
