= Bismarck white-eye =

Conservation status
- Least Concern (IUCN 3.1)

Scientific classification
- Kingdom: Animalia
- Phylum: Chordata
- Class: Aves
- Order: Passeriformes
- Family: Zosteropidae
- Genus: Zosterops
- Species: Z. hypoxanthus

Binomial name
- Zosterops hypoxanthus Salvadori, 1881

Species of bird

The Bismarck white-eye or black-headed white-eye (Zosterops hypoxanthus) is a species of bird in the family Zosteropidae. It is endemic to the Bismarck Archipelago in Papua New Guinea, where it occurs in New Britain, New Ireland and a number of smaller islands. It is sometimes considered to be the same species as the black-fronted white-eye of the mainland of New Guinea. The species is found in forests, forest edges, secondary forest, gardens and plantations, generally in hill and mountain areas and more rarely down to sea level.

The species has a black face, dark olive neck, back and wings, and olive rump with a black tail (paler in some subspecies), and bright yellow undersides. The white eye-ring is bright but incomplete, broken at the front. The plumage of the male and female are similar.
