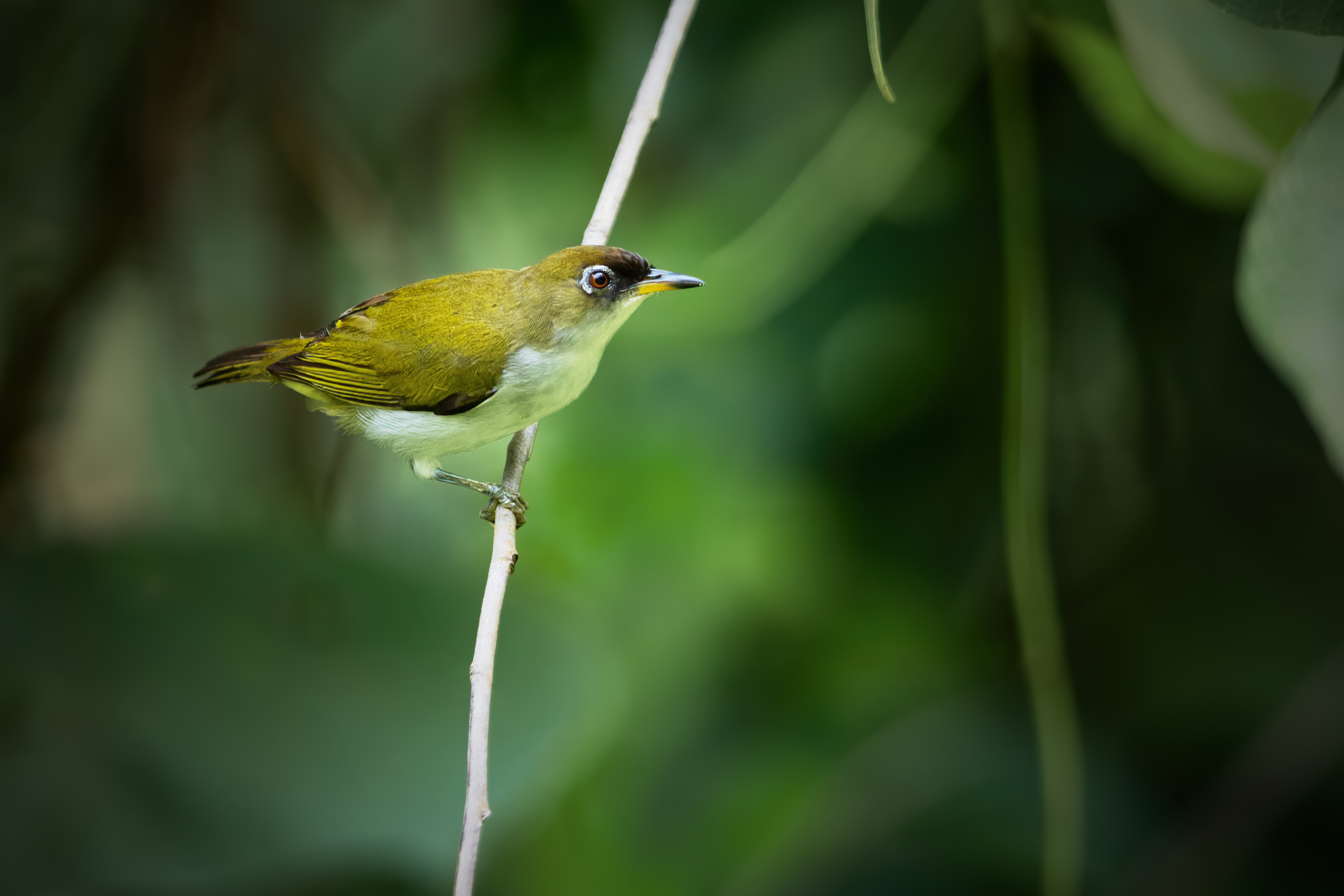

Conservation status
- Least Concern (IUCN 3.1)

Scientific classification
- Kingdom: Animalia
- Phylum: Chordata
- Class: Aves
- Order: Passeriformes
- Family: Zosteropidae
- Genus: Zosterops
- Species: Z. atriceps

Binomial name
- Zosterops atriceps GR Gray, 1861

= Cream-throated white-eye =

Species of bird

Cream-throated White-eye

The cream-throated white-eye (Zosterops atriceps) is a species of bird in the family Zosteropidae. It is endemic to the northern Moluccas.

Its natural habitats are subtropical or tropical moist lowland forest and subtropical or tropical mangrove forest. They can be found on the Maluku Utara in Indonesia.
