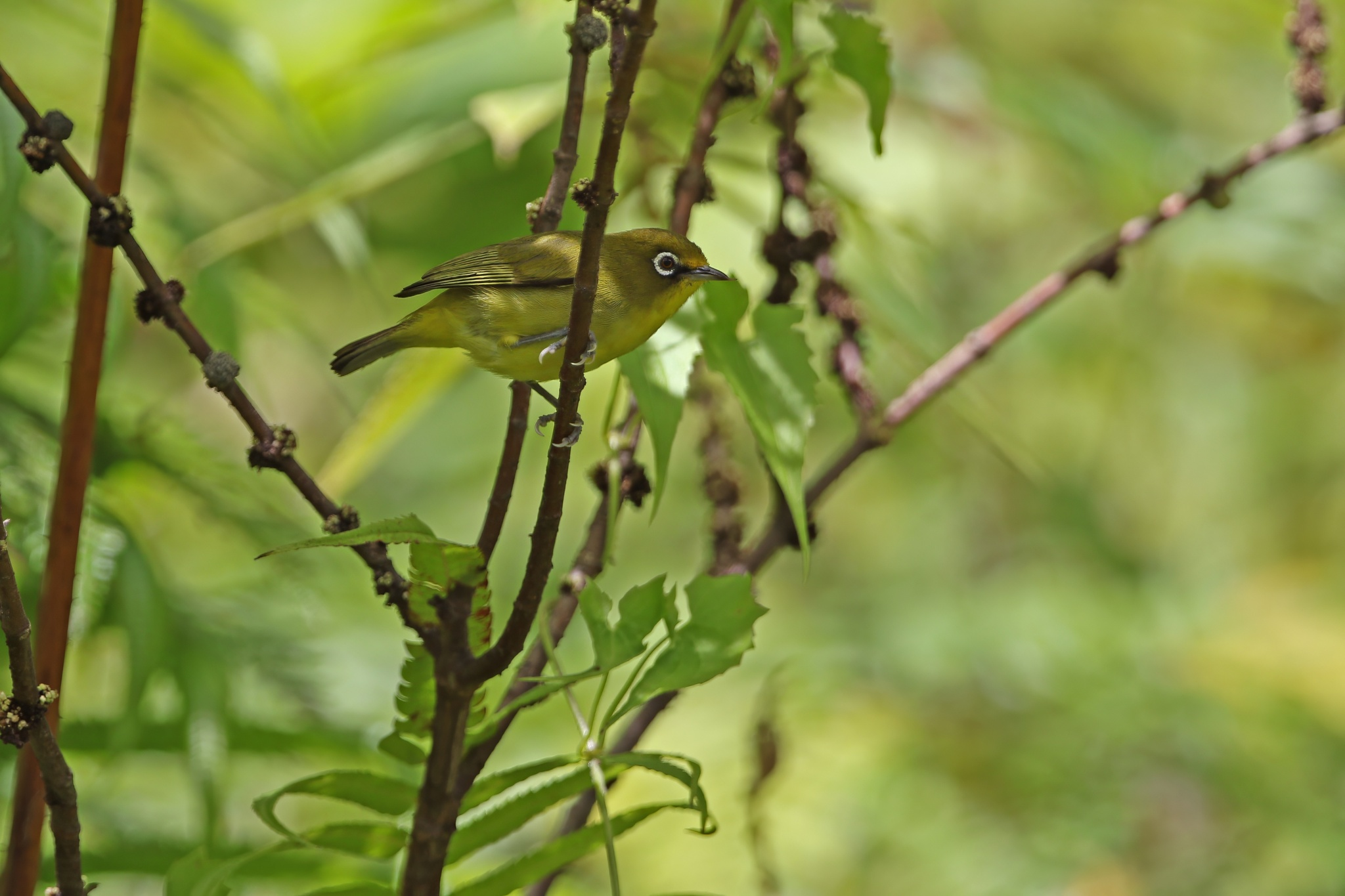

Conservation status
- Least Concern (IUCN 3.1)

Scientific classification
- Kingdom: Animalia
- Phylum: Chordata
- Class: Aves
- Order: Passeriformes
- Family: Zosteropidae
- Genus: Zosterops
- Species: Z. buruensis

Binomial name
- Zosterops buruensis Salvadori, 1878

= Buru white-eye =

Species of bird

The Buru white-eye (Zosterops buruensis) is a species of bird in the family Zosteropidae. It is endemic to Indonesian islands, including the island of Buru which gives its name. Its natural habitats are subtropical or tropical moist lowland forests and subtropical or tropical moist montane forests. The species occupy an area of larger than 20,000 km^{2} and is thought to have a stable population of above 10,000, and thus are not considered as threatened.
