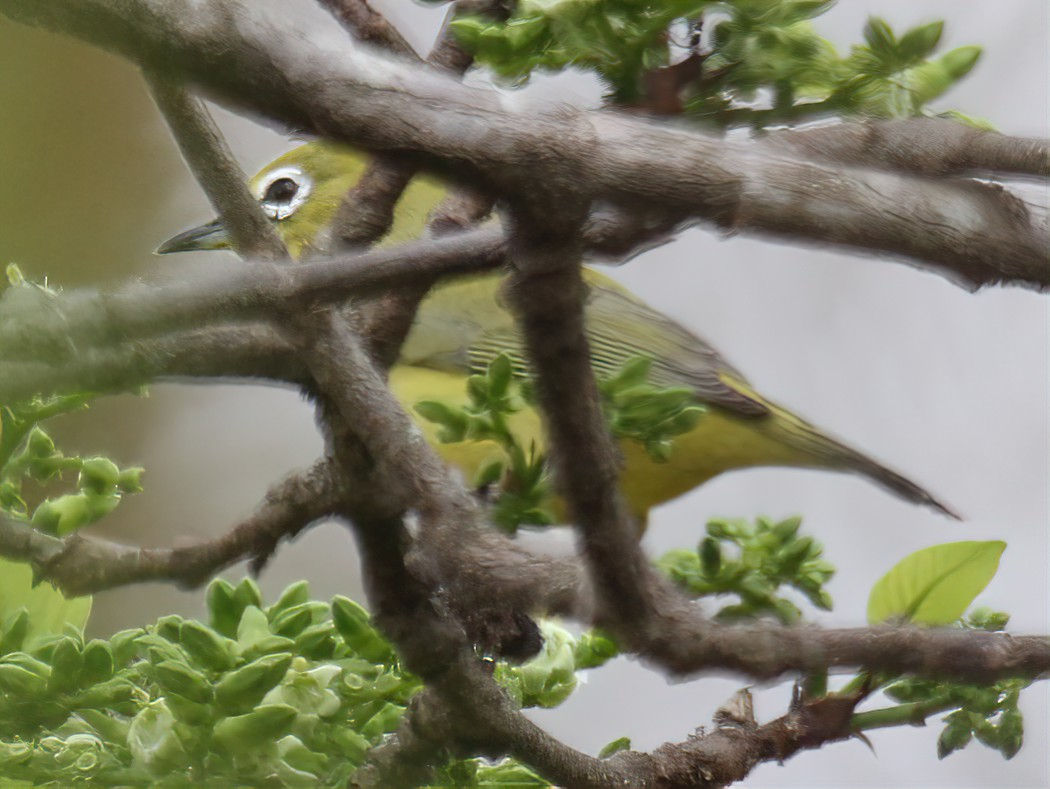
- In Nairobi National Park, Kenya

Conservation status
- Least Concern (IUCN 3.1)

Scientific classification
- Kingdom: Animalia
- Phylum: Chordata
- Class: Aves
- Order: Passeriformes
- Family: Zosteropidae
- Genus: Zosterops
- Species: Z. kikuyuensis

Binomial name
- Zosterops kikuyuensis Sharpe, 1891

Synonyms
- Zosterops poliogastrus kikuyensis

= Kikuyu white-eye =

Species of bird

The Kikuyu white-eye (Zosterops kikuyuensis) is a species of bird in the family Zosteropidae. It was formerly considered a subspecies of montane white-eye (Z. poliogastrus). It is found in central Kenya, in the Aberdare Mountains and on Mount Kenya. IUCN categorizes it as of least concern.
