= Dark-eyed white-eye =

Scientific classification
- Kingdom: Animalia
- Phylum: Chordata
- Class: Aves
- Order: Passeriformes
- Family: Zosteropidae
- Genus: Zosterops
- Species: Z. tetiparius

Binomial name
- Zosterops tetiparius Murphy, 1929

Species of bird

The dark-eyed white-eye (Zosterops tetiparius) is a species of passerine bird in the family Zosteropidae. It has two subspecies, Z. t. tetiparius and Z. t. paradoxus.

== Description ==
Like other white-eye species, Zosterops tetiparius is yellow-olive in color, with a slender bill. Z. t. tetiparius can be distinguished by its pale belly. The dark-eyed white-eye lacks the white eye ring that gives the white-eye family its name.

== Distribution and habitat ==
Zosterops tetiparius is found in subtropical or tropical moist lowland forest in the Solomon Islands.

Z. t. paradoxus is found on Rendova Island and Z. t. tetiparius on Tetepare Island. These islands lie just 3.4km apart from each other. The two subspecies have never been recorded away from their respective home islands.

Z. tetiparius is non-migratory.

== Conservation status ==
The dark-eyed white-eye is classified as Least Concern by the IUCN, although its exact population is unknown. Due to its small native range, it is thought to be at risk due to random events such as hurricanes.
