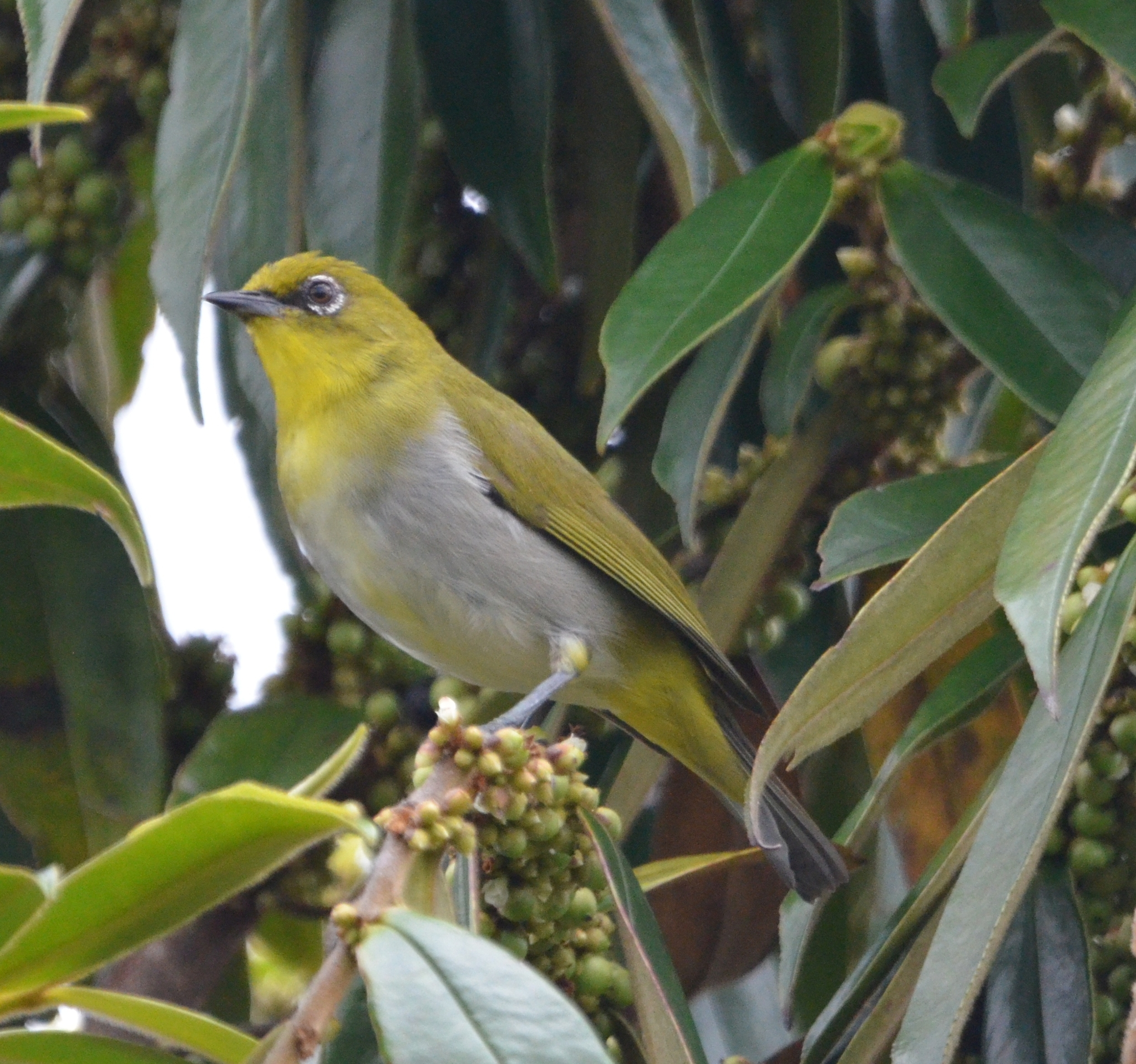

Conservation status
- Least Concern (IUCN 3.1)

Scientific classification
- Kingdom: Animalia
- Phylum: Chordata
- Class: Aves
- Order: Passeriformes
- Family: Zosteropidae
- Genus: Zosterops
- Species: Z. novaeguineae

Binomial name
- Zosterops novaeguineae Salvadori, 1878

= Papuan white-eye =

Species of bird

The Papuan white-eye (Zosterops novaeguineae), sometimes known as the New Guinea white-eye, is a species of bird in the family Zosteropidae. It is found in the Aru Islands and New Guinea (mainly Huon, Bird's Head and Papuan Peninsula). Its natural habitats are subtropical or tropical moist lowland forests and subtropical or tropical moist montane forests. The species was first classified in 1878, and has a conservation status of Least Concern.
