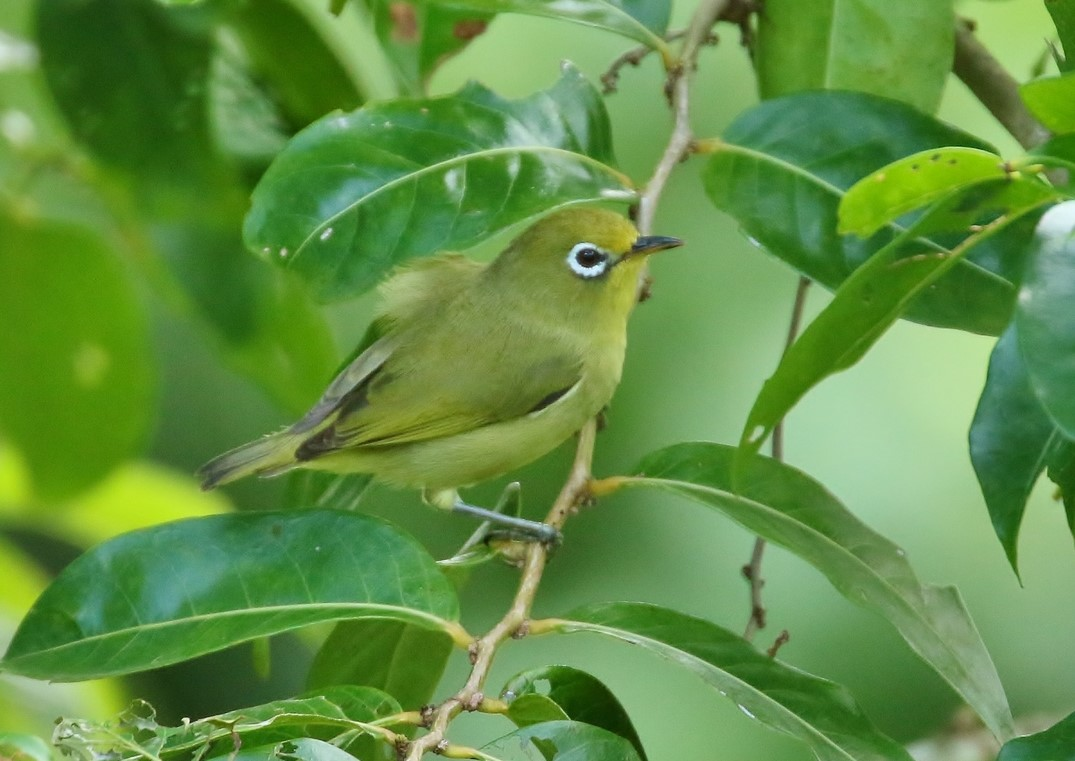
- Zosterops semperi owstoni

Conservation status
- Least Concern (IUCN 3.1)

Scientific classification
- Kingdom: Animalia
- Phylum: Chordata
- Class: Aves
- Order: Passeriformes
- Family: Zosteropidae
- Genus: Zosterops
- Species: Z. semperi

Binomial name
- Zosterops semperi Hartlaub, 1868

= Citrine white-eye =

Species of bird

The citrine white-eye (Zosterops semperi), or Caroline Islands white-eye, is a species of bird in the family Zosteropidae. It is found in Palau and the Federated States of Micronesia.
