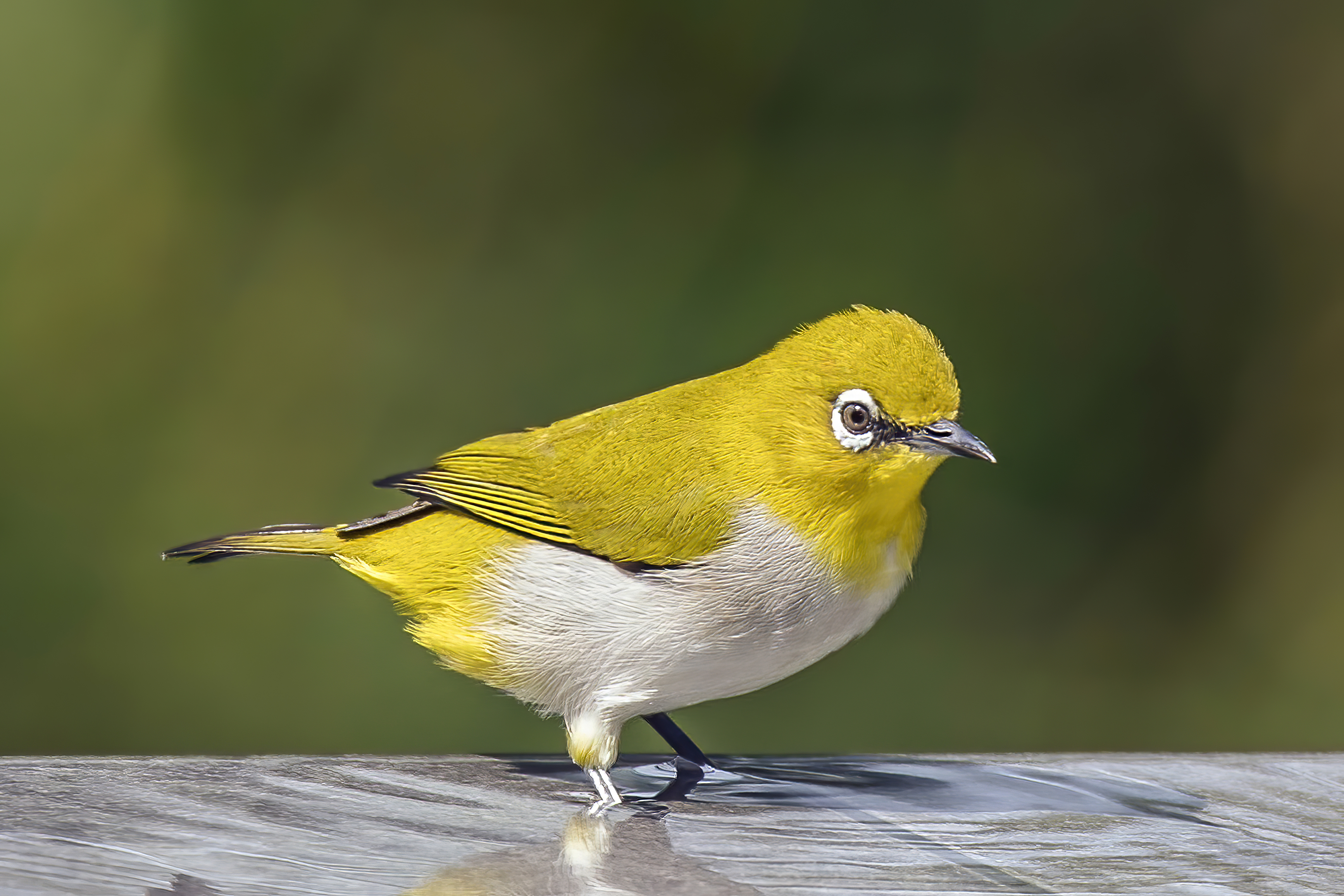
- Z. palpebrosus egregius, Sri Lanka

Scientific classification
- Kingdom: Animalia
- Phylum: Chordata
- Class: Aves
- Order: Passeriformes
- Family: Zosteropidae
- Genus: Zosterops; Vigors & Horsfield, 1827

Type species
- Motacilla maderaspatana (Malagasy white-eye) Linnaeus, 1766

Species
- See text

= Zosterops =

Genus of birds

Zosterops (meaning "eye-girdle") is a genus of passerine birds containing the typical white-eyes in the white-eye family Zosteropidae. The genus has the largest number of species in the white-eye family. They occur in the Afrotropical, Indomalayan, and Australasian realms. Typical white-eyes have a length of between 8 and 15 cm (3 and 6 in). Their most characteristic feature is a conspicuous white feather ring around the eye, though some species lack it. The species in this group vary in the structural adaptations of the tongue. The Zosterops [griseotinctus] group is an example of a "great speciator" inhabiting a vast area and showing a remarkable morphological differentiation on islands, some of which may be as close as 2 km (1.2 mi) apart.

== Systematics ==
The genus Zosterops was introduced by the naturalists Nicholas Vigors and Thomas Horsfield in 1827. The name combines the Ancient Greek words zōstēros "belt" or "girdle" and ōpos "eye". The type species was designated as the Malagasy white-eye by René Lesson in 1828.

The results of a series of molecular phylogenetic studies of the Zosteropidae published between 2014 and 2018 prompted a major revision of species limits, in which 10 new genera were introduced. In the reorganisation, the English names of three of the existing genera were replaced.

Additionally, a study on Sri Lanka white-eyes (Zosterops ceylonensis) and Indian white-eyes (Zosterops palpebrosus) suggests that the Sri Lanka white-eye is the root species and the origin of all Zosterops species. This raises questions upon the former theory of Southeast Asian origin.

=== Species ===
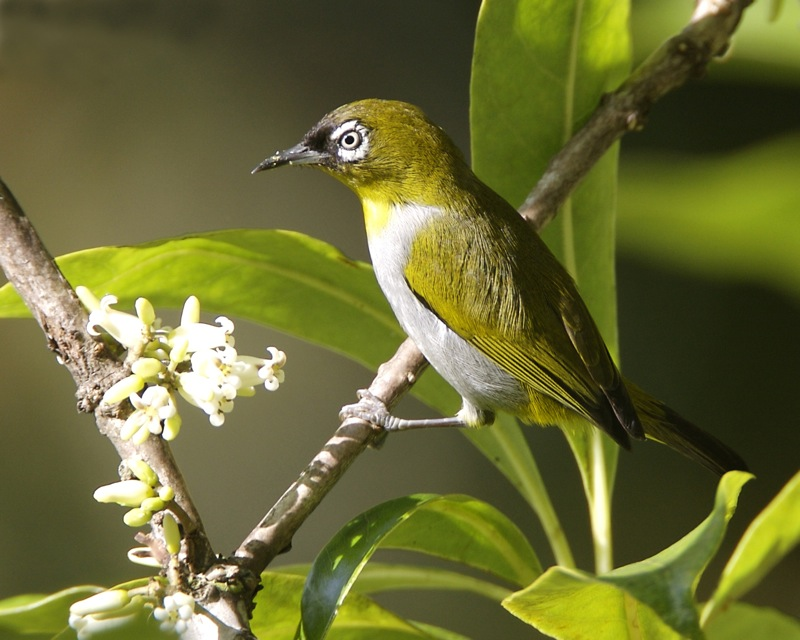
Black-capped white-eye Z. atricapilla

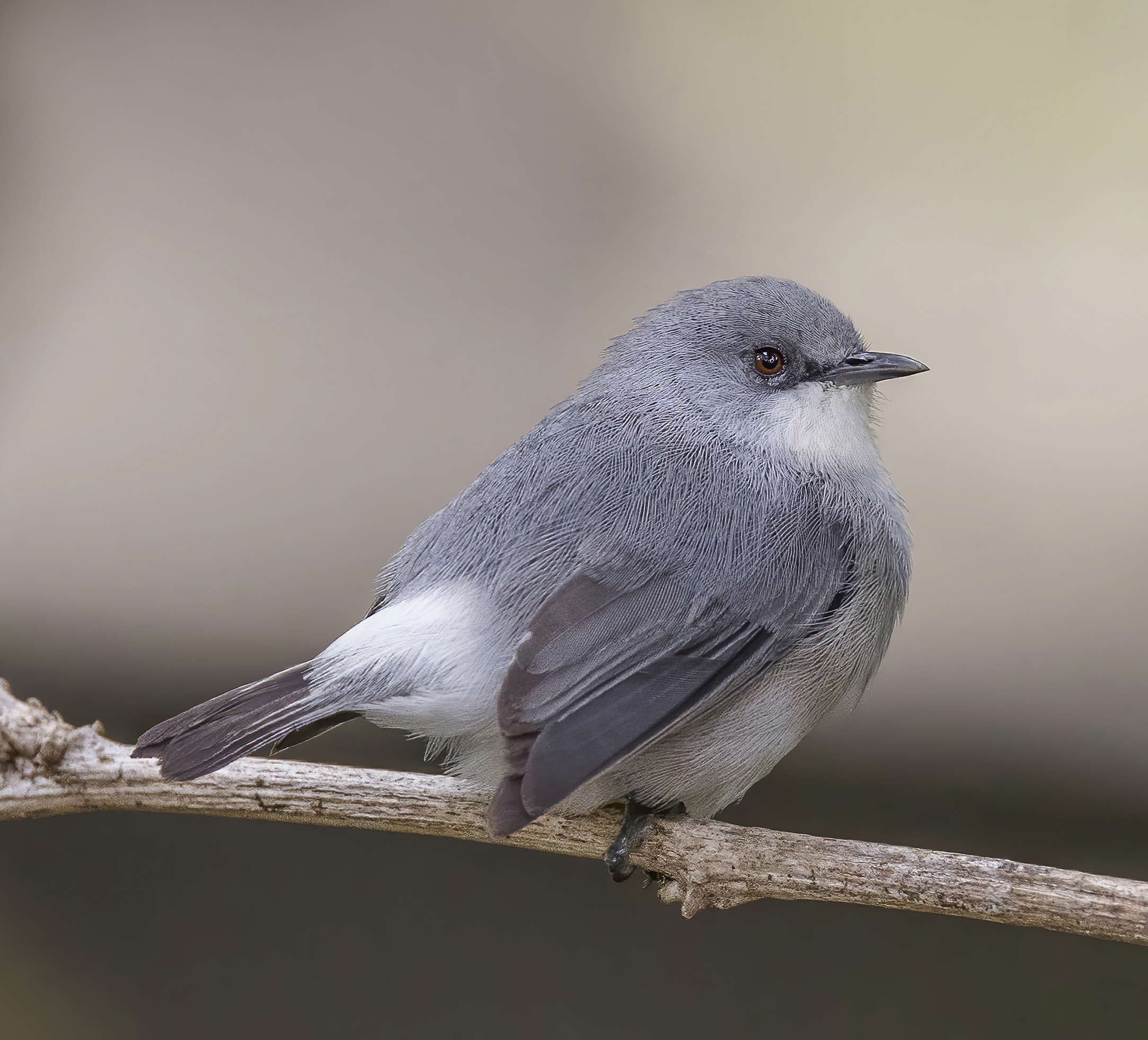
Mauritius grey white-eye Zosterops mauritianus

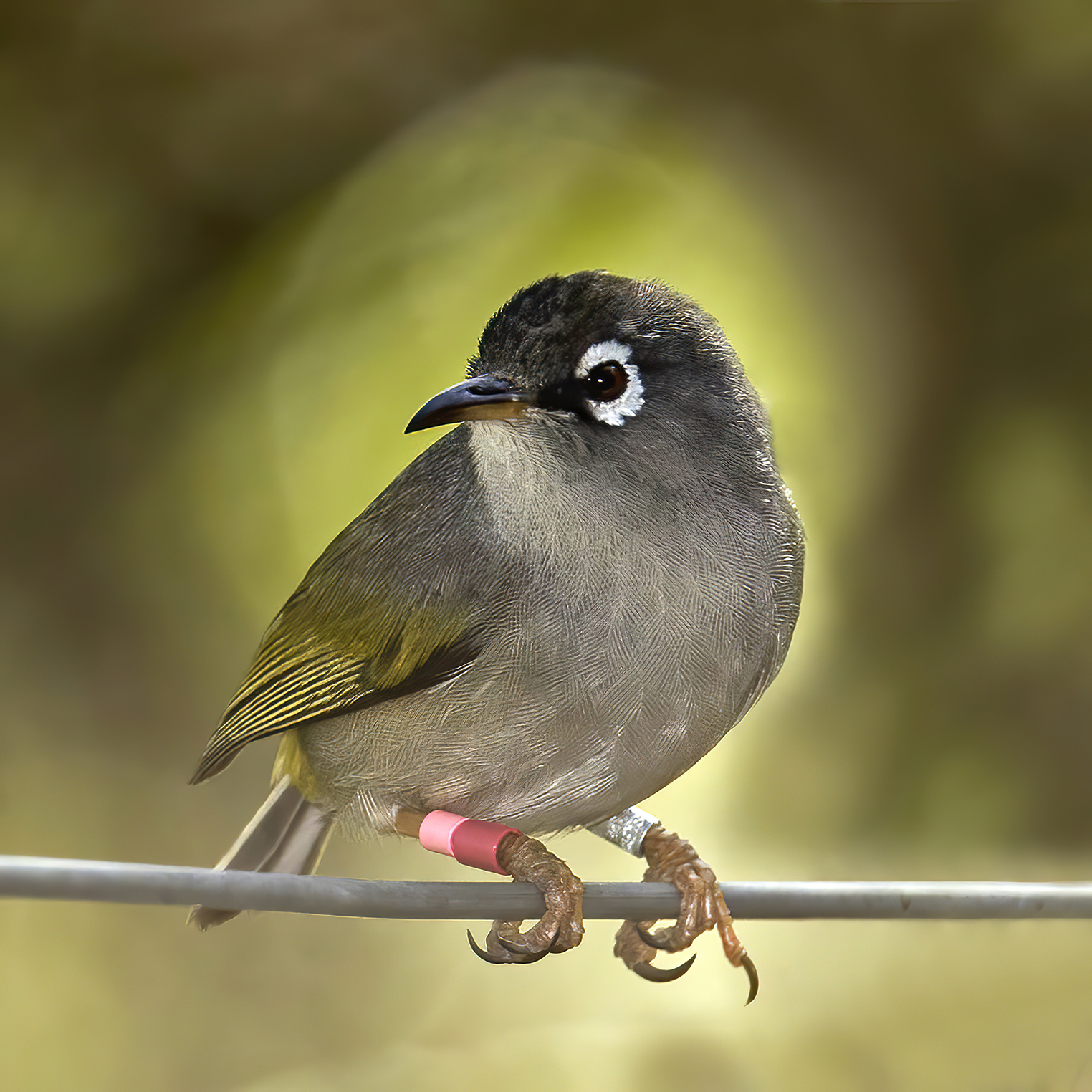
Mauritius olive white-eye Zosterops chloronothos

There are over 100 species in the genus. The genus includes three or four species (denoted by a dagger † in the list below) that have become extinct since the 16th century.

- Sri Lanka white-eye (Zosterops ceylonensis)
- Yellowish white-eye (Zosterops nigrorum)
- Black-capped white-eye (Zosterops atricapilla)
- Abyssinian white-eye (Zosterops abyssinicus)
- Pale white-eye (Zosterops flavilateralis)
- Mbulu white-eye (Zosterops mbuluensis) – split from Z. poliogastrus
- Chestnut-flanked white-eye (Zosterops erythropleurus)
- Swinhoe's white-eye (Zosterops simplex) – split from Z. japonicus
- Mountain blackeye (Zosterops emiliae)
- Warbling white-eye (Zosterops japonicus) – includes Japanese white-eye and mountain white-eye
- Indian white-eye (Zosterops palpebrosus) – formerly oriental white-eye
- Lowland white-eye (Zosterops meyeni)
- † Marianne white-eye (Zosterops semiflavus)
- Karthala white-eye (Zosterops mouroniensis)
- Réunion olive white-eye (Zosterops olivaceus)
- Mauritius olive white-eye (Zosterops chloronothos)
- Réunion grey white-eye (Zosterops borbonicus)
- Mauritius grey white-eye (Zosterops mauritianus)
- Mount Cameroon speirops (Zosterops melanocephalus)
- Forest white-eye (Zosterops stenocricotus)
- Green white-eye (Zosterops stuhlmanni) – split from Z. poliogastrus
- Broad-ringed white-eye (Zosterops eurycricotus) – split from Z. poliogastrus
- Fernando Po speirops (Zosterops brunneus)
- Ethiopian white-eye (Zosterops poliogastrus) – formerly montane white-eye and Heuglin's white-eye
- Kafa white-eye, (Zosterops kaffensis) – split from Z. poliogastrus
- Kikuyu white-eye (Zosterops kikuyuensis)
- Socotra white-eye (Zosterops socotranus) – split from Z. abyssinicus
- Príncipe white-eye (Zosterops ficedulinus)
- Annobón white-eye (Zosterops griseovirescens)
- São Tomé white-eye (Zosterops feae)
- Black-capped speirops (Zosterops lugubris)
- Príncipe speirops (Zosterops leucophaeus)
- Taita white-eye (Zosterops silvanus)
- Northern yellow white-eye (Zosterops senegalensis) – formerly African yellow white-eye
- Angola white-eye (Zosterops kasaicus) – split from Z. senegalensis
- Orange River white-eye (Zosterops pallidus)
- South Pare white-eye (Zosterops winifredae) – split from Z. poliogastrus
- Cape white-eye (Zosterops virens)
- Southern yellow white-eye (Zosterops anderssoni) – split from Z. senegalensis
- Pemba white-eye (Zosterops vaughani)
- Seychelles white-eye (Zosterops modestus)
- Anjouan white-eye (Zosterops anjuanensis)
- Moheli white-eye (Zosterops comorensis)
- Malagasy white-eye (Zosterops maderaspatanus)
- Meratus white-eye (Zosterops meratusensis)
- Aldabra white-eye (Zosterops aldabrensis) – split from Z. maderaspatanus
- Kirk's white-eye (Zosterops kirki)
- Mayotte white-eye (Zosterops mayottensis)
- Lemon-bellied white-eye (Zosterops chloris)
- Wakatobi white-eye (Zosterops flavissimus) – split from Z. chloris
- Black-crowned white-eye (Zosterops atrifrons)
- Sangihe white-eye(Zosterops nehrkorni)
- Pale-bellied white-eye (Zosterops consobrinorum)
- Togian white-eye (Zosterops somadikartai)
- Black-ringed white-eye (Zosterops anomalus)
- Green-fronted white-eye (Zosterops minor)
- Black-fronted white-eye (Zosterops chrysolaemus) – split from Z. minor
- Tagula white-eye (Zosterops meeki)
- Morotai white-eye (Zosterops dehaani) – split from Z. atriceps
- Cream-throated white-eye (Zosterops atriceps)
- Buru white-eye (Zosterops buruensis)
- Seram white-eye (Zosterops stalkeri)
- Javan white-eye (Zosterops flavus)
- Ashy-bellied white-eye (Zosterops citrinella)
- Canary white-eye (Zosterops luteus)
- Silvereye (Zosterops lateralis)
- Hume's white-eye (Zosterops auriventer) – split from Z. poliogastrus
- Sangkar white-eye (Zosterops melanurus) – split from Z. palpebrosus
- Everett's white-eye (Zosterops everetti)
- Vella Lavella white-eye (Zosterops vellalavella)
- Santa Cruz white-eye (Zosterops sanctaecrucis)
- Capped white-eye (Zosterops fuscicapilla) (includes Oya Tabu white-eye)
- Vanuatu white-eye (Zosterops flavifrons)
- Bare-eyed white-eye (Zosterops superciliosus)
- Sanford's white-eye (Zosterops lacertosus)
- Vanikoro white-eye (Zosterops gibbsi)
- Fiji white-eye (Zosterops explorator)
- Bismarck white-eye (Zosterops hypoxanthus)
- Biak white-eye (Zosterops mysorensis)
- Bougainville white-eye (Zosterops hamlini) – split from Z. rendovae
- Guadalcanal white-eye (Zosterops oblitus) – split from Z. rendovae
- Makira white-eye (Zosterops rendovae)
- Olive-colored white-eye (Zosterops oleagineus)
- Dusky white-eye (Zosterops finschii)
- Grey-brown white-eye (Zosterops ponapensis)
- Kosrae white-eye (Zosterops cinereus)
- Rota white-eye (Zosterops rotensis)
- Yellow-throated white-eye (Zosterops metcalfii)
- Malaita white-eye (Zosterops stresemanni)
- Papuan white-eye (Zosterops novaeguineae)
- Ambon white-eye (Zosterops kuehni)
- Kai Besar white-eye (Zosterops grayi)
- Gizo white-eye (Zosterops luteirostris)
- Kai Kecil white-eye (Zosterops uropygialis)
- Ranongga white-eye (Zosterops splendidus)
- Solomons white-eye (Zosterops kulambangrae)
- Dark-eyed white-eye (Zosterops tetiparius)
- Christmas white-eye (Zosterops natalis)
- †Bridled white-eye (Zosterops conspicillatus)
- Citrine white-eye (Zosterops semperi)
- Plain white-eye (Zosterops hypolais)
- Wangi Wangi white eye (Zosterops paruhbesar)
- Louisiade white-eye (Zosterops griseotinctus)
- Kolombangara white-eye (Zosterops murphyi)
- Large Lifou white-eye (Zosterops inornatus)
- † White-chested white-eye (Zosterops albogularis)
- Samoan white-eye (Zosterops samoensis)
- † Robust white-eye (Zosterops strenuus)
- Slender-billed white-eye (Zosterops tenuirostris)
- Small Lifou white-eye (Zosterops minutus)
- Green-backed white-eye (Zosterops xanthochroa)
- Rennell white-eye (Zosterops rennellianus)
- Saipan white-eye (Zosterops saypani)
