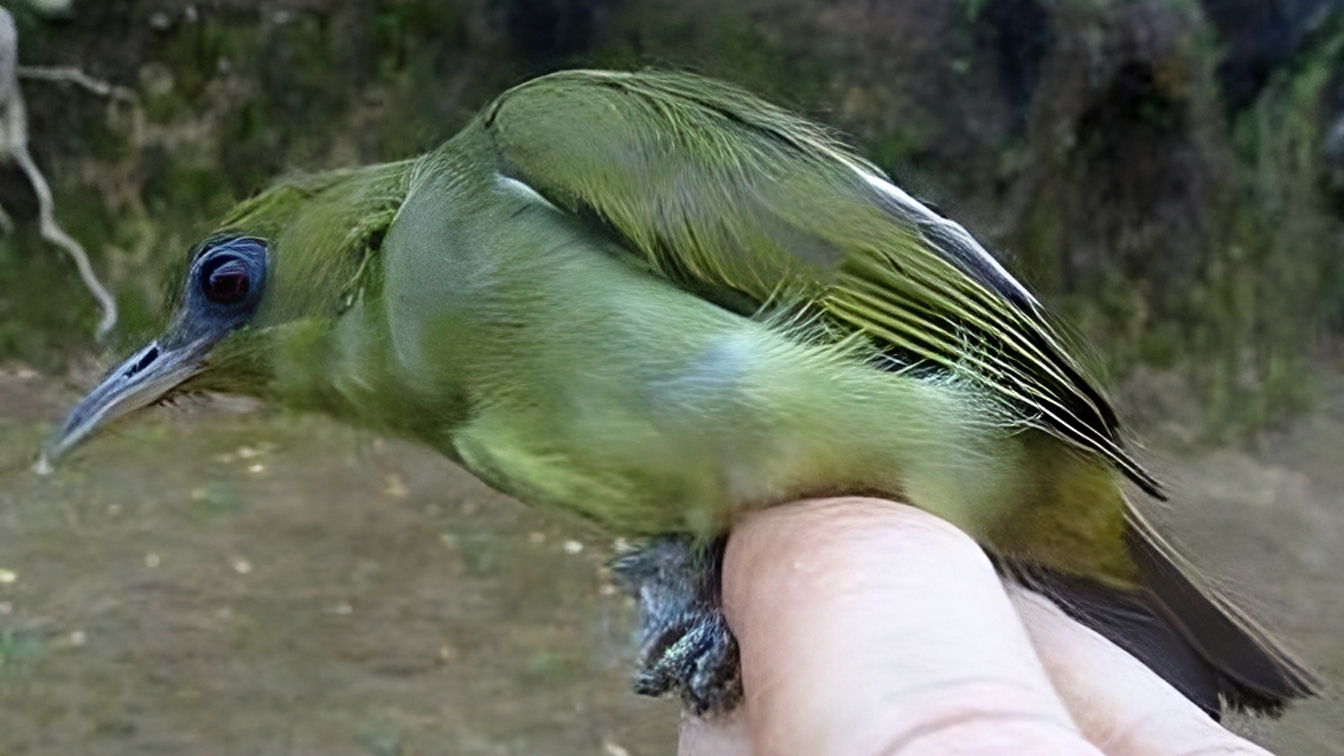

Conservation status
- Least Concern (IUCN 3.1)

Scientific classification
- Kingdom: Animalia
- Phylum: Chordata
- Class: Aves
- Order: Passeriformes
- Family: Zosteropidae
- Genus: Zosterops
- Species: Z. stresemanni

Binomial name
- Zosterops stresemanni Mayr, 1931
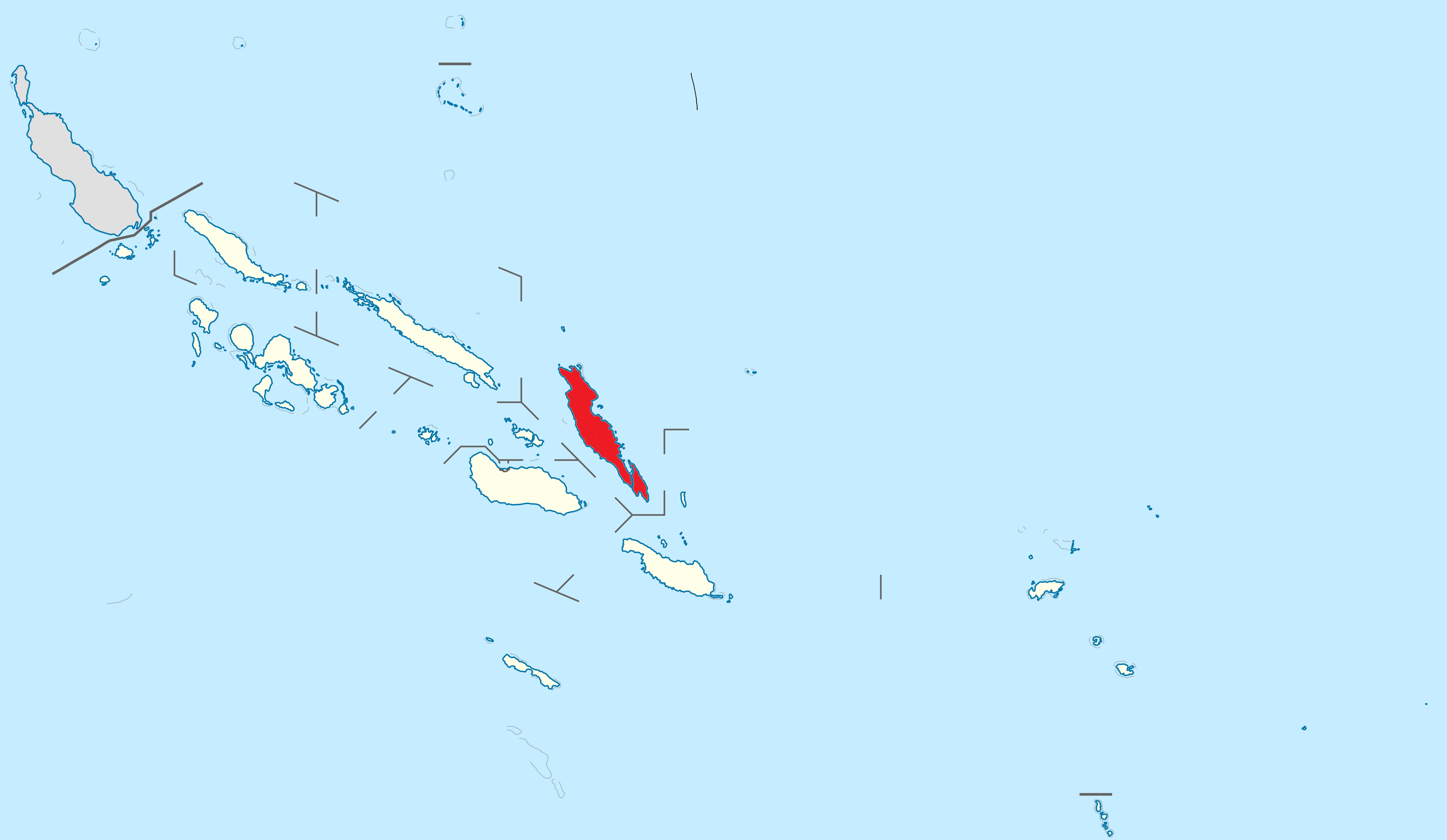

= Malaita white-eye =

Species of bird

The Malaita white-eye (Zosterops stresemanni) is a species of bird in the family Zosteropidae. It is endemic to Malaita in the Solomon Islands.
