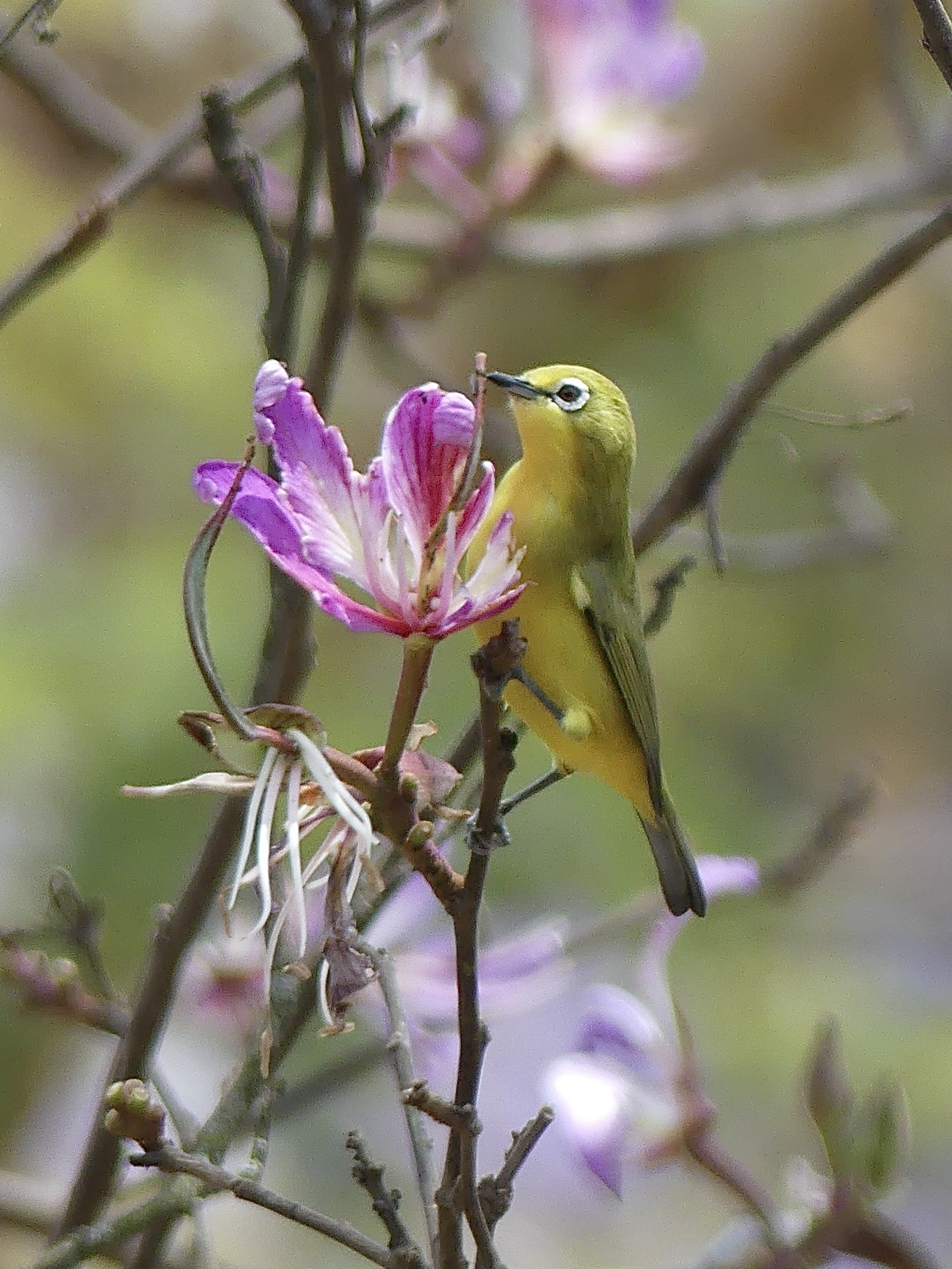

Conservation status
- Least Concern (IUCN 3.1)

Scientific classification
- Kingdom: Animalia
- Phylum: Chordata
- Class: Aves
- Order: Passeriformes
- Family: Zosteropidae
- Genus: Zosterops
- Species: Z. flavilateralis

Binomial name
- Zosterops flavilateralis Reichenow, 1892

= Pale white-eye =

Species of bird

The pale white-eye also known as Kenya white-eye (Zosterops flavilateralis) is a bird species in the family Zosteropidae. It is found in Kenya, eastern Tanzania, southern Ethiopia and southern Somalia.

== Taxonomy ==
The pale white-eye was formally described in 1892 by the German ornithologist Anton Reichenow under the current binomial name Zosterops flavilateralis. The specific epithet flavilateralis combines Latin flavus meaning "yellow" with lateralis meaning "of the sides". The pale white-eye was formerly treated as a subspecies of the Abyssinian white-eye (Zosterops abyssinicus) but is now treated as a separate species.

Two subspecies are recognised:

- Z. f. flavilateralis Reichenow, 1892 – central, east Kenya to east Tanzania
- Z. f. jubaensis Erlanger, 1901 – south Ethiopia, south Somalia and north Kenya
