= Sanford's white-eye =

Conservation status
- Near Threatened (IUCN 3.1)

Scientific classification
- Kingdom: Animalia
- Phylum: Chordata
- Class: Aves
- Order: Passeriformes
- Family: Zosteropidae
- Genus: Zosterops
- Species: Z. lacertosus

Binomial name
- Zosterops lacertosus (Murphy & Mathews, 1929)

Synonyms
- Woodfordia lacterosa

Species of bird

Sanford's white-eye (Zosterops lacertosus) is a species of bird in the family Zosteropidae. It is endemic to Nendo Island. It is named after Leonard Cutler Sanford, a trustee of the American Museum of Natural History.

Z. lacertosus is monotypic (there are no subspecies).

== Appearance ==
The Sanford's white-eye's average size is 15-16cm. It also has a narrow white eyering, making the eyes pop, and brown tails. Both males and females look the same. Its brown-feathered body has an olive wash on the throat. It has straw light yellow legs. It is primarily recognized for its distinctive white rings around its eyes, which is a common feature in the white-eye family. The white-eye family is also known for being very social. It typically has olive-green plumage with yellowish tones on its underparts.

== Habitat and diet ==
The Sanford's white-eye is found in habitats such as degraded forests, primary forests, forest edges, and secondary growth. It prefers areas with dense forest cover, which provide plenty of food and shelter. Because of this, it is classified as near threatened because its habitat quality is declining due to commercial logging. It sometimes feeds on tropical fruit and eats in the canopy and middle story. They primarily feed on insects, nectar, and small fruits, making it an important species for pollination and seed dispersal in its ecosystem.

== Behavior ==
They are known for their rapid movements as they fly through the trees in search of food. They forge in pairs. When in flocks, they frequently make a basic "chirp" noise and sometimes mix with other bird species. They have distinctive high-pitched, melodious calls. These vocalizations are used for communication within flocks and between mates, especially during breeding season. Their songs help to establish territories and attract mates.

== Population and reproduction ==
The Sanford's white-eye's population size is unknown due to continued commercial logging in the Solomon Islands. Continued commercial logging as well as energy mining in the Solomon Islands is the biggest threat to this species. During their breeding season they build nests in tall trees and typically lay 2-4 unspotted blue eggs per clutch.
