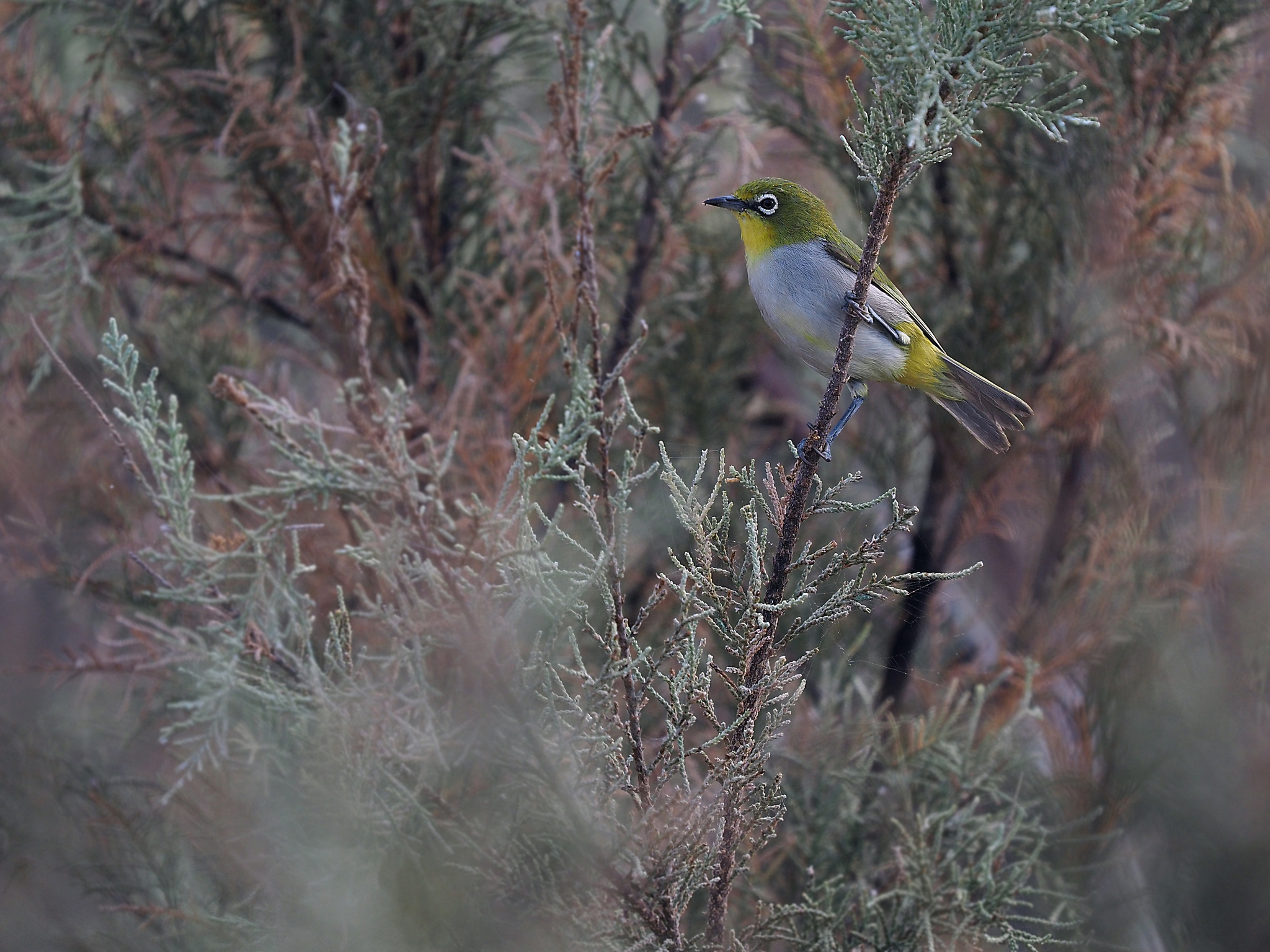

Scientific classification
- Kingdom: Animalia
- Phylum: Chordata
- Class: Aves
- Order: Passeriformes
- Family: Zosteropidae
- Genus: Zosterops
- Species: Z. socotranus

Binomial name
- Zosterops socotranus Neumann, 1908

Synonyms
- Zosterops abyssinicus socotranus

= Socotra white-eye =

Species of bird

The Socotra white-eye (Zosterops socotranus) is a bird species in the family Zosteropidae. It is found on the island of Socotra and in Somaliland.

This species was formerly treated as a subspecies of the Abyssinian white-eye (Zosterops abyssinicus) named Zosterops abyssinicus socotranus. A molecular phylogenetic study published in 2014 found that it is not closely related to the Abyssinian white-eye and it is now treated as a separate species.
