= Rennell white-eye =

Conservation status
- Least Concern (IUCN 3.1)

Scientific classification
- Kingdom: Animalia
- Phylum: Chordata
- Class: Aves
- Order: Passeriformes
- Family: Zosteropidae
- Genus: Zosterops
- Species: Z. rennellianus

Binomial name
- Zosterops rennellianus Murphy, 1929
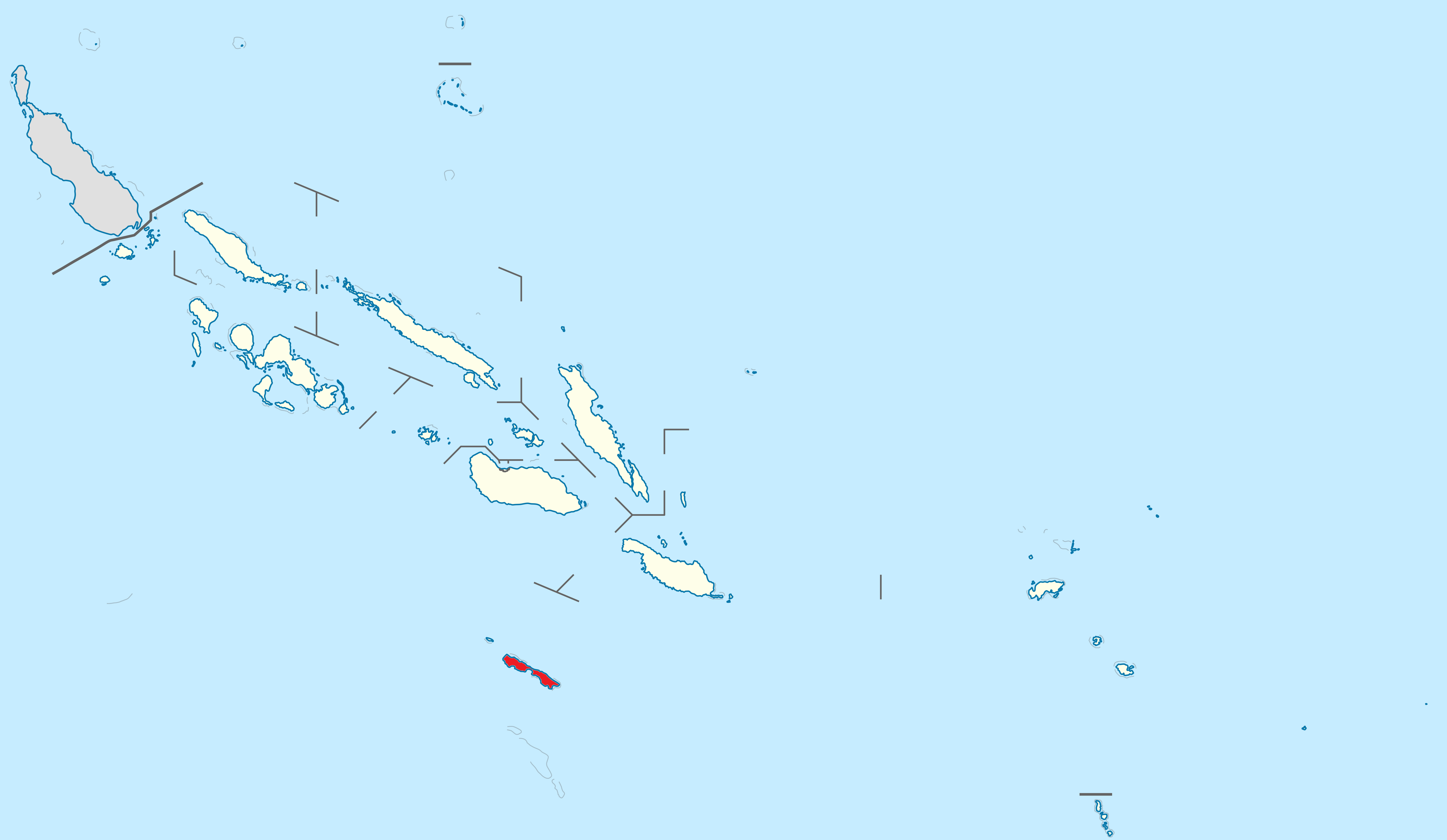

Species of bird

The Rennell white-eye (Zosterops rennellianus) or the bare-ringed white-eye, is a species of bird in the family Zosteropidae. It is endemic to Rennell Island in the Solomon Islands. Its natural habitat is subtropical or tropical moist lowland forests.
