= Bare-eyed white-eye =

Conservation status
- Least Concern (IUCN 3.1)

Scientific classification
- Kingdom: Animalia
- Phylum: Chordata
- Class: Aves
- Order: Passeriformes
- Family: Zosteropidae
- Genus: Zosterops
- Species: Z. superciliosus

Binomial name
- Zosterops superciliosus (North, 1906)

Species of bird

The bare-eyed white-eye (Zosterops superciliosus) is a species of bird in the family Zosteropidae. It is endemic to Rennell Island in the Solomon Islands, specifically the subtropical to tropical moist forests.

== Etymology and taxonomy ==
The specific epithet, superciliosus, comes from the Latin superciliosus, meaning "supercilious", "haughty", or "eye-browed", further derived from the Latin supercilium, meaning "eyebrow".

== Description ==
The dominant colors of the bare-eyed white-eye are brown, grey, white, and black, with some beige, yellow, and green. Its eye-ring, like many Zosterops species, is white, and its long beak is yellowish or pinkish with a variable dark tip.

From beak-tip to tail-tip, it measures 14–15 cm (5.5–5.9 in). It weighs 28.9 g (1.02 oz). Its wingspan is 14.86 cm (5.85 in). The length of its legs is 2.38 cm (0.94 in). The length of its beak is 1.22 cm (0.48 in), with width and height being 0.39 cm (0.15 in) and 0.44 cm (0.17 in), respectively.

== Habitat and ecology ==
The bare-eyed white-eye has an extent of occurrence of 980 km^{2} (380 sq mi). It lives in the subtropical to tropical moist forests of Renell Island, to which it is endemic. It is non-migratory. The population size is unknown, but is believed to be stable, and the bird is believed to be common. It reaches reproductive age at 1.2 years and commonly live to 2.3 years, though some specimens have lived to 8.59 years old. Its trophic level is that of an omnivore, and its trophic niche is that of an invertivore.
