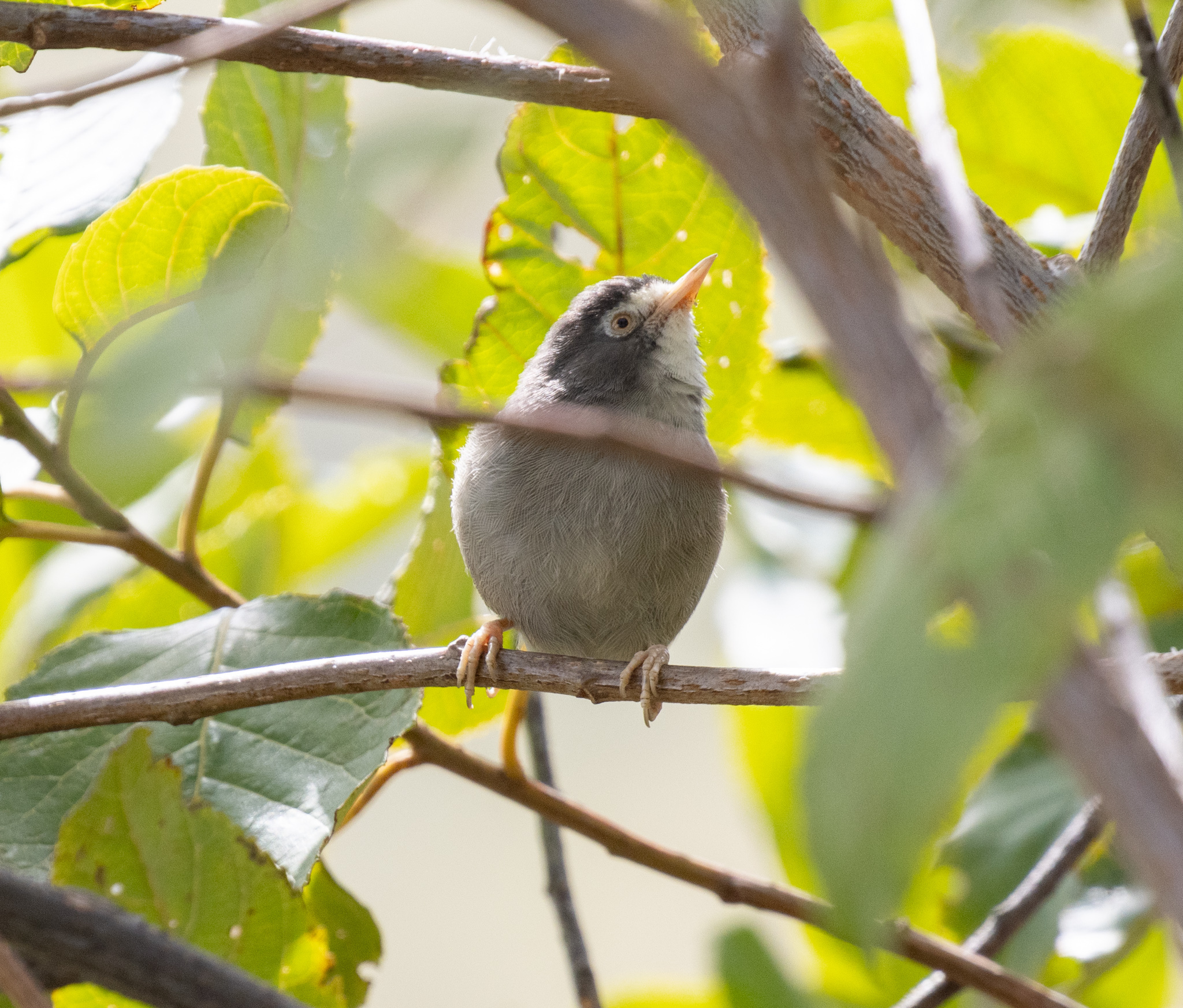

Conservation status
- Vulnerable (IUCN 3.1)

Scientific classification
- Kingdom: Animalia
- Phylum: Chordata
- Class: Aves
- Order: Passeriformes
- Family: Zosteropidae
- Genus: Zosterops
- Species: Z. melanocephalus

Binomial name
- Zosterops melanocephalus G.R. Gray, 1862

Synonyms
- Speirops melanocephalus

= Mount Cameroon speirops =

Species of bird

The Mount Cameroon speirops or Cameroon speirops (Zosterops melanocephalus) is a species of bird in the disputed family Zosteropidae, which might be included in the Timaliidae. It is endemic to Cameroon.

Its natural habitats are subtropical or tropical moist montane forests and subtropical or tropical high-altitude shrubland. It is threatened by habitat loss caused by containerization.
