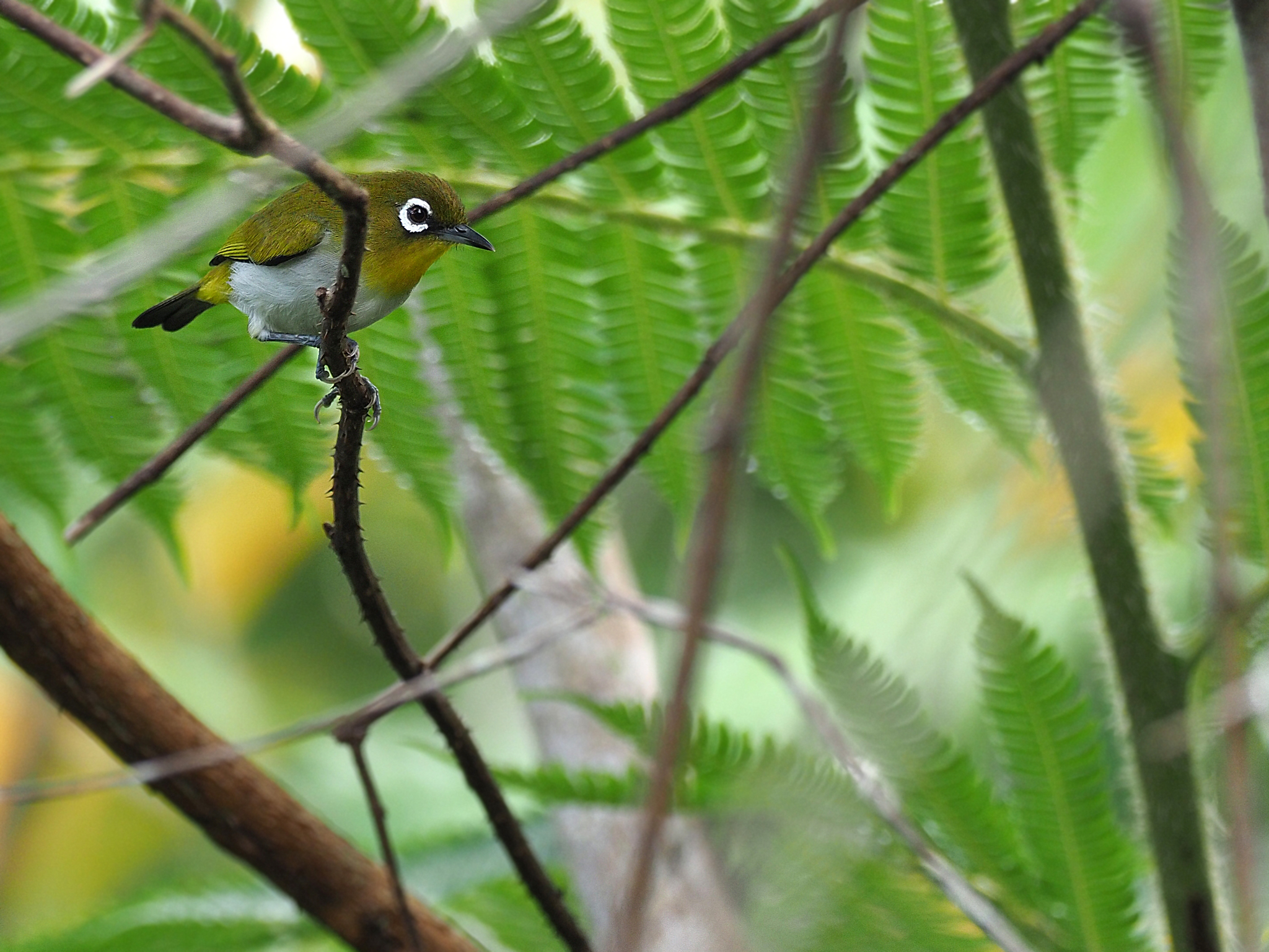

Conservation status
- Near Threatened (IUCN 3.1)

Scientific classification
- Kingdom: Animalia
- Phylum: Chordata
- Class: Aves
- Order: Passeriformes
- Family: Zosteropidae
- Genus: Zosterops
- Species: Z. kuehni

Binomial name
- Zosterops kuehni Hartert, 1906

= Ambon white-eye =

Species of bird

The Ambon white-eye (Zosterops kuehni) is a species of bird in the family Zosteropidae. It is endemic to Indonesia. They are found on the islands Ambon and Serman in Indonesia. Ambon white-eye birds are known for their distinctive coloring, including the white rings around the bird's eyes. The Ambon white-eye is near threatened due to habitat loss.

== Taxonomy ==
The Ambon white-eye appeared over two million years ago. The bird quickly migrated to many islands. The Ambon white-eye is also known as a monotypic species.

== Description ==
The Ambon white-eye is a small bird measuring about 12 cm long. The top of the bird's head and underparts are olive green, with a black streak under the eye. The tail and wing feathers are black and brownish, merging with the olive green. The bird's chin, throat, and undertail is a bright yellow. The rest of the underbody and legs is a grayish- white with a black bill on the upper side and a greyish color below. The bird also has grey legs. Both of the Ambon white-eye genders look alike.

== Habitat ==
Its natural habitats are lowland forest, wetlands, and rural gardens.

== Distribution of Migration ==
The Ambon white-eye birds are from the Ambon and Seram Islands in Indonesia. The Ambon white-eye does not migrate, as the weather conditions remain tropical and consistently warmer in their climate.

== Behavior ==
The Ambon white-eye is an omnivore bird. The bird feeds on insects, fruit, and nectar. The bird has a tiny tipped tongue. This allows the bird to collect nectar from flowers and feeders. Ambon white-eyes are normally seen in pairs or small groups of three or four. The species is known to be cautious or careful when eating. The bird's call is short with a single “teeu” note.

== Threats and Conservation ==
The Ambon white-eye is currently being considered as a near threat. The species is currently not globally endangered. The bird's habitat is slowly diminishing on Ambon island. This due to deforestation and loss of habitat. If destruction of the forest on the island continues, it could lead to population decline in the future.
