= Tagula white-eye =

Conservation status
- Near Threatened (IUCN 3.1)

Scientific classification
- Kingdom: Animalia
- Phylum: Chordata
- Class: Aves
- Order: Passeriformes
- Family: Zosteropidae
- Genus: Zosterops
- Species: Z. meeki

Binomial name
- Zosterops meeki Hartert, 1898

Species of bird

The Tagula white-eye or white-throated white-eye (Zosterops meeki) is a species of bird in the family Zosteropidae. It is endemic to Papua New Guinea.
