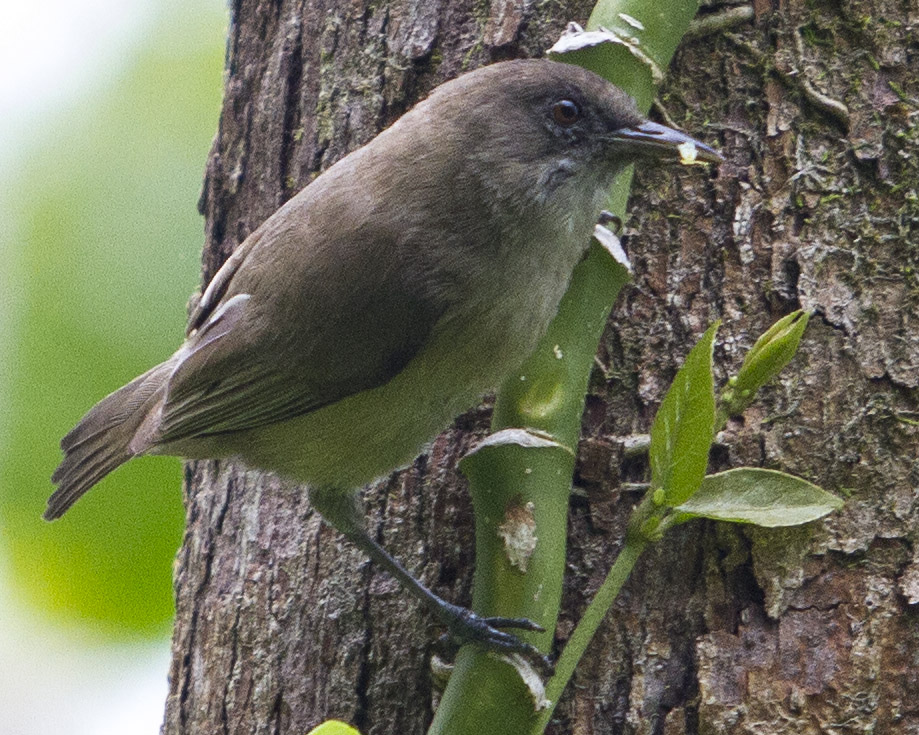

Conservation status
- Least Concern (IUCN 3.1)

Scientific classification
- Kingdom: Animalia
- Phylum: Chordata
- Class: Aves
- Order: Passeriformes
- Family: Zosteropidae
- Genus: Zosterops
- Species: Z. finschii

Binomial name
- Zosterops finschii (Hartlaub, 1868)

= Dusky white-eye =

Species of bird

The dusky white-eye (Zosterops finschii) is a species of bird in the family Zosteropidae. It is endemic to Palau.

Its natural habitat is subtropical or tropical moist lowland forests.
