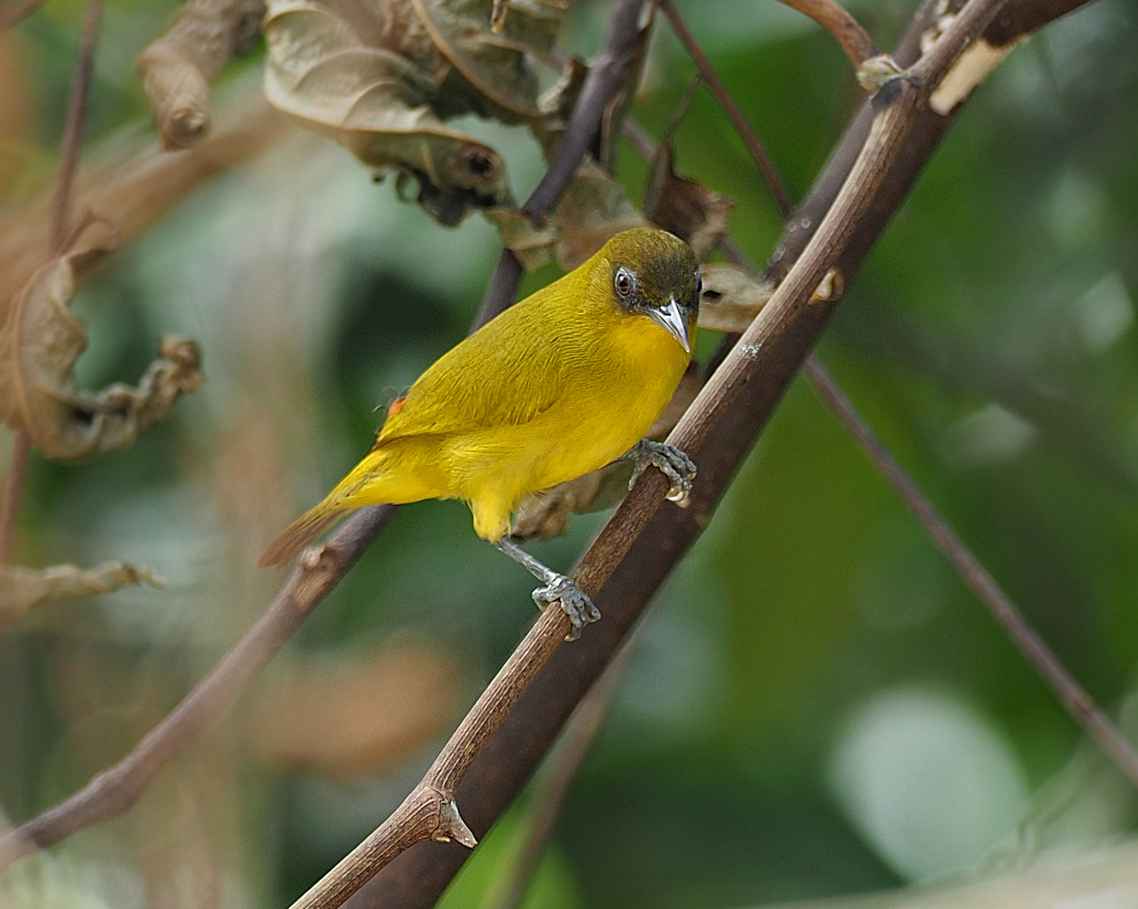

Conservation status
- Near Threatened (IUCN 3.1)

Scientific classification
- Kingdom: Animalia
- Phylum: Chordata
- Class: Aves
- Order: Passeriformes
- Family: Zosteropidae
- Genus: Zosterops
- Species: Z. uropygialis

Binomial name
- Zosterops uropygialis Salvadori, 1874

= Kai Kecil white-eye =

Species of bird

The Kai Kecil white-eye (Zosterops uropygialis), also known as the golden-bellied white-eye, is a species of bird in the family Zosteropidae. It is native to the Kai Islands in Indonesia.

Its natural habitat is subtropical or tropical moist lowland forests. It is threatened by habitat loss.
