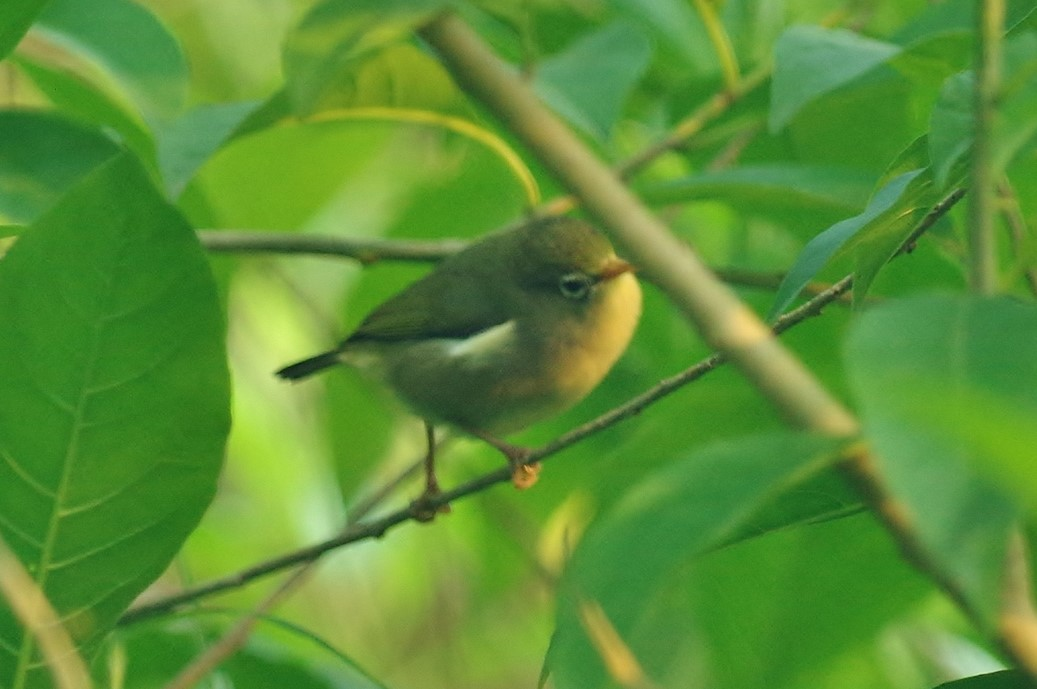

Conservation status
- Near Threatened (IUCN 3.1)

Scientific classification
- Kingdom: Animalia
- Phylum: Chordata
- Class: Aves
- Order: Passeriformes
- Family: Zosteropidae
- Genus: Zosterops
- Species: Z. feae

Binomial name
- Zosterops feae Salvadori, 1901
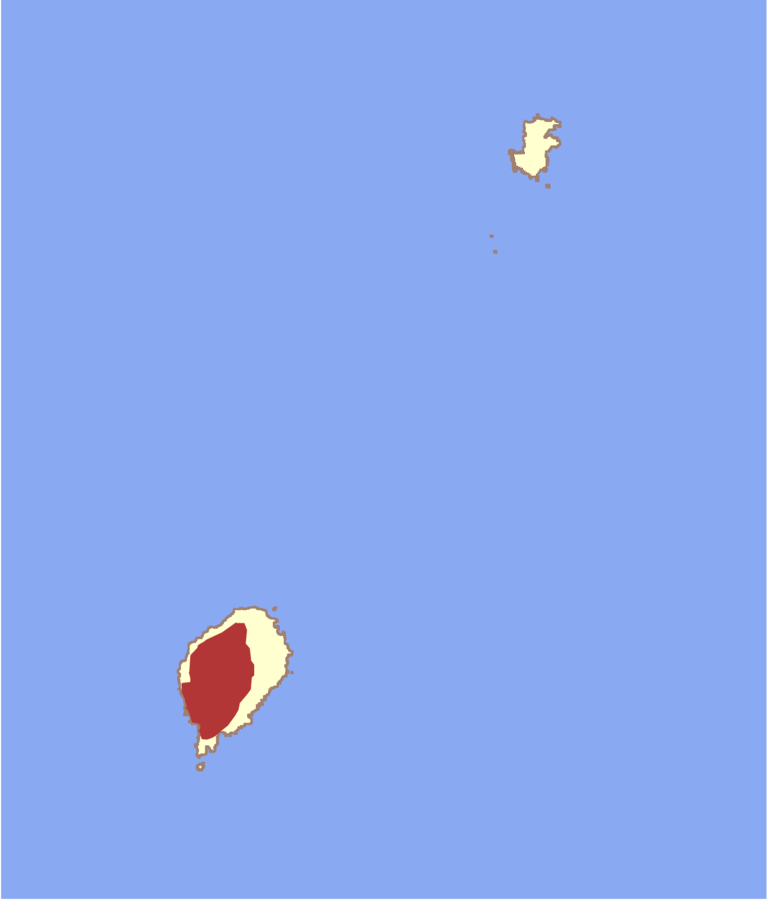
- range on São Tomé

Synonyms
- Zosterops ficedulina feae; Zosterops ficedulinus feae

= São Tomé white-eye =

Species of bird

The São Tomé white-eye (Zosterops feae) is a species of bird in the family Zosteropidae. It is endemic to the island of São Tomé, where it occurs in the central massif and in the southwest. Its natural habitat is mid- to high-altitude forests. It is threatened by habitat loss. It was named by the Italian Tommaso Salvadori in 1901.
