= Kolombangara white-eye =

Kolombangra white-eye

Conservation status
- Least Concern (IUCN 3.1)

Scientific classification
- Kingdom: Animalia
- Phylum: Chordata
- Class: Aves
- Order: Passeriformes
- Family: Zosteropidae
- Genus: Zosterops
- Species: Z. murphyi

Binomial name
- Zosterops murphyi Hartert, 1929

Species of bird

The Kolombangara white-eye or hermit white-eye (Zosterops murphyi) is a species of bird in the family Zosteropidae. It is endemic to the Solomon Islands.
