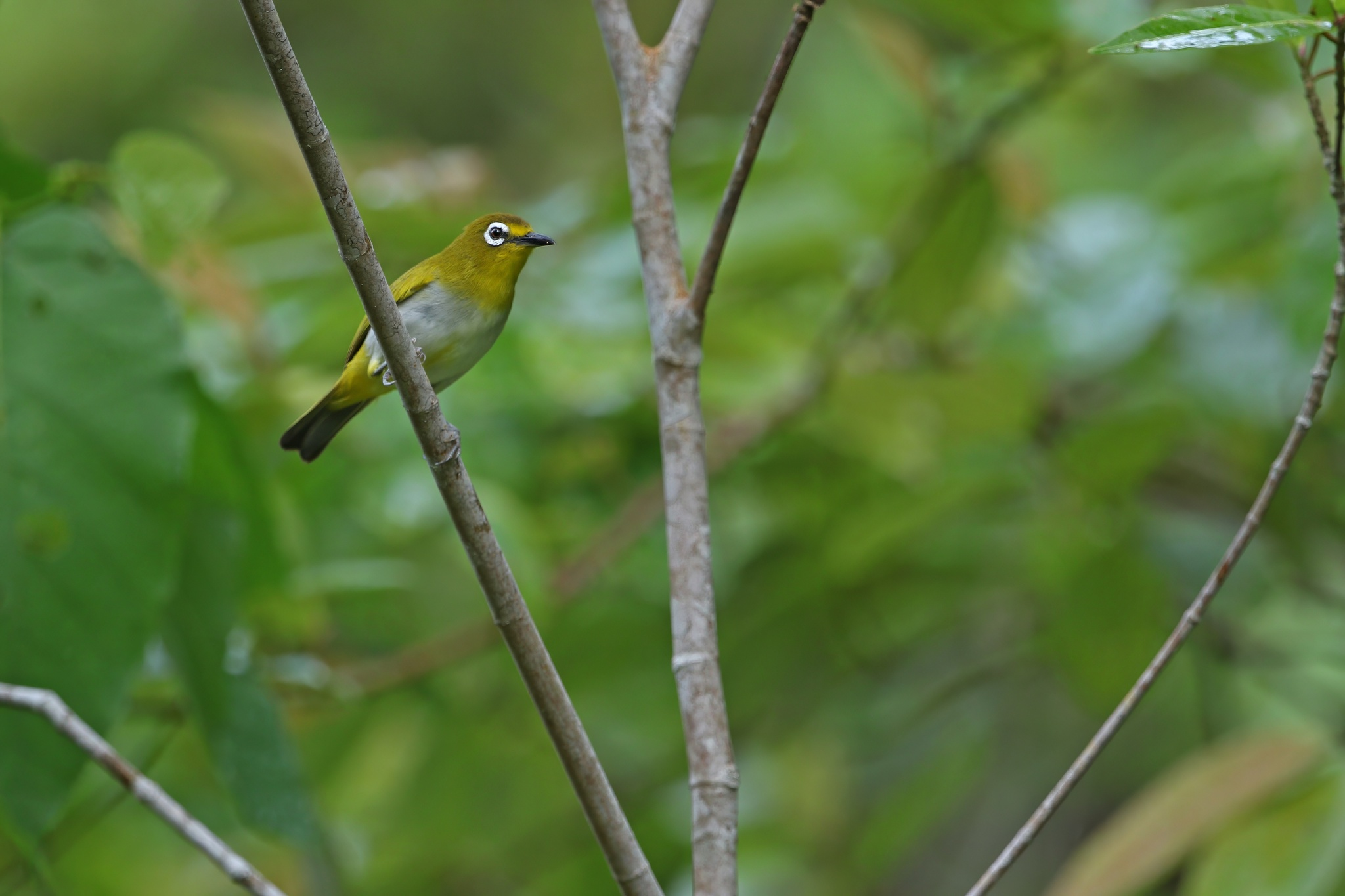

Conservation status
- Near Threatened (IUCN 3.1)

Scientific classification
- Kingdom: Animalia
- Phylum: Chordata
- Class: Aves
- Order: Passeriformes
- Family: Zosteropidae
- Genus: Zosterops
- Species: Z. grayi

Binomial name
- Zosterops grayi Wallace, 1864

= Kai Besar white-eye =

Species of bird

The Kai Besar white-eye (Zosterops grayi), also known as the pearl-bellied white-eye, is a species of bird in the family Zosteropidae. It is native to the Kai Islands in Indonesia.

Its natural habitat is subtropical or tropical moist lowland forests. It is threatened by habitat loss.
