= Vella Lavella white-eye =

Conservation status
- Near Threatened (IUCN 3.1)

Scientific classification
- Kingdom: Animalia
- Phylum: Chordata
- Class: Aves
- Order: Passeriformes
- Family: Zosteropidae
- Genus: Zosterops
- Species: Z. vellalavella

Binomial name
- Zosterops vellalavella Hartert, 1908

Species of bird

The Vella Lavella white-eye, belted white-eye, or banded white-eye (Zosterops vellalavella) is a species of bird in the family Zosteropidae. It is endemic to the Solomon Islands.

Its natural habitat is subtropical or tropical moist lowland forests. It is threatened by habitat loss.
