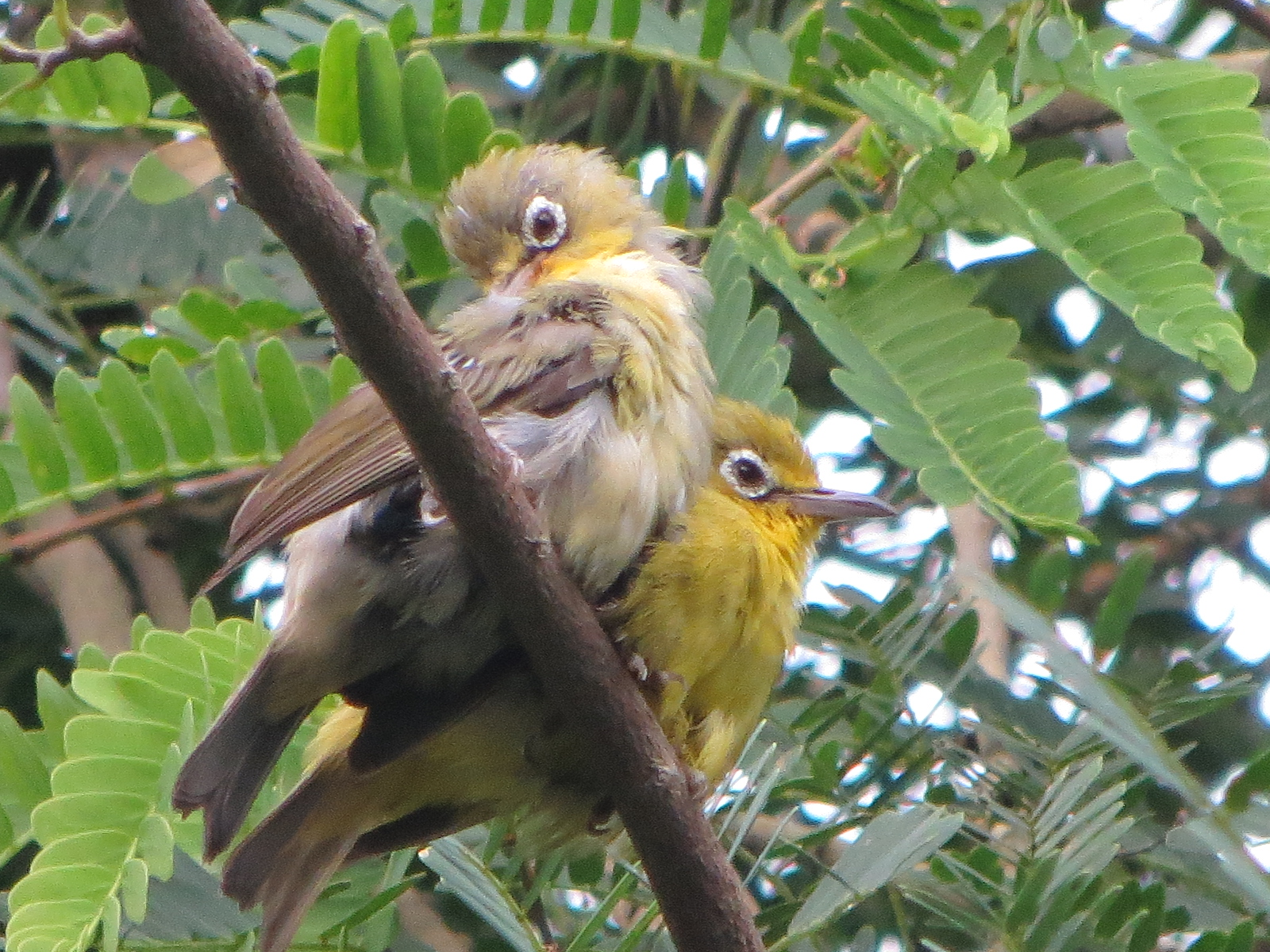

Conservation status
- Least Concern (IUCN 3.1)

Scientific classification
- Kingdom: Animalia
- Phylum: Chordata
- Class: Aves
- Order: Passeriformes
- Family: Zosteropidae
- Genus: Zosterops
- Species: Z. consobrinorum

Binomial name
- Zosterops consobrinorum Meyer, 1904

= Pale-bellied white-eye =

Species of bird

The pale-bellied white-eye (Zosterops consobrinorum) is a species of bird in the family Zosteropidae. It is endemic to SE Sulawesi in Indonesia. Its natural habitat is subtropical or tropical moist lowland forest. The species has a limited distribution and also appears to be sensitive to human disturbance.

== Taxonomy and systematics ==
Although not yet recognized as a subspecies of the pale-bellied white-eye, in 2003 a similar bird was discovered near the village of Wanci on Wangi-wangi Island and provisionally named the Wangi-Wangi white-eye (Zosterops sp. nov.). This island is its only known home and is part of the Tukangbesi Islands to the southeast of Sulawesi in Indonesia.

The Wangi-Wangi white-eye has a number of differences from the pale-bellied white-eye including larger size, a black body, a long yellow beak, a gray breast and pale feet. Like most white-eyes it has a white ring around the eye and green upperparts.
