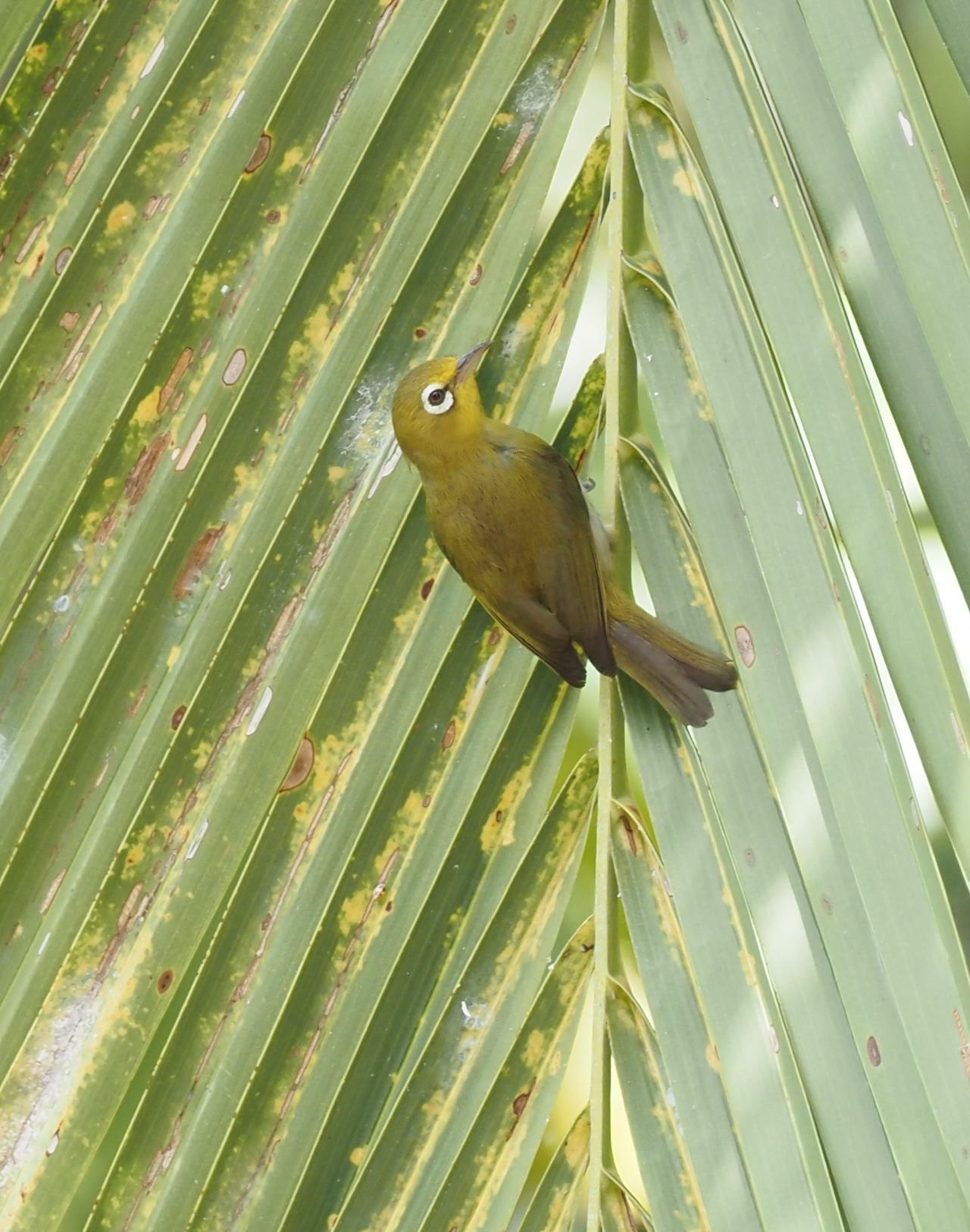

Conservation status
- Least Concern (IUCN 3.1)

Scientific classification
- Kingdom: Animalia
- Phylum: Chordata
- Class: Aves
- Order: Passeriformes
- Family: Zosteropidae
- Genus: Zosterops
- Species: Z. minutus

Binomial name
- Zosterops minutus Layard, 1878

= Small Lifou white-eye =

Species of bird

The small Lifou white-eye (Zosterops minutus), also known as the sulphur white-eye, is a species of bird in the family Zosteropidae. It is endemic to the island of Lifou in New Caledonia.
