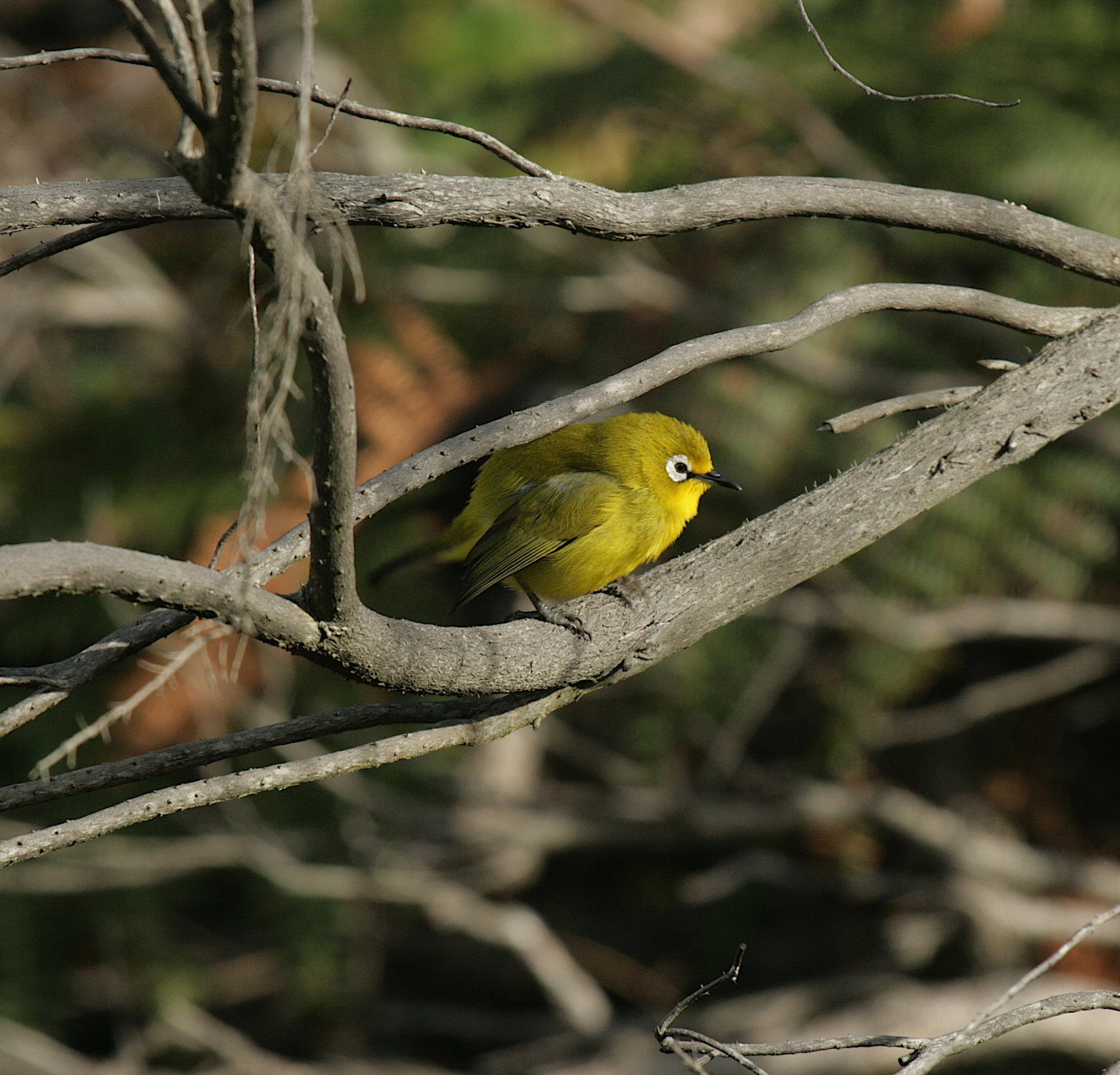

Conservation status
- Least Concern (IUCN 3.1)

Scientific classification
- Kingdom: Animalia
- Phylum: Chordata
- Class: Aves
- Order: Passeriformes
- Family: Zosteropidae
- Genus: Zosterops
- Species: Z. kirki

Binomial name
- Zosterops kirki Shelley, 1880

Synonyms
- Zosterops senegalensis kirki Zosterops maderaspatanus kirki

= Kirk's white-eye =

Species of bird

Kirk's white-eye (Zosterops kirki) is a species of bird in the family Zosteropidae. It is endemic to the Comoros Islands. It was previously considered a subspecies of the Malagasy white-eye. Its common and binomial name are in honour of explorer John Kirk.

== Location ==
Kirk's white-eye are found in the Comoros islands off the coast of Africa. Specifically, they are found in Ngazidja, NW Comoro Islands. Their habitat types include forest, savanna, shrubland, grassland, and artificial/terrestrial. They are residents of the islands year-round; they are not migrants.

== Diet and Feeding Behaviors ==
Kirk's White-Eye are foragers. They feed on small things such as berries and insects. Sometimes, they probe hanging upside-down due to actions of former races such as Z. maderaspatanus. Their foraging behavior is unknown, but they act in mixed, hyperactive flocks.

== Field Identification ==
They are around 10–12 centimetres (3.9–4.7 in) in length. The adult Kirk's white eye has a yellow-green forehead to the back of its neck and cheek. It is broken in the front by a black line that goes from the side of the bill to the eye. The upper body and most of the upper wing is colored yellow-green with some blackened feathers that make it darker compared to the underpart color. The other half has narrow green edges and the tail is a black/brown color. The chin and throat are also yellow and the sides are more olive-green. The central breast, belly, and the undertail-coverts and yellow as well. The eye is surrounded in a white circle, giving it its name, “Kirk’s white-eye”. The iris of their eyes are typically a reddish to light brown color. The bill is black on the top and gray on the bottom. According to eBird, their bills are small and “sharp-billed warbler-like”. There are minimal to no differences between the male and females.

== Sound and Vocal Behavior ==
Their sound is a loud, melodious call. It mainly consists of down slurred notes that cover a broad frequency range. There is a very wide range of call notes. They are said to sound similar to the nominate Z. maderaspatanus and also the Serinus finch. According to eBird, “The most common calls are a high-pitched, rising rattle and a descending “chew” note, which is also the main component of the quiet, chatty song.” Birds of the World says their call sounds like a “down slurred burry ‘peeu’”. They are fairly quiet birds though.

== Conservation ==
The bird is not currently threatened in its small, one-island territory. Within their territory, they are commonly spotted even in bird-poor plantations. Although, they are extinct from Mt Karthala and replaced by Z. mouroniensis.
