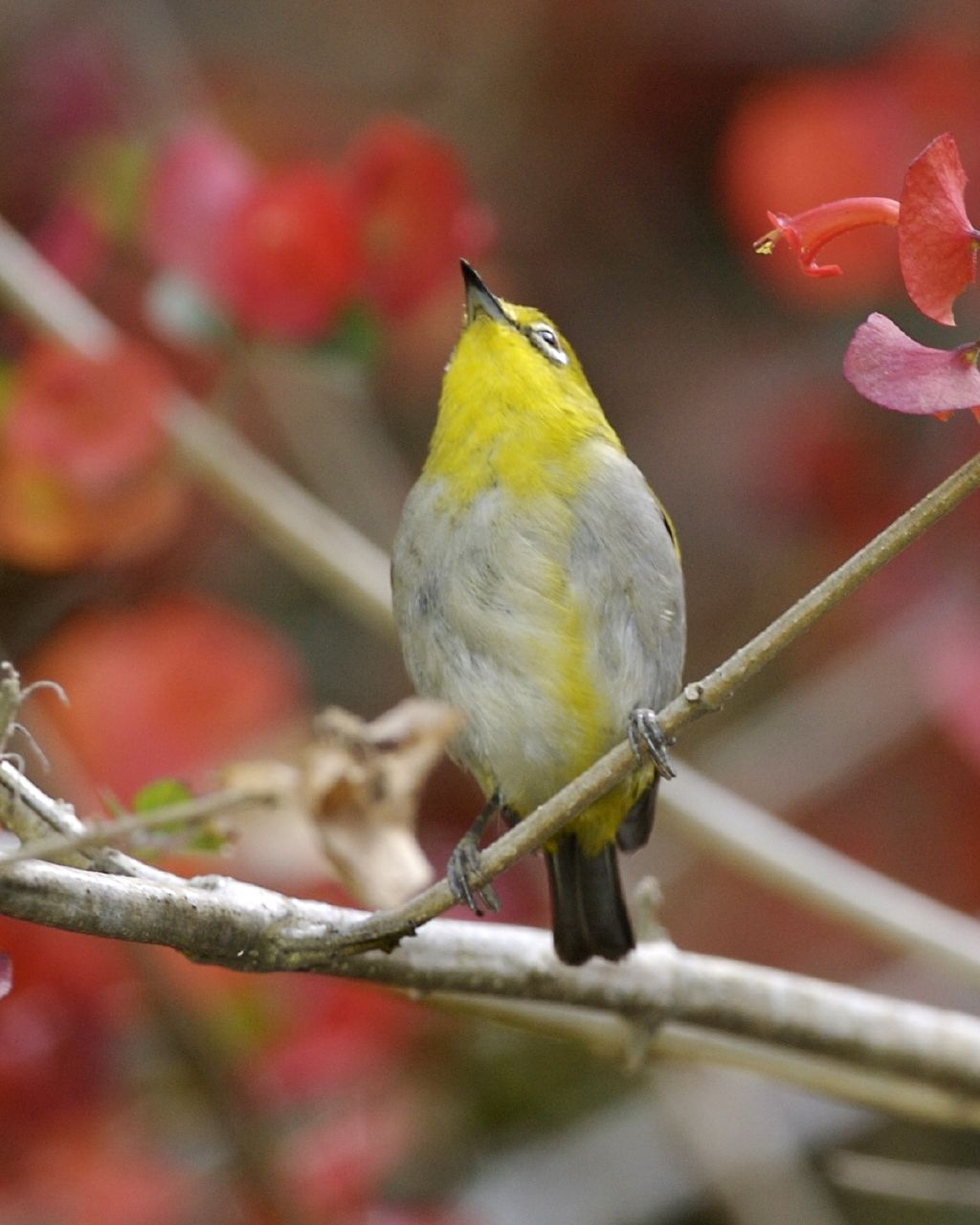

Conservation status
- Vulnerable (IUCN 3.1)

Scientific classification
- Kingdom: Animalia
- Phylum: Chordata
- Class: Aves
- Order: Passeriformes
- Family: Zosteropidae
- Genus: Zosterops
- Species: Z. melanurus

Binomial name
- Zosterops melanurus Hartlaub, 1865

= Sangkar white-eye =

Species of bird

The sangkar white-eye (Zosterops melanurus) is a bird species in the family Zosteropidae. It is also known as the Sunda white-eye. It is found in forested habitats on the Indonesian islands of Java and Bali. In Java it is typically found at elevations between 200–1,600 m (660–5,250 ft), but it sometimes occurs at lower elevations as well.

This species was formerly treated as conspecific with the Indian white-eye (previously the Oriental white-eye, Zosterops palpebrosus), but based on the results of a molecular phylogenetic study published in 2018, it was promoted to species rank.

The sangkar white-eye has two subspecies, Zosterops melanurus melanurus in eastern Java and Bali and Z. m. buxtoni in western Java. (A population of white-eyes on Sumatra that was historically considered part of the latter subspecies may in fact belong to Hume's white-eye.) The two subspecies differ notably in appearance: Z. m. melanurus has entirely yellow underparts, while Z. m. buxtoni has a grey belly. They differ little genetically, however, and commonly interbreed where their ranges overlap.

The sangkar white-eye feeds on insects, and favours the introduced Sesbania grandiflora when hunting. The breeding season is from January to October, with a peak in May and June.

The sangkar white-eye is considered threatened due to extensive trapping for the caged bird trade in Indonesia. It has the unfortunate distinction of being the most heavily trapped and traded wild bird species in the world, and its common name was coined to reflect this: sangkar translates to birdcage in Indonesian.
