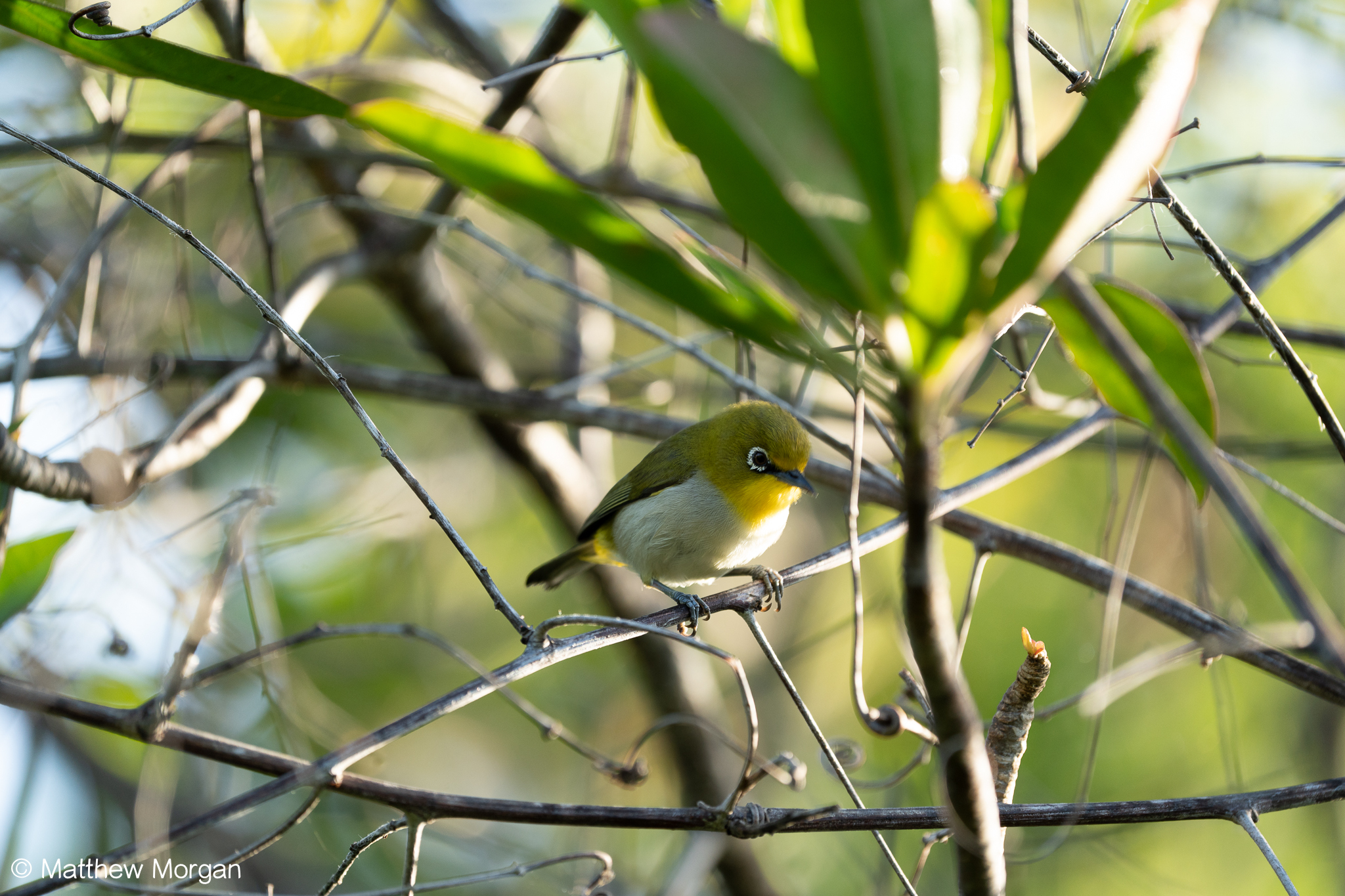

Scientific classification
- Kingdom: Animalia
- Phylum: Chordata
- Class: Aves
- Order: Passeriformes
- Family: Zosteropidae
- Genus: Zosterops
- Species: Z. aldabrensis

Binomial name
- Zosterops aldabrensis Ridgway, 1894

= Aldabra white-eye =

Species of bird

The Aldabra white-eye (Zosterops aldabrensis) is a bird species in the family Zosteropidae. It is endemic to the island of Aldabra in the Indian Ocean.

The Aldabra white-eye was formerly treated as a subspecies of the Malagasy white-eye (Zosterops maderaspatanus) but based on the results of a molecular phylogenetic study published in 2014, it is now treated as a separate species.

The Aldabra white-eye is a generalist species, with a diverse diet consisting of various plants and insects.
