= Moheli white-eye =

Scientific classification
- Kingdom: Animalia
- Phylum: Chordata
- Class: Aves
- Order: Passeriformes
- Family: Zosteropidae
- Genus: Zosterops
- Species: Z. comorensis

Binomial name
- Zosterops comorensis Shelley, 1900

Species of bird

The Moheli white-eye (Zosterops comorensis) is a species of bird in the family Zosteropidae.

It is endemic to Mohéli of the Comoros.

Its natural habitat is subtropical or tropical moist lowland forest.
