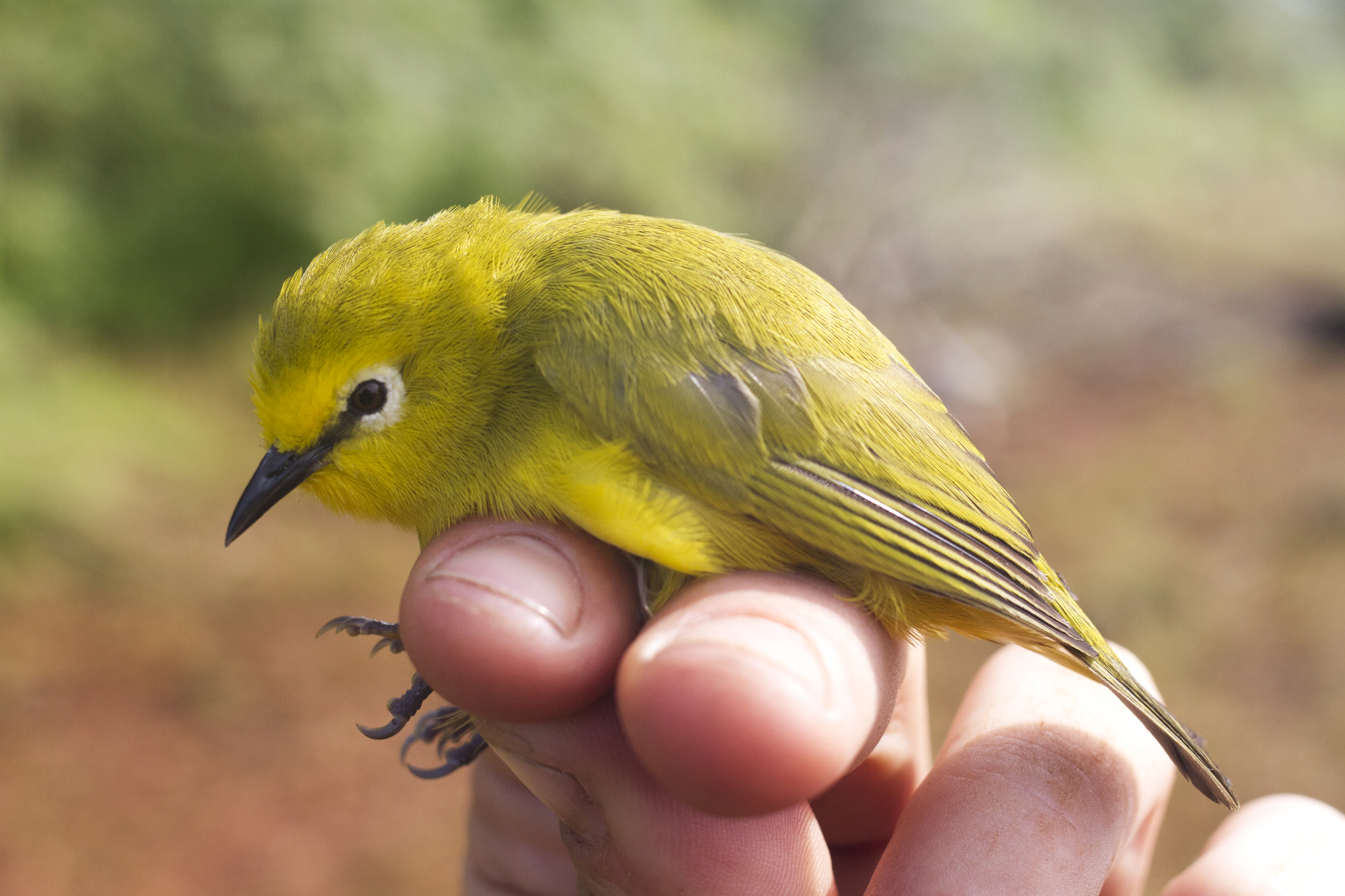

Scientific classification
- Kingdom: Animalia
- Phylum: Chordata
- Class: Aves
- Order: Passeriformes
- Family: Zosteropidae
- Genus: Zosterops
- Species: Z. stenocricotus

Binomial name
- Zosterops stenocricotus Reichenow, 1892

= Forest white-eye =

Species of bird

The forest white-eye or Cameroon green white-eye (Zosterops stenocricotus) is a species of bird in the family Zosteropidae. It is found from southeastern Nigeria to southwestern Central African Republic and northern Gabon.

Its natural habitats are subtropical, tropical moist montane forests, and subtropical or tropical high-altitude shrubland. It is threatened by habitat loss.
