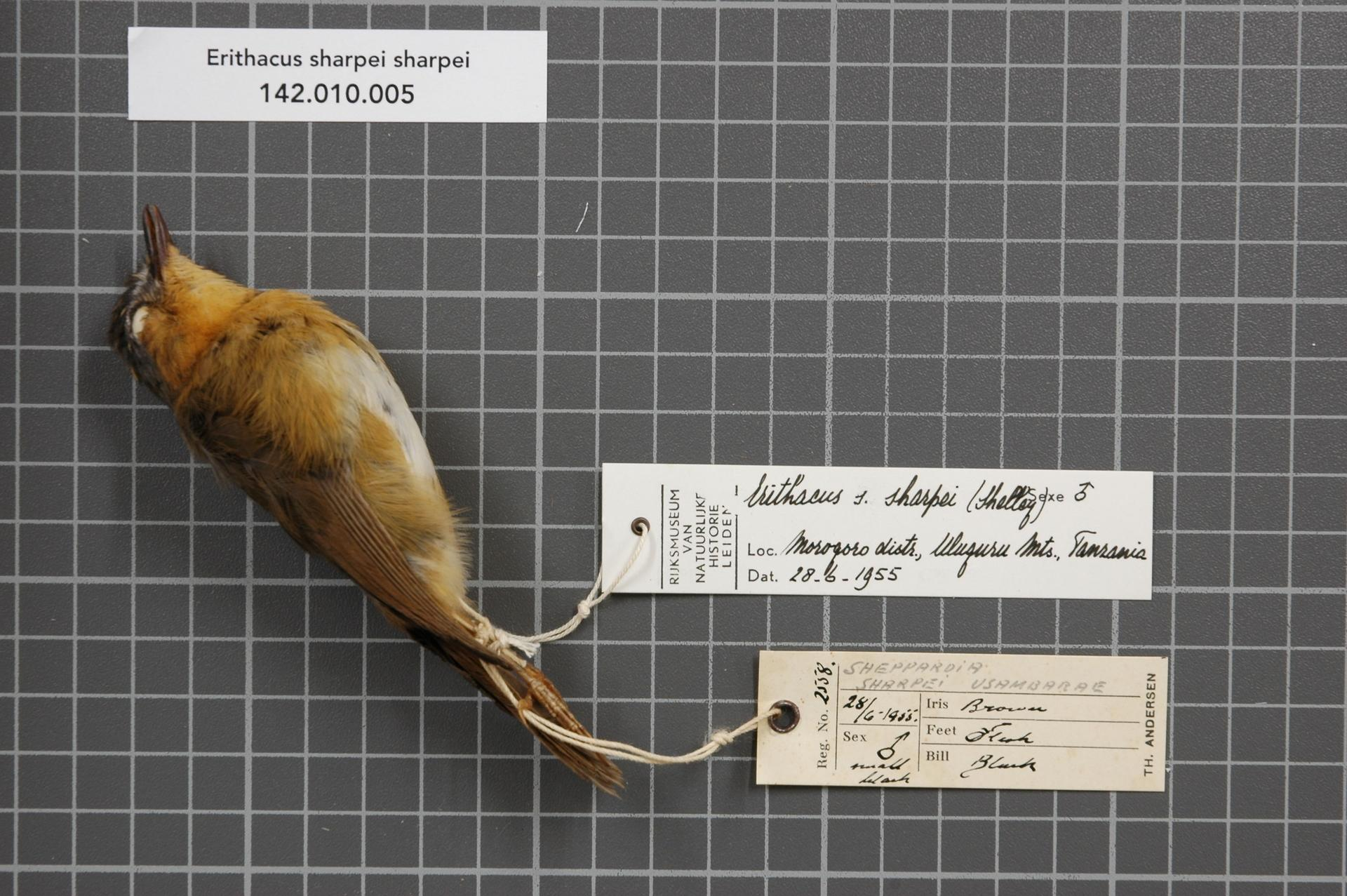

Conservation status
- Least Concern (IUCN 3.1)

Scientific classification
- Kingdom: Animalia
- Phylum: Chordata
- Class: Aves
- Order: Passeriformes
- Family: Muscicapidae
- Genus: Sheppardia
- Species: S. sharpei

Binomial name
- Sheppardia sharpei (Shelley, 1903)

= Sharpe's akalat =

Species of bird

Sharpe's akalat (Sheppardia sharpei) is a species of bird in the family Muscicapidae. It is found in Tanzania and northern parts of Zambia and Malawi. Its natural habitats are boreal forests and subtropical or tropical moist montane forests.

Sharpe's akalat was described by the English ornithologist George Ernest Shelley in 1903. He coined the binomial name Callene sharpei. Sharpe's akalat is now placed in the genus Sheppardia that was introduced by the South African ornithologist Alwin Karl Haagner in 1909. Both the common name and the specific epithet honour the English ornithologist and museum curator Richard Bowdler Sharpe.
