= C. G. Finch-Davies =

English painter (1875–1920)

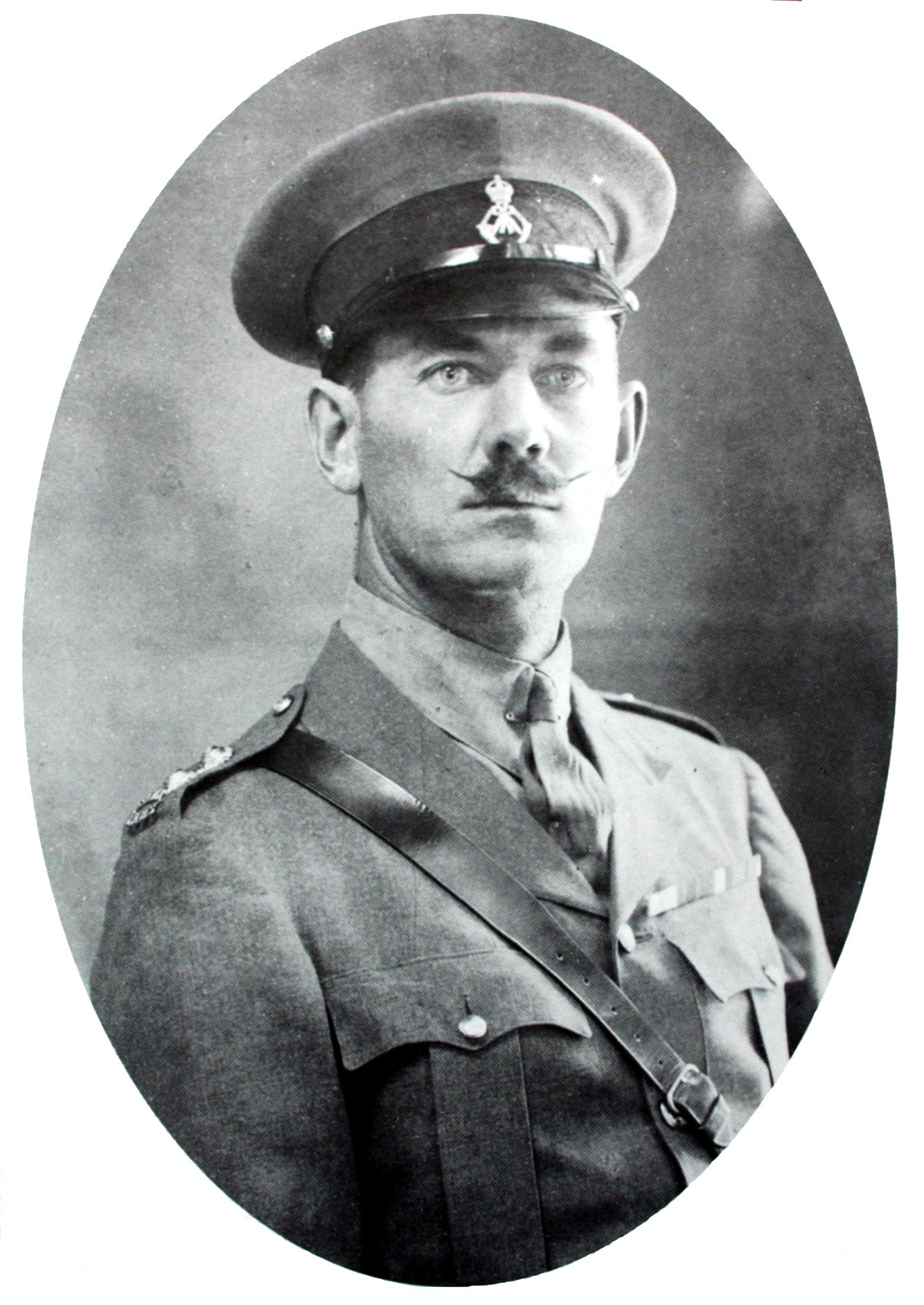
- Born: Claude Gibney Finch-Davies; 24 May 1875
- Died: 4 August 1920 (aged 45)
- Known for: Painting

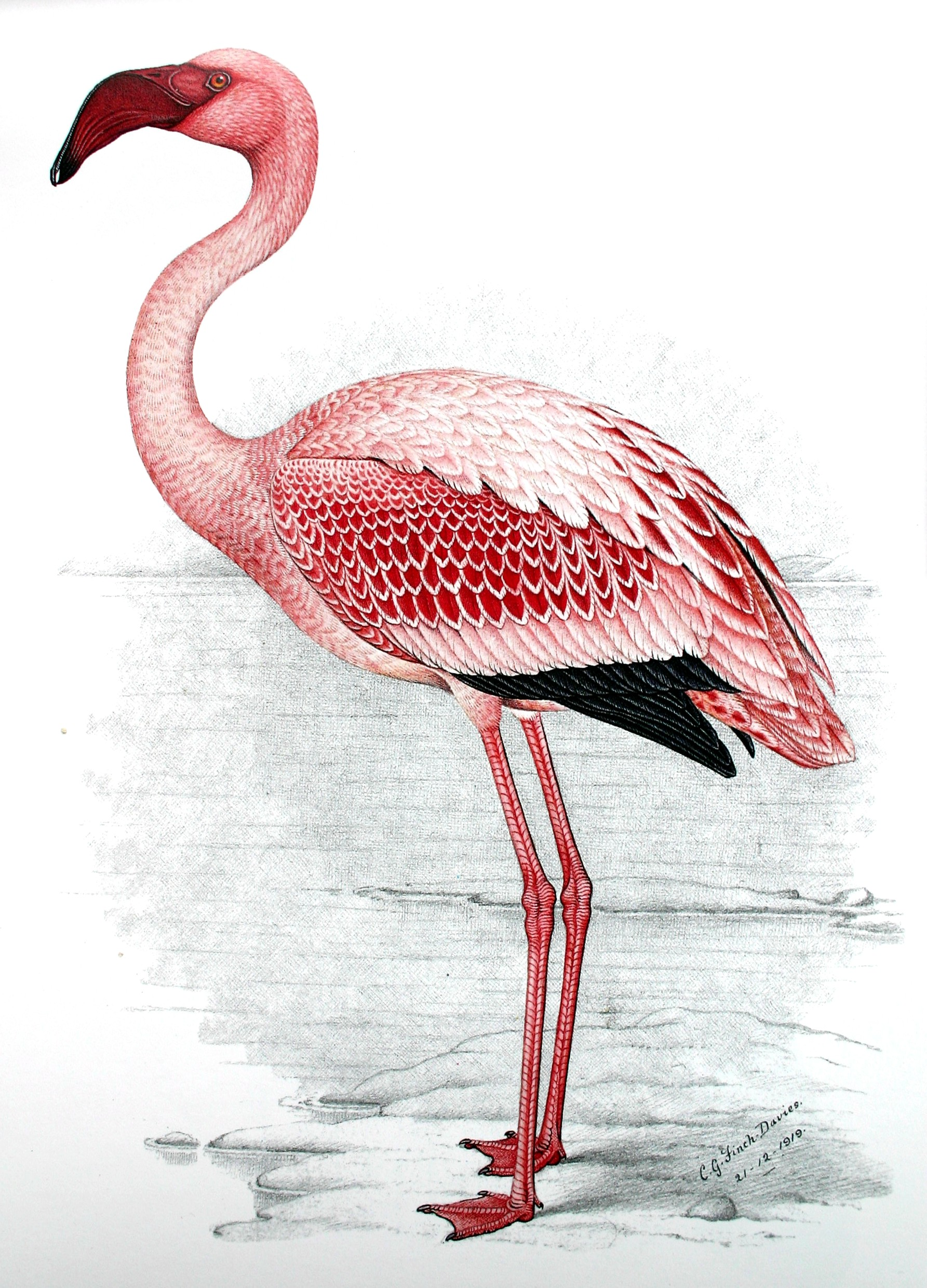
Lesser flamingo (Phoenicopterus minor)

Claude Gibney Finch-Davies (24 May 1875 – 4 August 1920) was a British soldier, ornithologist and painter who produced a series of paintings of birds of South Africa in the early part of the 20th century.

== Life history ==
He was born in Delhi, India, the third child and eldest son of Major-General Sir William and Lady Elizabeth B. Davies née Field. His father later became Governor of Delhi and was awarded the Order of the Star of India, while his mother was said to be an expert on Indian snakes. At the age of six, in keeping with the custom of the time, Davies was sent to school in England, where his scholastic performance was unenthusiastic.

Having finished his schooling, Davies joined the Cape Mounted Riflemen in 1893 at their recruiting office in London. In that same year his regiment saw service in Pondoland in South Africa. They were sent there to keep the peace after that territory had been annexed by the Cape Colony. As a professional soldier Davies was posted to various remote places in the Eastern Cape, and this fostered an interest in natural history and in particular, birdlife. Within a year or two, he was collecting bird specimens and starting sketches and paintings. In his field sketchbooks he provided copious notes about each species he illustrated – at first his own field observations, but later augmented by information culled from books and scientific journals. His style of painting rapidly evolved to show great detail in the plumage while retaining a lifelike appearance. By 1905 he had produced some 200 paintings of consistently high quality.

=== 1897-1913 ===
In 1897 Private 1st Class CG Davies, with 15 others of his regiment, was sent to London to attend the Diamond Jubilee of Queen Victoria, and was promoted to corporal on his return to South Africa. The outbreak of the Anglo-Boer War shortly after, put his birding interests on hold, but on the positive side, afforded him the opportunity of extensive travel in southern Africa. Even without the leisure time to paint, he continued to observe, make notes and collect the odd specimen. With the end of the war in 1902, he returned to Pondoland and promotion to sergeant. The next twelve years of relative peace saw Davies' improvement as artist and ornithologist. He explored the Eastern Cape thoroughly and produced paintings at the rate of about one a week. His completed sketchbooks were sent to his mother in England for safe-keeping, and she transcribed his pencilled notes and had unidentified species labelled by the British Museum (Natural History). He began contributing to scientific journals – his first article on Pondoland birds in the initial volume of the newly formed South African Ornithologists' Union, of which he was a founder member.

The president of the Ornithologists' Union at that time was Alwin Haagner, who was an assistant at the Transvaal Museum. He and Davies came to know each other through the many bird specimens he sold and donated to the Museum. Haagner used Davies' illustrations to accompany several articles describing new forms and species. At about this time Davies made the acquaintance of Major Boyd Horsbrugh who was searching for a competent artist to illustrate a book he had been working on. This collaboration led to the publishing of The Game-Birds and Waterfowl of South Africa in 1912, which besides the colour plates by Davies, incorporated many of his observations.

In 1910 with the formation of the Union of South Africa, Davies' regiment, now called the 1st South African Mounted Riflemen, was reposted to Matatiele in East Griqualand. Here he fell under the spell of the raptors and devoted his entire twentieth sketchbook, and seven more of his final ten, to this group of birds. He consulted career ornithologists such as William Robert Ogilvie-Grant at the British Museum about difficulties. This productive period of his life was once more interrupted by a declaration of hostilities – the First World War.

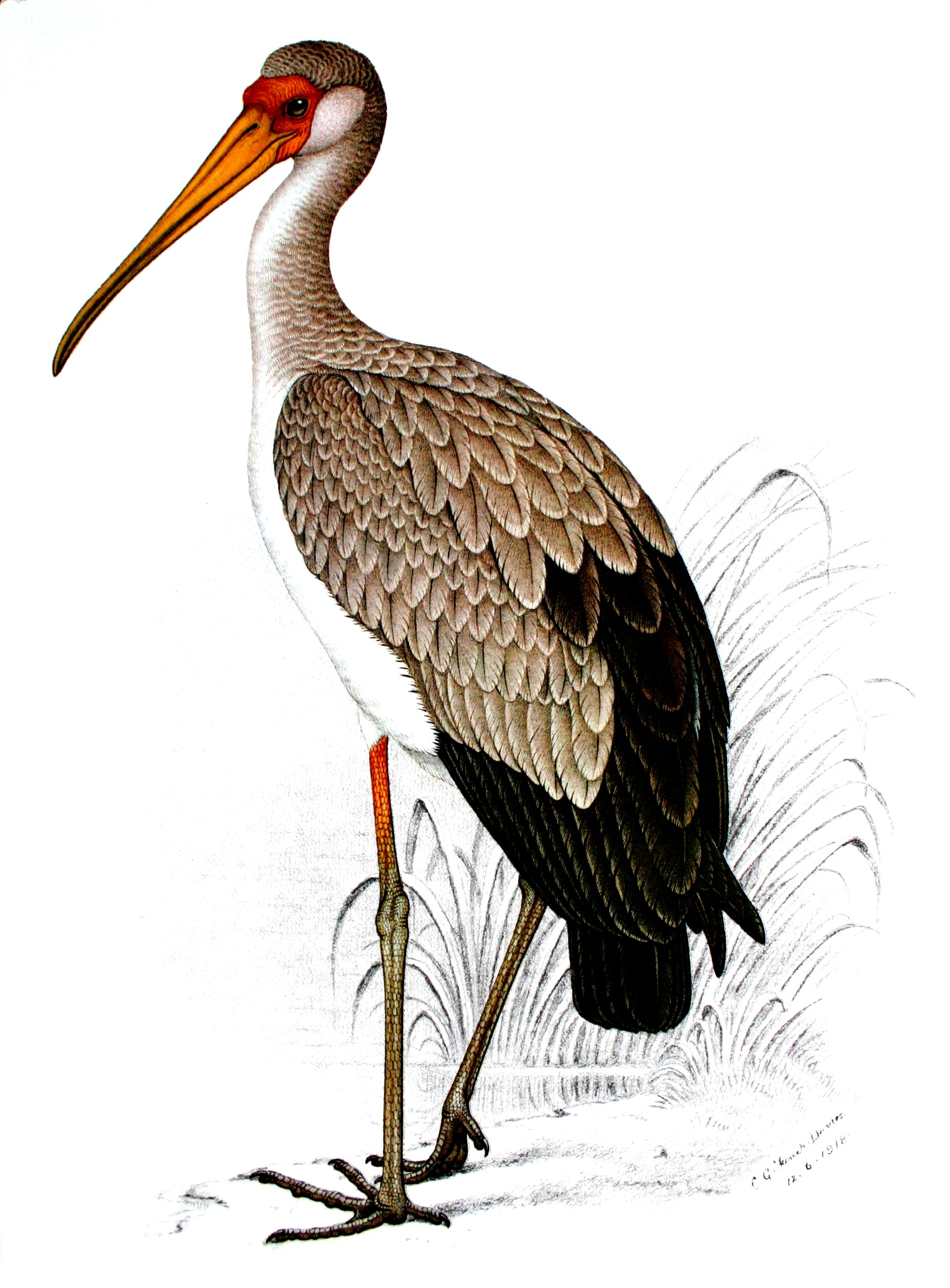
Yellow-billed stork – Mycteria ibis

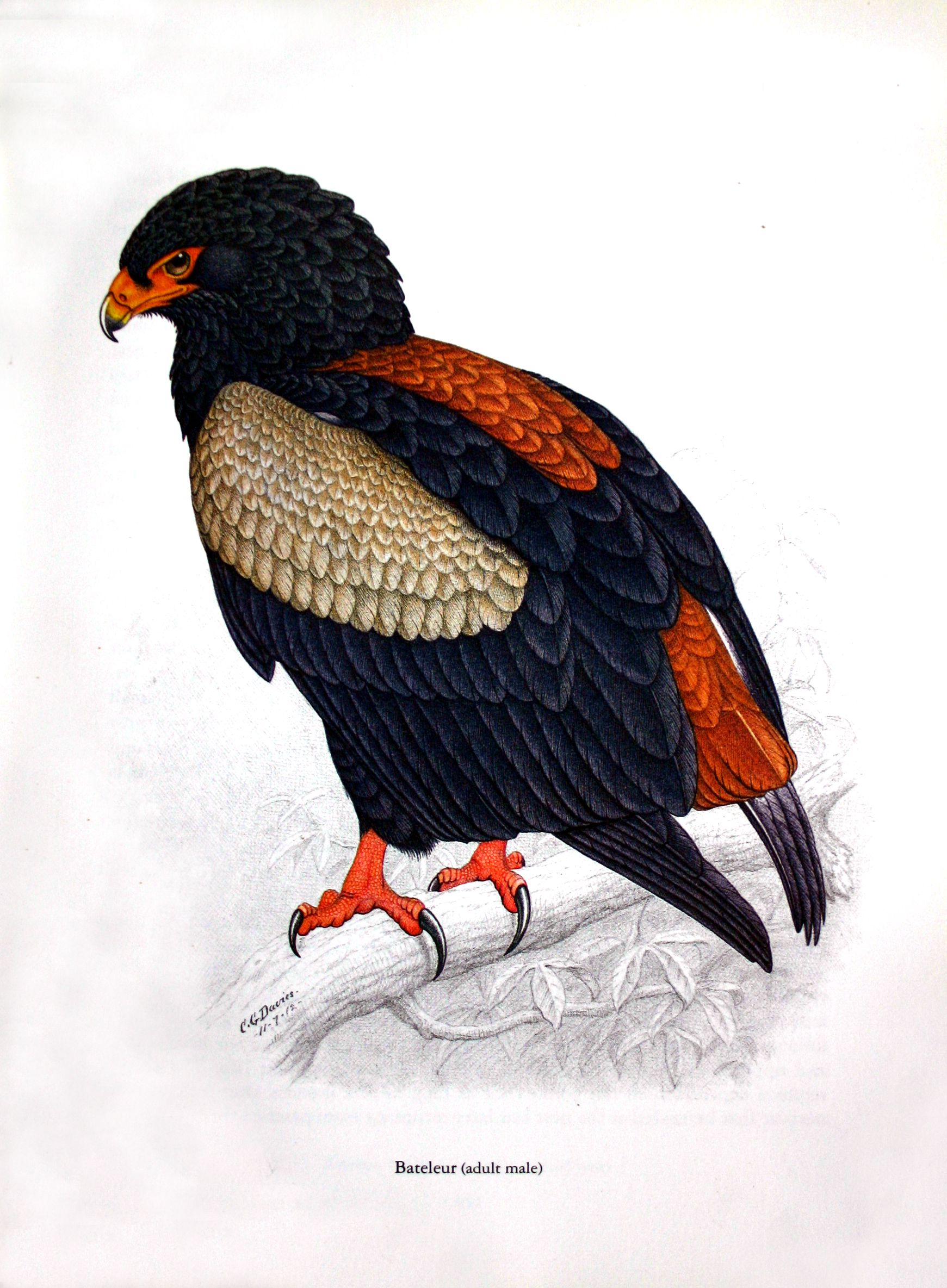
Terathopius ecaudatus Original plate by CG Finch-Davies

=== 1914–1920 ===
Davies' regiment was despatched to Port Nolloth near the southern border of German South-West Africa. After an initial skirmish, the regiment's orders were to patrol the border, part of which ran along the Kalahari Desert. Quite by chance, Davies could once more indulge in a population of bird species which were, for the greater part, new to him. By another stroke of good fortune his Medical Officer was Dr. Louis Clifford Thompson, a fellow birding enthusiast and the owner of a small library which Davies frequently consulted. During this period Davies started corresponding with Austin Roberts of the Transvaal Museum. The regiment returned fleetingly to the Orange River Colony to suppress a minor rebellion, after which they were ordered to Walvis Bay. On arrival Davies was promoted to lieutenant. The German troops surrendered on 1 July 1915. Shortly after the German surrender, Davies travelled to Cape Town for medical attention, returning to South West Africa early in 1916. It is more than likely that he met his future wife Aileen Singleton Finch, daughter of Captain W Finch, who was head of the Society for the Prevention of Cruelty to Animals, on the Cape Town visit, because he returned there and married Aileen on 4 August 1916. From that date on they were known as Finch-Davies.

By 1918 Finch-Davies was publishing papers on the birds of the towns of Okahandja and Outjo in what is now Namibia. He was still supplying specimens to the Transvaal Museum in exchange for access to their journals and preserved specimens, despite the difficulties due to his remote posting. The good news that his regiment was soon to return to South Africa, prompted him to take a month's leave so that he could visit Walvis Bay, to study the profusion of coastal birds there.

By early 1919 he was stationed at Roberts Heights just outside Pretoria. By now the couple had two children – a son and a recently born daughter. Despite Aileen's chagrin at his preoccupation with birds, Finch-Davies continued to put in long hours at the Transvaal Museum library. In January 1920 the Museum found that Finch-Davies had removed some 230 plates from reference books which he had consulted. In May 1920 Breijer, director of the Transvaal Museum, received a letter from Louis Péringuey, director of the South African Museum in Cape Town, in which he disclosed that some 130 plates were missing from their reference books. Despite the Museum's not preferring charges, the incident became public knowledge. Finch-Davies' paintings were held as security by the Museum until such time as he could pay for the replacement of the damaged books. Even though his actions were considered impulsive and that his judgement had been clouded by his obsession with illustrating birds, the damage done to his reputation was irreparable. Finch-Davies was transferred to Cape Town where Aileen, who had produced a second son in June 1920, joined him. It was evident to all who knew him, that Finch-Davies was suffering severe emotional distress. On the morning of 4 August 1920 he was found dead in his bed by his orderly. The cause of his death was recorded as angina pectoris. He was accorded a military funeral and interred at Maitland Cemetery in Cape Town.

Austin Roberts edited Roberts Birds of South Africa in 1940 and Our South African Birds in 1941, and it is readily apparent that the illustrations in these books are copies of the Finch-Davies plates held by the Transvaal Museum.

== Books ==
- Roberts Birds of South Africa (1940) – Austin Roberts (editor); uncredited use of plates by Finch-Davies
- Our South African Birds (1941) – Austin Roberts (editor); uncredited use of plates by Finch-Davies
- The Paintings of Norman Lighton for Roberts Birds of South Africa – A. V. Bird (editor); 'Lighton acknowledges influence of Finch-Davies', otherwise uncredited use of plates by Finch-Davies
- Gamebirds and Waterfowl of South Africa – Major Boyd Horsbrugh & Claude Gibney Davies (Winchester Press, Johannesburg 1978) ISBN 0-620-03017-8
- The Birds of Prey of Southern Africa – C.G. Finch-Davies and Dr.A.C. Kemp (Winchester Press, Johannesburg 1980) ISBN 0-620-04578-7
- The Birds Paintings of C.G. Finch-Davies – Introduction by Dr.A.C. Kemp (Winchester Press, Johannesburg 1984) ISBN 0-620-07459-0
- A Celebration of Birds (Natural History Books, Johannesburg 1990) ISBN 0-620-14819-5
