= Boyd Robert Horsbrugh =

British ornithologist and soldier (1871–1916)

Lieutenant-Colonel Boyd Robert Horsbrugh
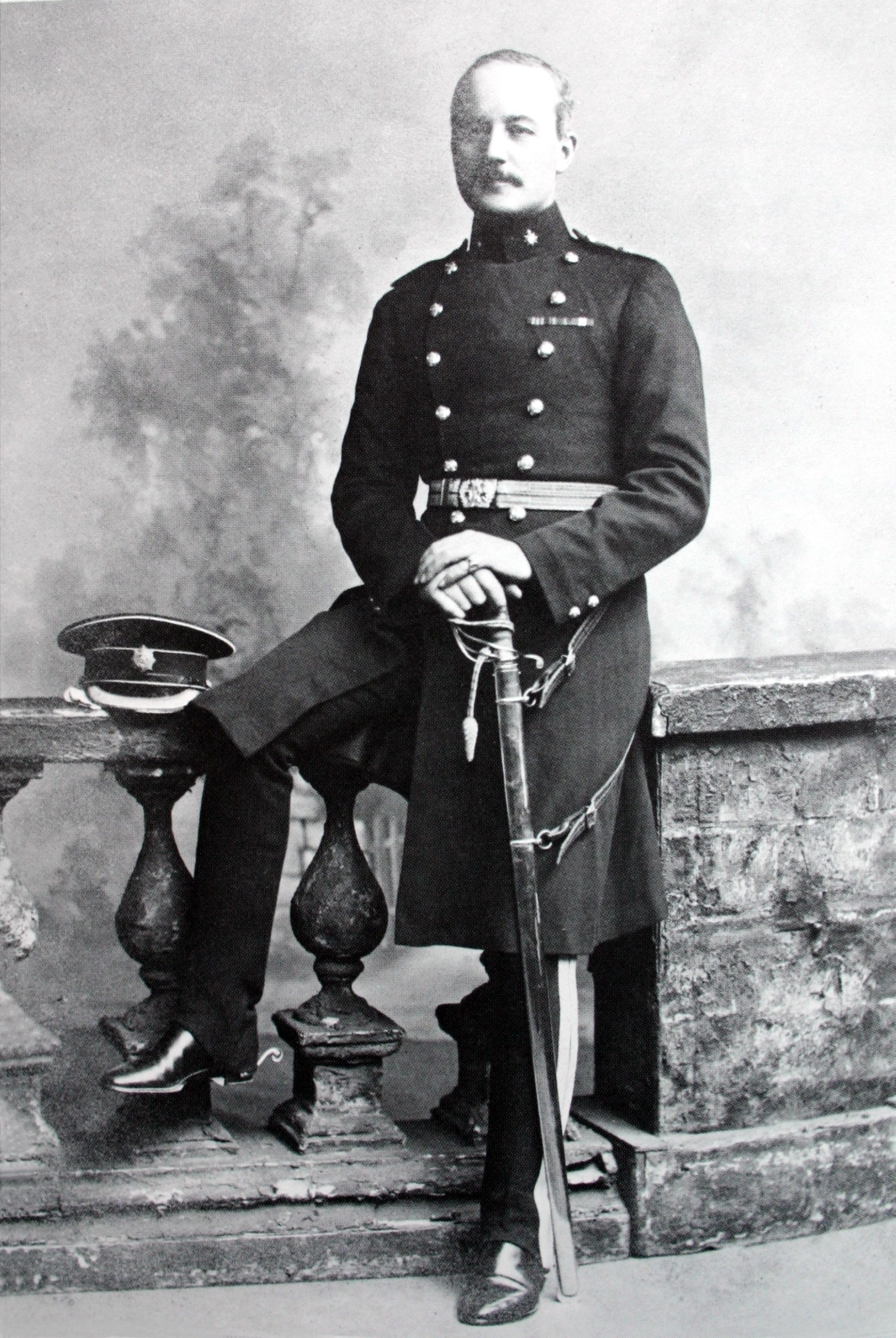
- Born: 27 July 1871; Poona, India
- Died: 11 July 1916 (aged 44); England
- Military career
- Allegiance: United Kingdom
- Branch: British Army
- Rank: Lieutenant-Colonel
- Units: Royal Warwickshire Regiment; Army Service Corps; The Scottish Horse
- Conflicts: Bai Bureh rebellion in Sierra Leone; Second Boer War
- Awards: Protectorate Expedition Medal; Queen's Medal; King's Medal
- Other work: Ornithologist

Boyd Robert Horsbrugh (27 July 1871 – 11 July 1916) was an English ornithologist and military man, best known for his 1912 book The Gamebirds and Waterfowl of South Africa, a collaborative work with Claude Gibney Finch-Davies.

== Early life ==
He was born the elder son of Charles Bell Horsbrugh, a captain and Adjutant of the 2nd Central India Horse. At an early age he was sent to England, attending Wellington College and the Royal Military College at Sandhurst.

== Military service ==
On 25 February 1893 he joined the Royal Warwickshire Regiment, serving in Ceylon with them for two years. He was transferred to the Army Service Corps in 1895 and was posted to Ireland where he was promoted to Lieutenant in 1896. He Saw service in Sierra Leone in 1898-99 taking part in the suppression of the Bai Bureh rebellion. He Awarded the Protectorate Expedition Medal with Clasp. In 1899 he took part in the Anglo Boer War in South Africa (1899- 1902) He was wounded and invalided to England in 1902. He was Awarded the Queen's Medal and the Kings Medal with 5 clasps to his medal. Promoted to Major in 1908. Retired 1912 to live in Oxted. Called up in 1914 to serve with the Army Service Corps. AsTempoary Lt Col in August 1915 he went to the front commanding a Divisional Train. He was Present at the Battle of Loos and received a Mention in Dispatches. Invalided home to Oxted and he died the following year after an operation 11 July 1916 aged 44. He is buried in St Peter's Church Tandridge

== Sierra Leone ==
Horsbrugh was stationed in Sierra Leone from 1898 to 1899 and saw service during the Bai Bureh rebellion. For his services during this operation, he was awarded the Protectorate Expedition Medal with clasp.

While stationed in Sierra Leone he became a lifelong member of the Avicultural Society of Great Britain, occasionally contributing articles to their journal. A local chief brought him birds to study, one of which was a hornbill that became a valued pet until killed by another pet - a large-spotted genet (Genetta tigrina). He also raised two grey parrots that became his constant companions and learnt to talk, as well as a turaco that regularly shared an early morning bath with him. Horsbrugh had an undoubted skill with and an understanding of wild birds.

== Boer War ==
1899 saw him back in England for only a short while before being drafted to South Africa to take part in the Boer War. He served mainly with Lord Methuen and was promoted to Captain on 1 April 1900.

In May of that same year he came under fire from the Boer forces while fording the Rhenoster River. He was among the troops that relieved the town of Lindley and the 13th Yeomanry Battalion on 27 June 1900. For the next two years he was moved all over the country in a seemingly endless war. His duties took up much of his time and energy, so that he published no bird articles during this period.

Just before the end of the war, he was invalided back to England, arriving on the hospital ship Nubia in March 1902. For his services he received the Queen's Medal with three clasps and the King's Medal with two clasps.

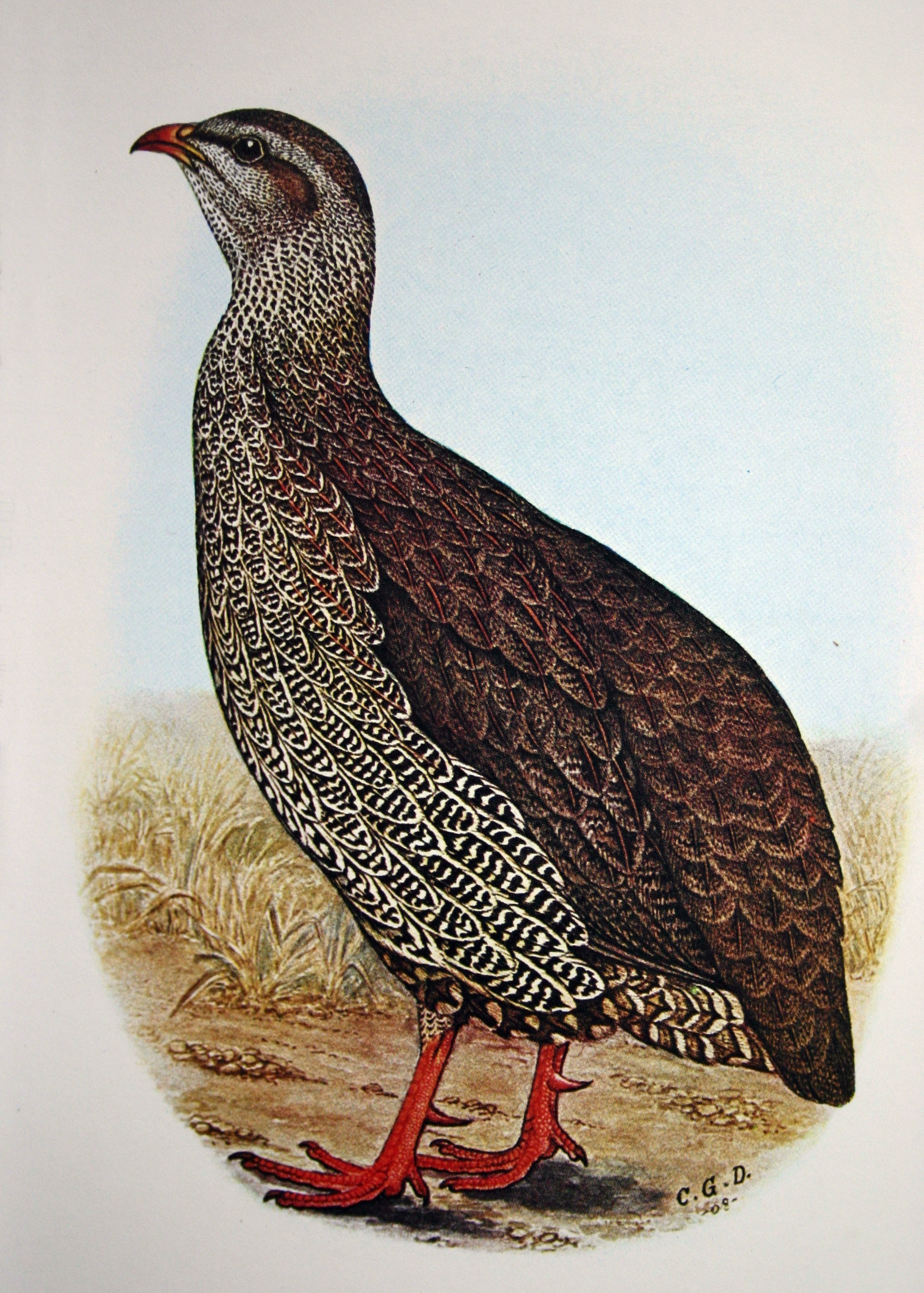
Francolinus natalensis by Claude Gibney Finch-Davies from The Gamebirds and Waterfowl of South Africa

== Tour of the United States ==
As part of his convalescence in 1902, Horsbrugh embarked on an extensive tour of the United States. He devoted a large amount of time to studying particularly gamebirds and waterfowl in their natural habitat. During his tour he met, courted and married Elizabeth Mitchell of Philadelphia. She was to prove a steadfast partner who shared a lasting interest in birds.

== Return to South Africa ==
After a stay of two years in Kent, Horsbrugh was again sent to South Africa in 1905 to enforce the imperial peace. He was posted to Bloemfontein, where he and his wife were allocated an officer's house on top of Naval Hill. It was an idyllic location, teeming with birds. Horsbrugh built some large aviaries in the garden so as to acquire first-hand knowledge of their breeding and habits.

In June 1905 his younger brother, C. B. Horsbrugh (1874–1952), joined them on Naval Hill, but soon took up employment with the Transvaal Museum in Pretoria under Dr. J. W. B. Gunning. Besides hunting together, the two brothers often made trips into the veld to study birds in their natural habitat.

== Return to England ==
The Horsbrughs left for England in July 1906 on four months' leave, and took along a large number of live birds. On the train trip from Bloemfontein to Cape Town, Boyd Horsbrugh travelled in the guard's van to ensure the proper feeding and care of his charges.

When C. B. Horsbrugh returned to England in 1907, he also took along a considerable collection of live South African birds, causing great excitement in the avicultural world.
