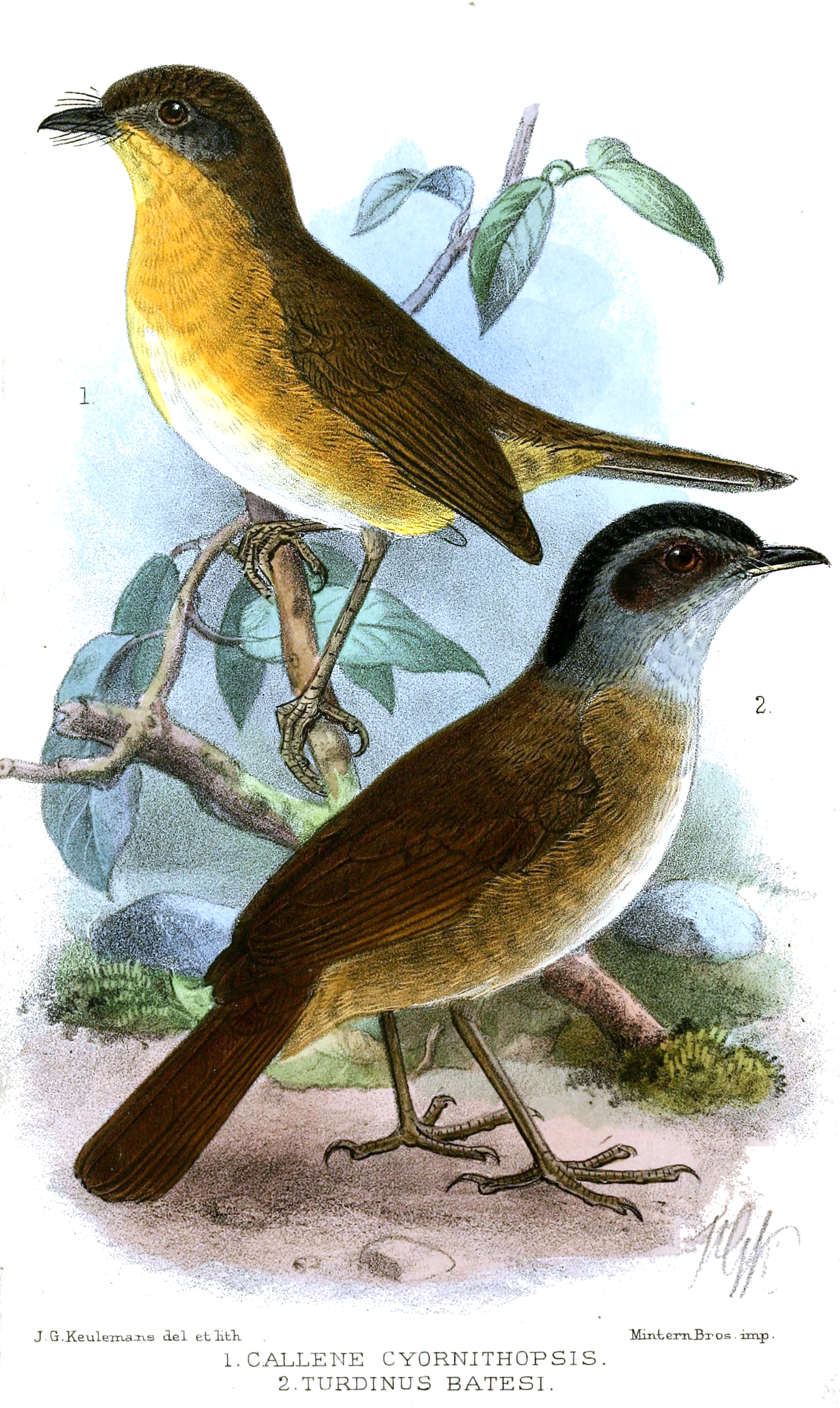

Scientific classification
- Kingdom: Animalia
- Phylum: Chordata
- Class: Aves
- Order: Passeriformes
- Family: Muscicapidae
- Genus: Sheppardia; Haagner, 1909

Type species
- Sheppardia gunningi Haagner, 1909

Species
- See text.

= Akalat =

Akalats

Genus of birds

The akalats (stressed on the second syllable) are medium-sized insectivorous birds in the genus Sheppardia. They were formerly placed in the thrush family, Turdidae, but are more often now treated as part of the Old World flycatcher family, Muscicapidae.

The genus contains 11 Sub-Saharan forest-dwelling species:

Image	Common name	Scientific name	Distribution
-	Usambara akalat	Sheppardia montana	Usambara Mountains
-	Iringa akalat	Sheppardia lowei	Eastern Arc forests
-	Rubeho akalat	Sheppardia aurantiithorax	Rubeho Mountains
-	East coast akalat	Sheppardia gunningi	Nguu Mountains and eastern Afromontane
-	Sharpe's akalat	Sheppardia sharpei	Eastern Arc forests and northern Malawi
-	Bocage's akalat	Sheppardia bocagei	miombo region
-	Short-tailed akalat	Sheppardia poensis	Western High Plateau and Albertine Rift montane forests
-	Lowland akalat	Sheppardia cyornithopsis	African tropical rainforest
	Equatorial akalat	Sheppardia aequatorialis	eastern Afromontane
	Gabela akalat	Sheppardia gabela	western Angola
	Grey-winged robin-chat	Sheppardia polioptera	Sub-Saharan Africa (rare in eastern and southern Africa)

== Taxonomy and etymology ==
The genus Sheppardia was introduced in 1909 by the South African ornithologist Alwin Karl Haagner with the East coast akalat (Sheppardia gunningi) as the type species. The name of the genus was chosen to honour the collector and farmer P. A. Sheppard.

Richard Bowdler Sharpe, who had never visited Africa, associated the akalats, in their Bulu appellation, with birds of "different kinds" occurring in the forest understorey. His main collector in West Africa, George L. Bates, denoted them more specifically as "little members of the genus Turdinus, which are called in Fang and Bulu "Akalat"....". The latter genus denoted a group of Old World babblers, currently classed as near-babblers in the genus Illadopsis.

David Armitage Bannerman's volumes on West African birds, published from 1930 through to 1951, became well-established reference works for the region, and retained the name akalat for Trichastoma, which is Illadopsis. Reichenow however classed Turdinus batesi as an Alethe, then in the Turdidae (thrushes and flycatchers), followed by Jackson and Sclater in 1938 who applied it to Sheppardia specifically. Mackworth-Praed and Grant (1953, 1955) and Williams (1963 - 1980s) retained their usage. In 1964 the name was still recorded as denoting both groups, namely the Malococincla, i.e. Illadopsis near-babblers in West Africa, and the Sheppardia chats in East African literature, though the latter convention prevailed in modern times.

Yet the calls of the aforementioned species only doubtfully agree with the akalat's appellation as an omen of death. It is recorded that the akalat's forest song, respectively referred to as "boofio" and "woofio" by the Bulu and Ntumu peoples, is believed by them to predict the death of a near parent who bids them farewell with this song.
