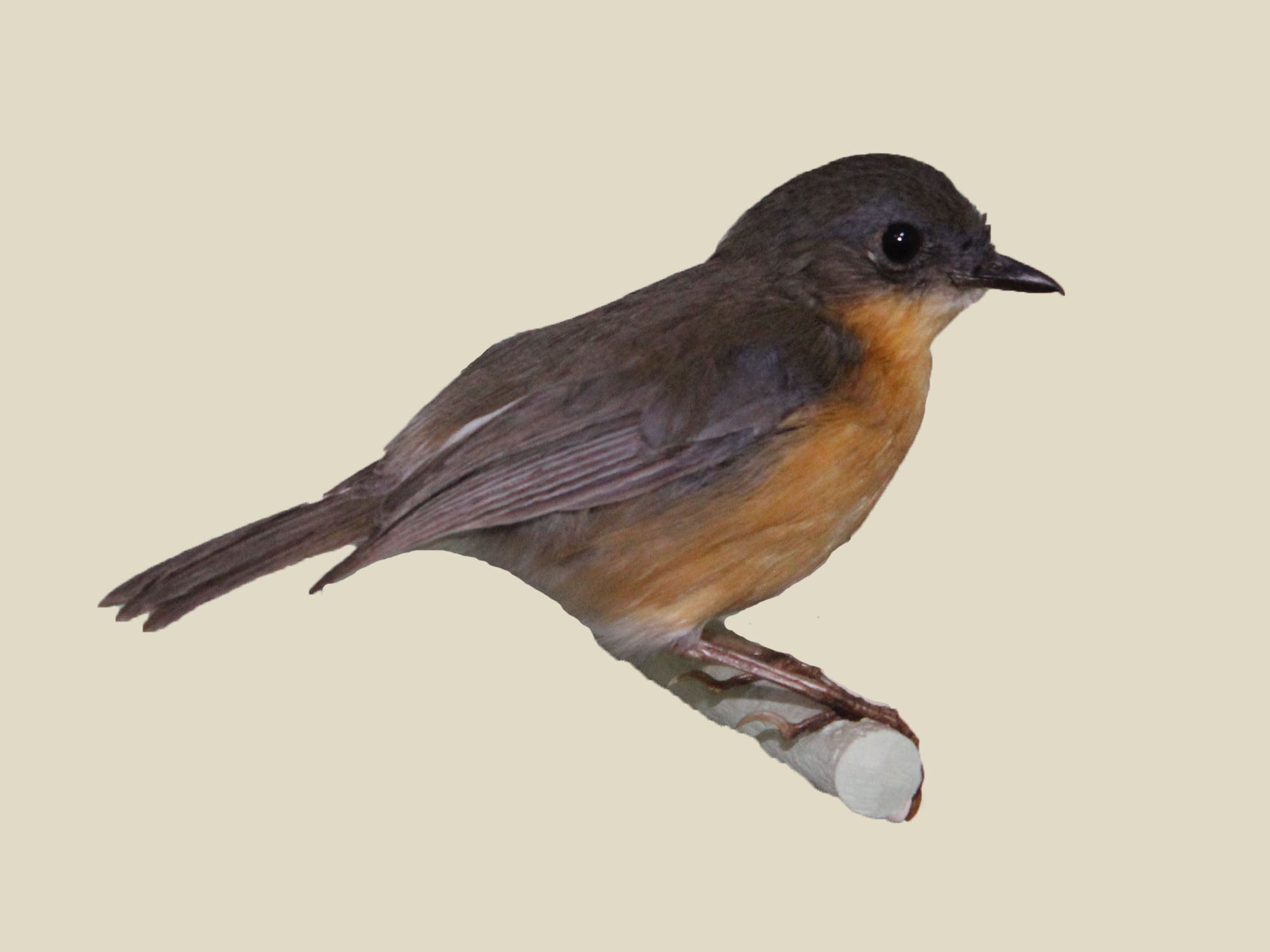
- Specimen at Nairobi National Museum

Conservation status
- Near Threatened (IUCN 3.1)

Scientific classification
- Kingdom: Animalia
- Phylum: Chordata
- Class: Aves
- Order: Passeriformes
- Family: Muscicapidae
- Genus: Sheppardia
- Species: S. gunningi

Binomial name
- Sheppardia gunningi Haagner, 1909

= East coast akalat =

Species of bird

The east coast akalat or Gunning's robin (Sheppardia gunningi) is a small passerine bird which can be found in the east of Africa from Kenya to Mozambique, and is named after J. W. B. Gunning.

This species is a forest-dwelling insectivorous bird related to the small Old World flycatchers commonly known as chats; like these, it was formerly placed with the thrushes (Turdidae).

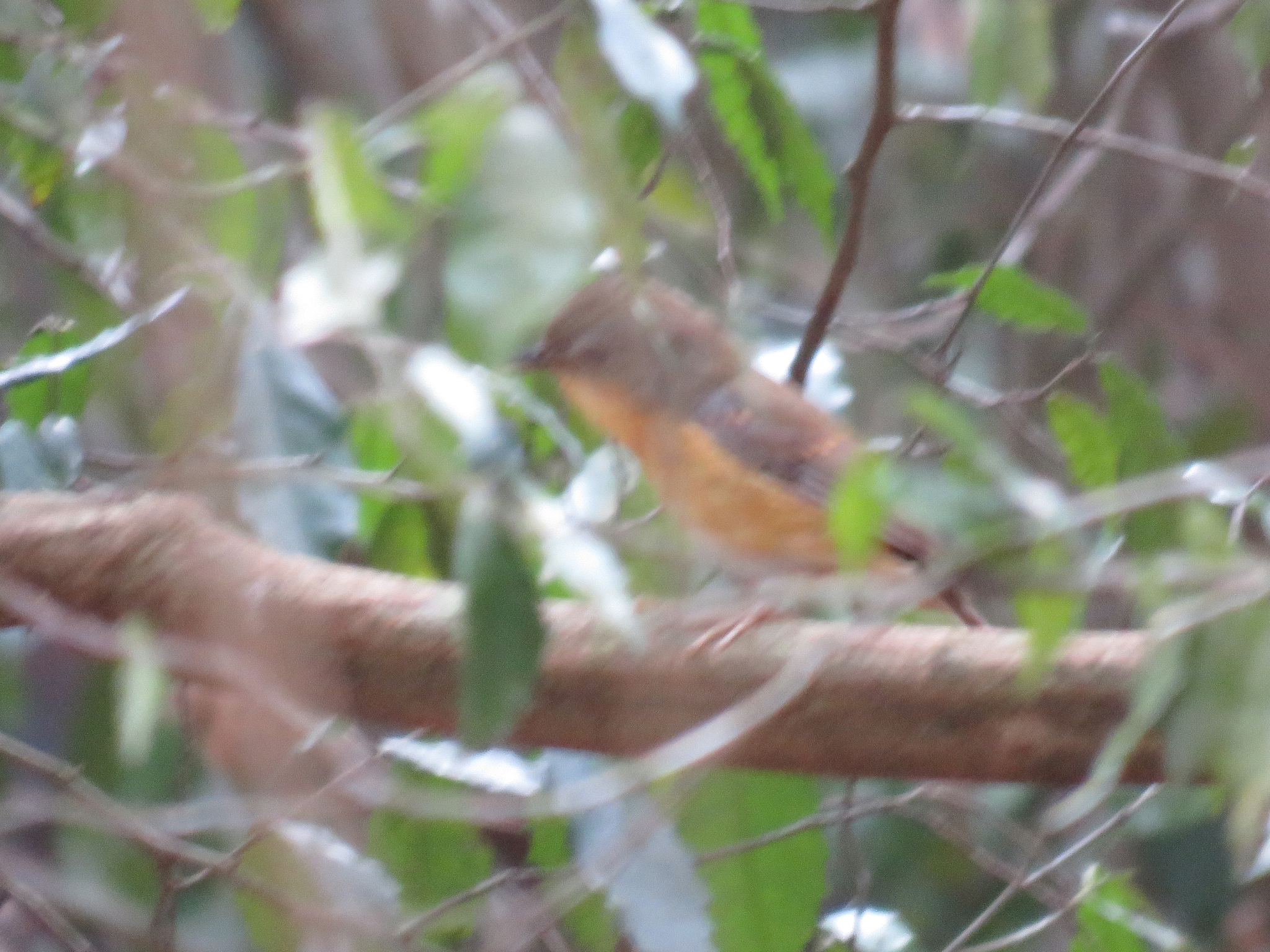
Live bird in Mozambique

The east coast akalat is affected by habitat loss. Having turned out to be more common than previously believed, it is downlisted from Vulnerable to Near Threatened in the 2007 IUCN Red List.
