= Thomas Ayres =

Thomas Ayres may refer to:

- Thomas Ayres (ornithologist) (1828–1913), British-born South African ornithologist
- Thomas Ayres (artist) (1816–1858), California gold rush-era artist
- Thomas E. Ayres (born 1962), American military lawyer
