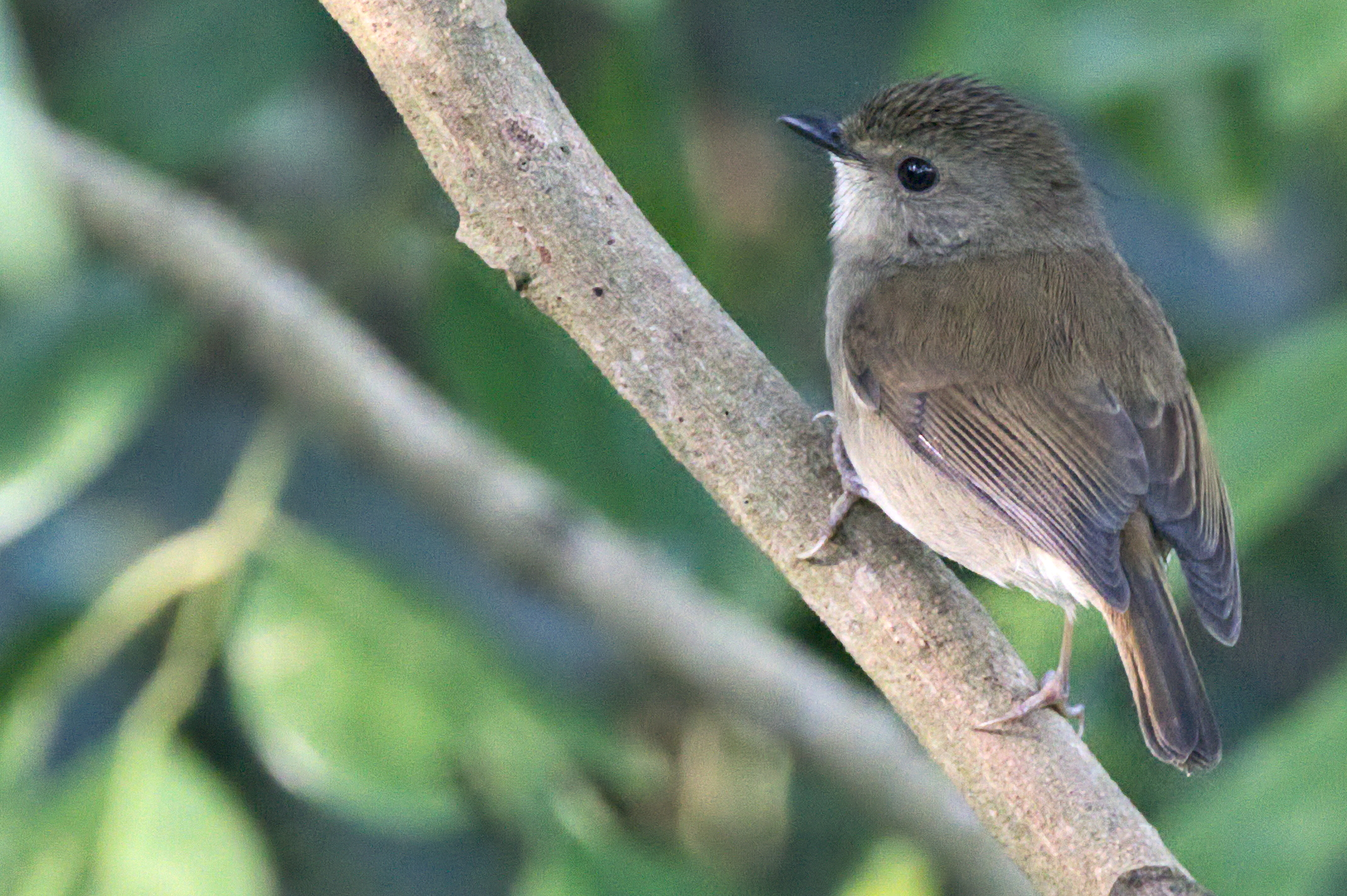

Conservation status
- Endangered (IUCN 3.1)

Scientific classification
- Kingdom: Animalia
- Phylum: Chordata
- Class: Aves
- Order: Passeriformes
- Family: Muscicapidae
- Genus: Sheppardia
- Species: S. gabela

Binomial name
- Sheppardia gabela (Rand, 1957)

= Gabela akalat =

Species of bird

The Gabela akalat (Sheppardia gabela) is a species of bird in the family Muscicapidae. It is endemic to Angola. The name is in part derived from the town where they were first observed, Gabela.

Its natural habitat is subtropical or tropical moist montane forests. It is threatened by habitat loss.
