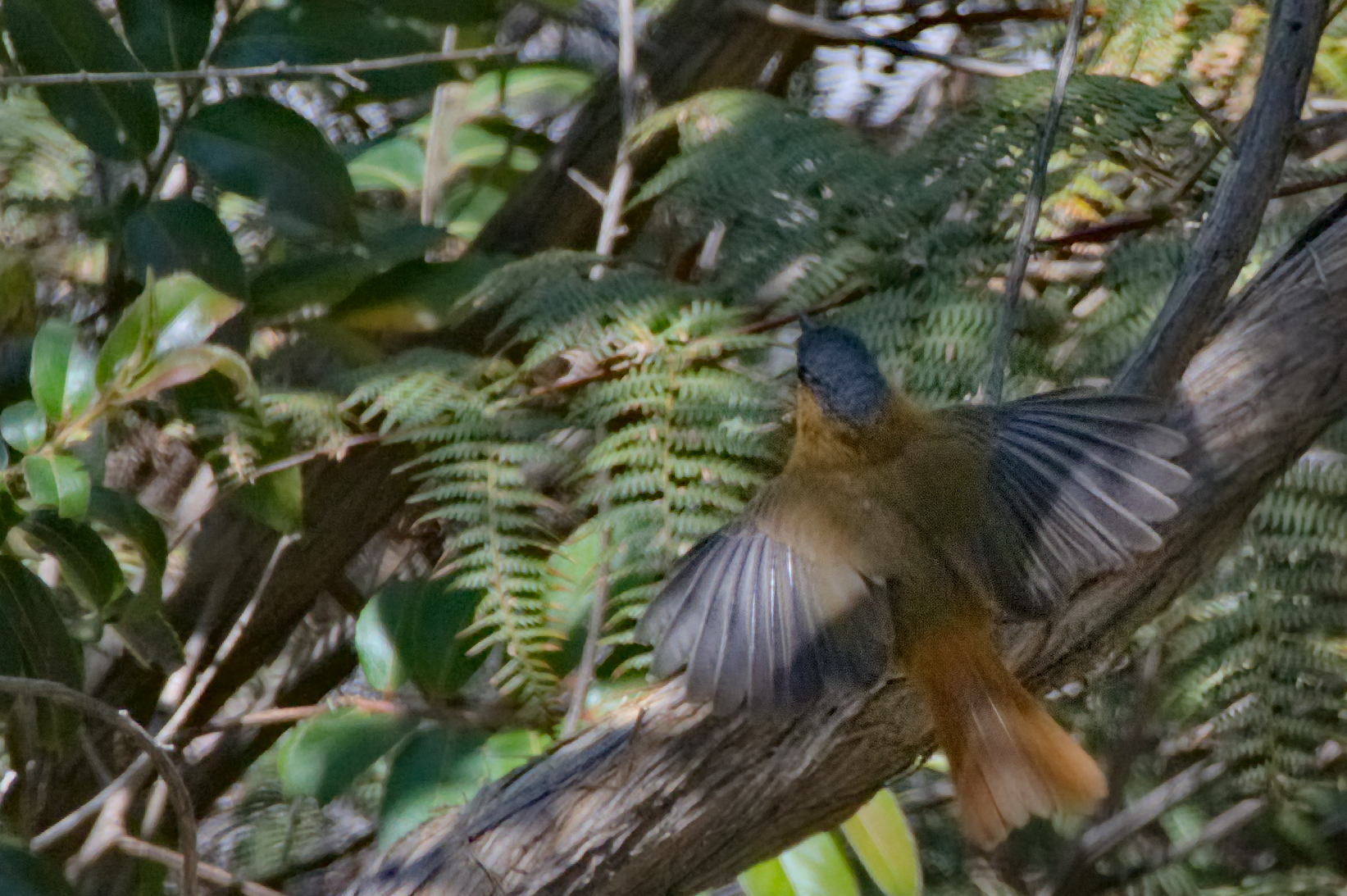

Conservation status
- Least Concern (IUCN 3.1)

Scientific classification
- Kingdom: Animalia
- Phylum: Chordata
- Class: Aves
- Order: Passeriformes
- Family: Muscicapidae
- Genus: Sheppardia
- Species: S. bocagei

Binomial name
- Sheppardia bocagei (Finsch & Hartlaub, 1870)

= Bocage's akalat =

Species of bird

Bocage's akalat (Sheppardia bocagei) is a species of bird in the family Muscicapidae. It is found in Angola, Cameroon, Democratic Republic of the Congo, Equatorial Guinea, Nigeria, Tanzania, and Zambia. Its natural habitats are boreal forests, subtropical or tropical dry forests, subtropical or tropical swamps, and subtropical or tropical moist montane forests.

The common name and Latin binomial commemorate the Portuguese naturalist José Vicente Barbosa du Bocage.

The short-tailed akalat (S. poensis) or Alexander's akalat was formerly considered conspecific, but was split as a distinct species by the IOC in 2021. This species' name commemorates Boyd Alexander, an English ornithologist.
