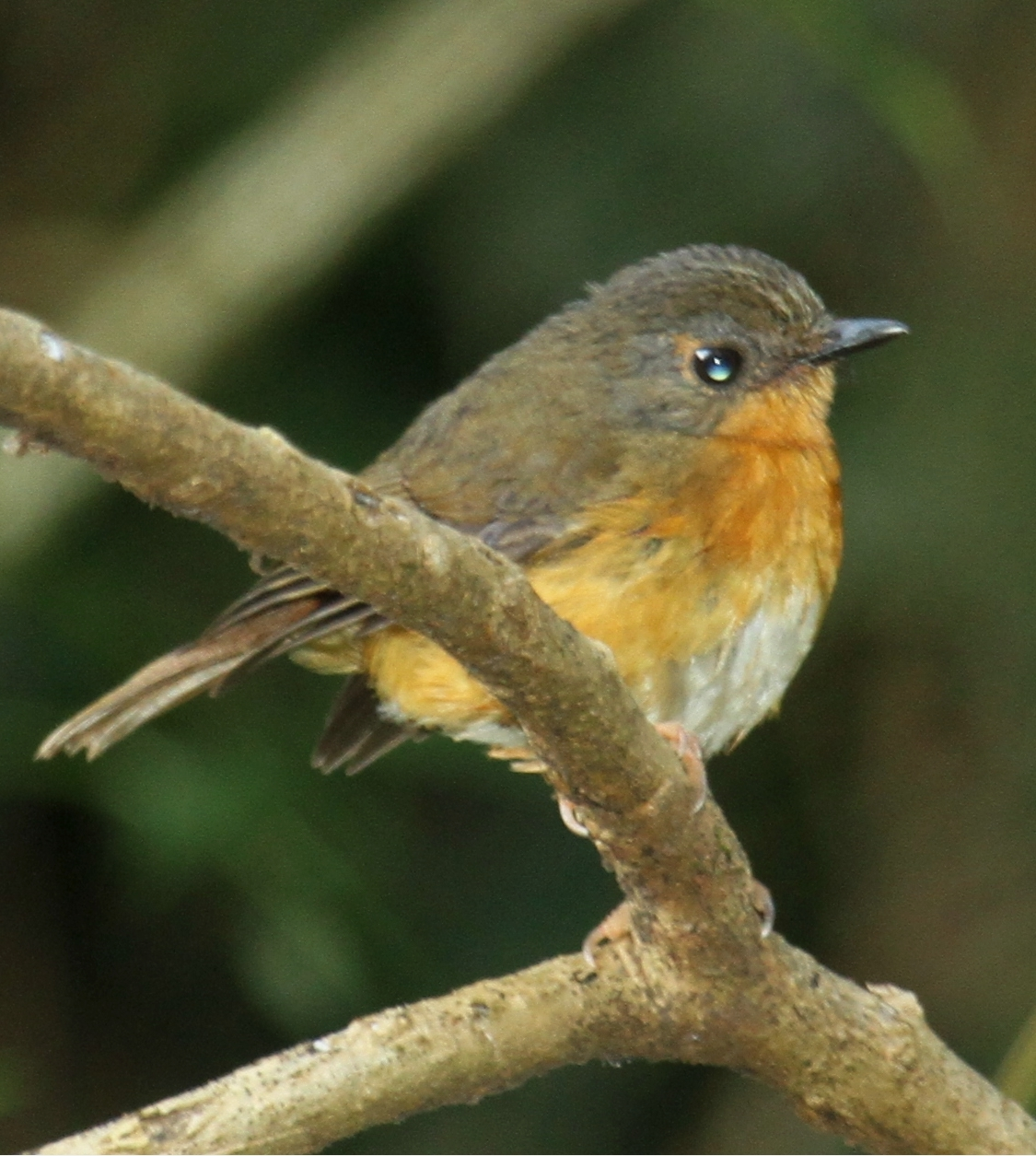

Conservation status
- Least Concern (IUCN 3.1)

Scientific classification
- Kingdom: Animalia
- Phylum: Chordata
- Class: Aves
- Order: Passeriformes
- Family: Muscicapidae
- Genus: Sheppardia
- Species: S. aequatorialis

Binomial name
- Sheppardia aequatorialis (Jackson, 1906)

= Equatorial akalat =

Species of bird

The equatorial akalat (Sheppardia aequatorialis) is a species of bird in the family Muscicapidae. Its natural habitat is subtropical or tropical moist montane forests.

== Subspecies ==
- S. a. acholiensis : Imatong Mountains
- S. a. aequatorialis : eastern DRC, southern Uganda, Rwanda, Burundi and western Kenya.
