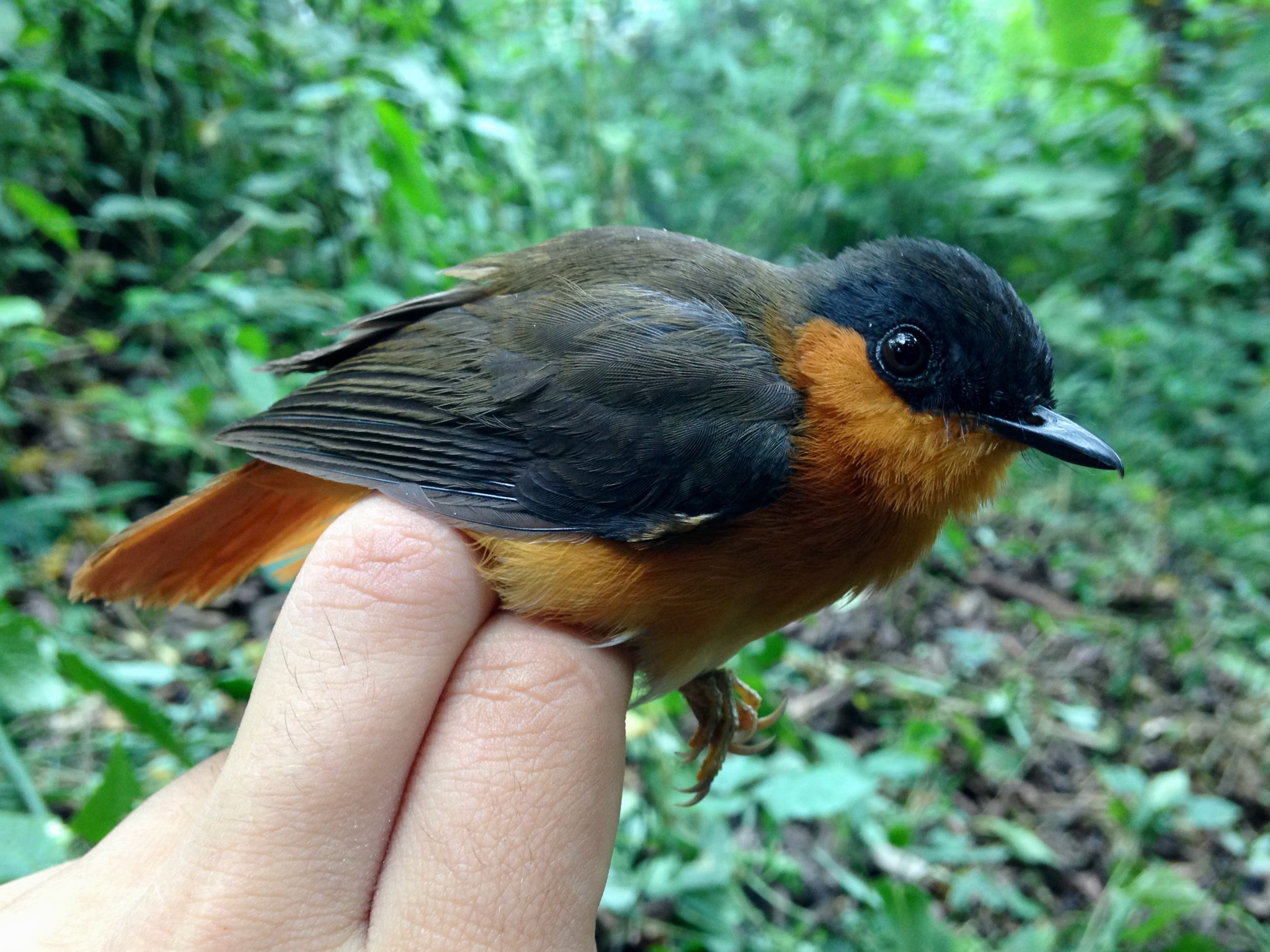

Conservation status
- Least Concern (IUCN 3.1)

Scientific classification
- Kingdom: Animalia
- Phylum: Chordata
- Class: Aves
- Order: Passeriformes
- Family: Muscicapidae
- Genus: Sheppardia
- Species: S. poensis

Binomial name
- Sheppardia poensis (Alexander, 1903)

= Short-tailed akalat =

Species of bird

The short-tailed akalat (Sheppardia poensis) is a species of bird in the family Muscicapidae. It has a scattered range throughout Central Africa. Its natural habitats are boreal forests, subtropical or tropical dry forests, subtropical or tropical swamps, and subtropical or tropical moist montane forests.

The short-tailed akalat was formerly considered conspecific to Bocage's akalat (Sheppardia bocagei), but was split as a distinct species by the IOC in 2021.
