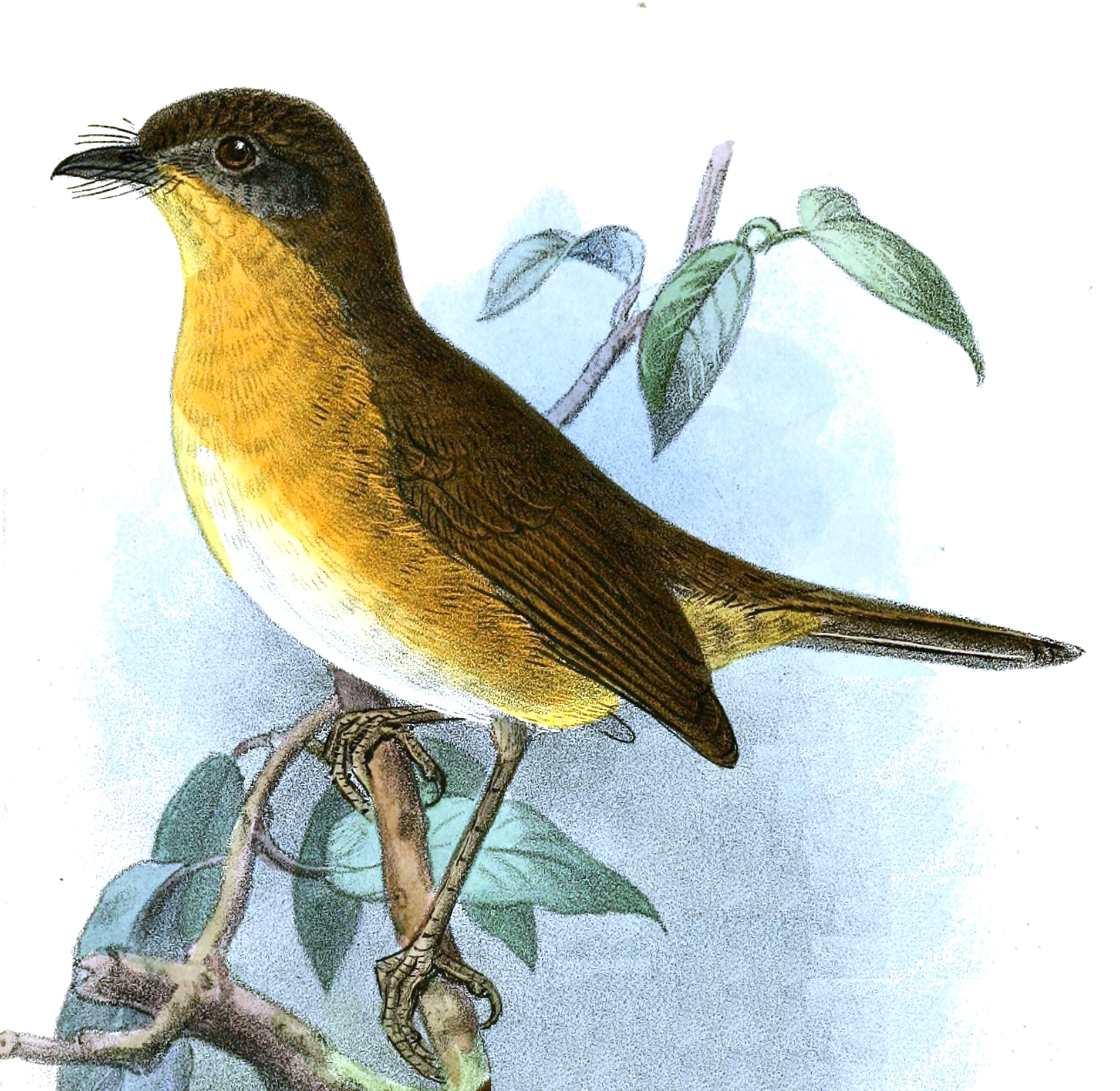

Conservation status
- Least Concern (IUCN 3.1)

Scientific classification
- Kingdom: Animalia
- Phylum: Chordata
- Class: Aves
- Order: Passeriformes
- Family: Muscicapidae
- Genus: Sheppardia
- Species: S. cyornithopsis

Binomial name
- Sheppardia cyornithopsis (Sharpe, 1901)

= Lowland akalat =

Species of bird

The lowland akalat (Sheppardia cyornithopsis) is a species of bird in the family Muscicapidae. Its disjunct range extends across the African tropical rainforest. Its natural habitats are subtropical or tropical dry forest and subtropical or tropical moist lowland forest.
