= Our South African Birds =

1941 album of birds by Austin Roberts

Our South African Birds, Ons Suid-Afrikaanse Voëls
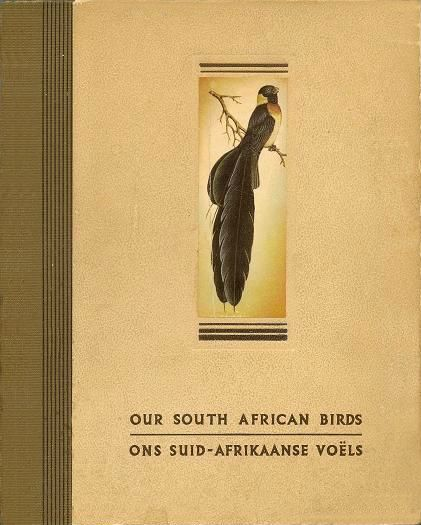
- Book cover
- Author: Austin Roberts (editor)
- Illustrator: Norman Lighton, Claude Gibney Finch-Davies
- Language: English, Afrikaans
- Subject: Ornithology
- Publisher: Cape Times
- Publication date: 1941
- Publication place: South Africa
- Pages: 106

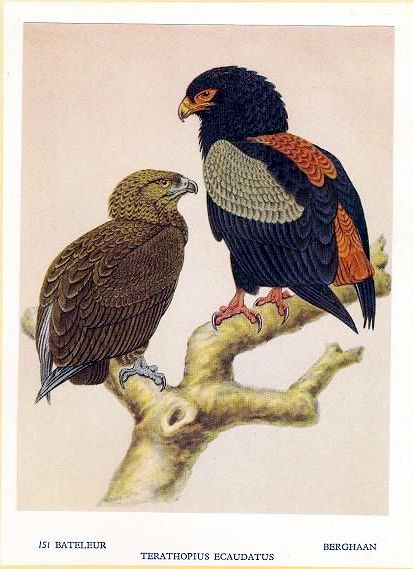
Pair of bateleurs from the book

Our South African Birds is an album of South African birds published in 1941. Printed in English and Afrikaans, it was issued with spaces for 150 cigarette cards distributed by a consortium of tobacco companies.

A foreword was written by John Voelcker, then president of the South African Ornithological Society, and the album was edited by Austin Roberts. The illustrations were attributed to Norman Lighton although they were clearly copies of the Claude Gibney Finch-Davies plates held by the Transvaal Museum - Finch-Davies was neither credited nor mentioned as he had fallen from grace in the eyes of the Transvaal Museum. The album of 106 pages appeared in quarto size in cream boards and brown cloth spine, with a colour illustration of a broad-tailed paradise-whydah pasted on the front board.

A companion volume titled Our South African Flora was published at the same time and was edited by Robert Harold Compton, director of the Kirstenbosch National Botanical Garden in Cape Town. The printing and design of both albums was done by Cape Times Limited of Cape Town.
