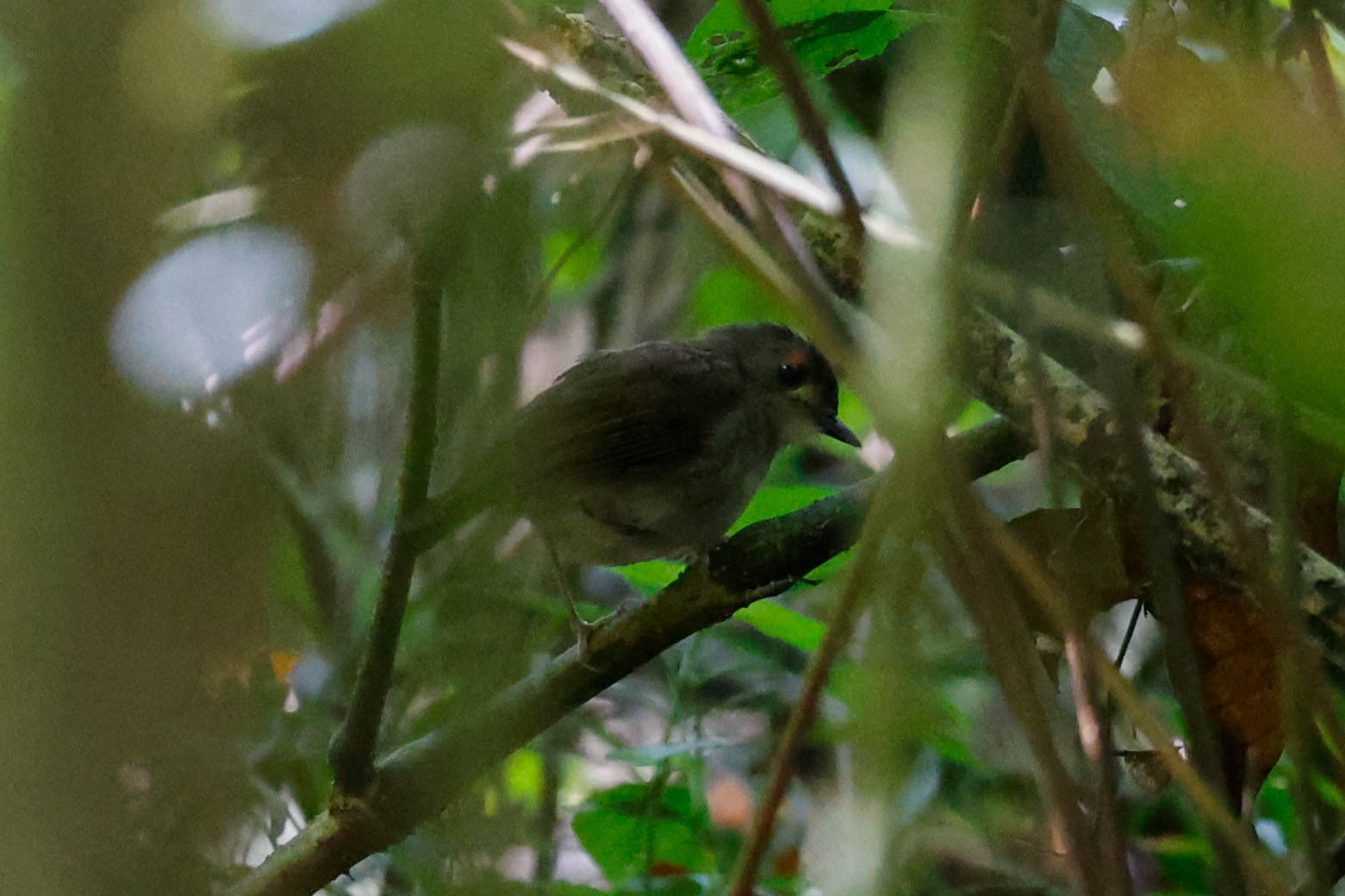

Conservation status
- Endangered (IUCN 3.1)

Scientific classification
- Kingdom: Animalia
- Phylum: Chordata
- Class: Aves
- Order: Passeriformes
- Family: Muscicapidae
- Genus: Sheppardia
- Species: S. montana

Binomial name
- Sheppardia montana (Reichenow, 1907)

= Usambara akalat =

Species of bird

The Usambara akalat (Sheppardia montana), also known as the Usambara alethe or Usambara robin-chat, is a species of bird in the family Muscicapidae. It is endemic to the Usambara Mountains in Tanga Region of Tanzania.

Its natural habitat is subtropical or tropical moist montane forests. It is threatened by habitat loss.
