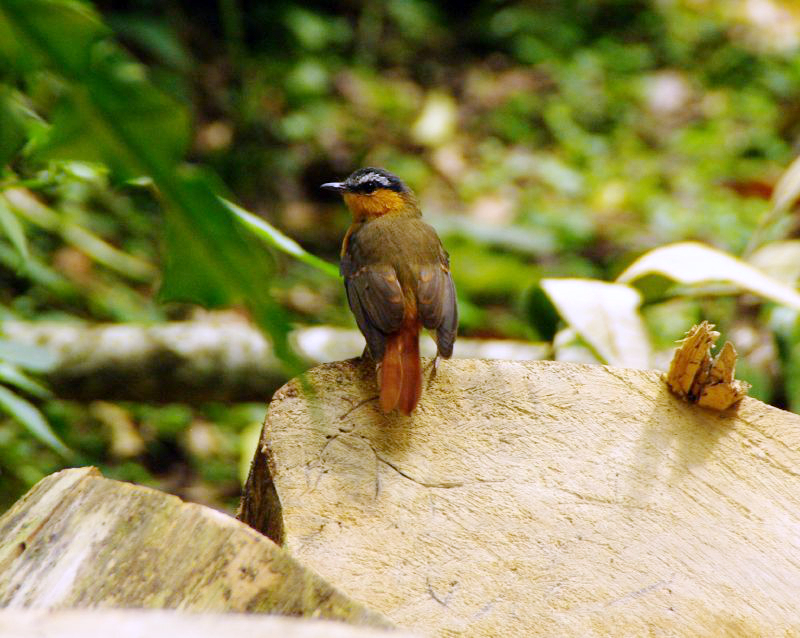

Conservation status
- Least Concern (IUCN 3.1)

Scientific classification
- Kingdom: Animalia
- Phylum: Chordata
- Class: Aves
- Order: Passeriformes
- Family: Muscicapidae
- Genus: Sheppardia
- Species: S. polioptera

Binomial name
- Sheppardia polioptera (Reichenow, 1892)

Synonyms
- Cossypha polioptera

= Grey-winged robin-chat =

Species of bird

The grey-winged robin-chat or grey-winged akalat (Sheppardia polioptera) is a bird in the family Muscicapidae. The species was first described by Anton Reichenow in 1892.

It is found in Angola, Burundi, Cameroon, the Central African Republic, the Democratic Republic of the Congo, Ivory Coast, Guinea, Kenya, Liberia, Nigeria, Rwanda, Sierra Leone, South Sudan, Tanzania, Uganda, and Zambia. Its natural habitats are subtropical or tropical moist lowland forest and subtropical or tropical moist montane forest.
