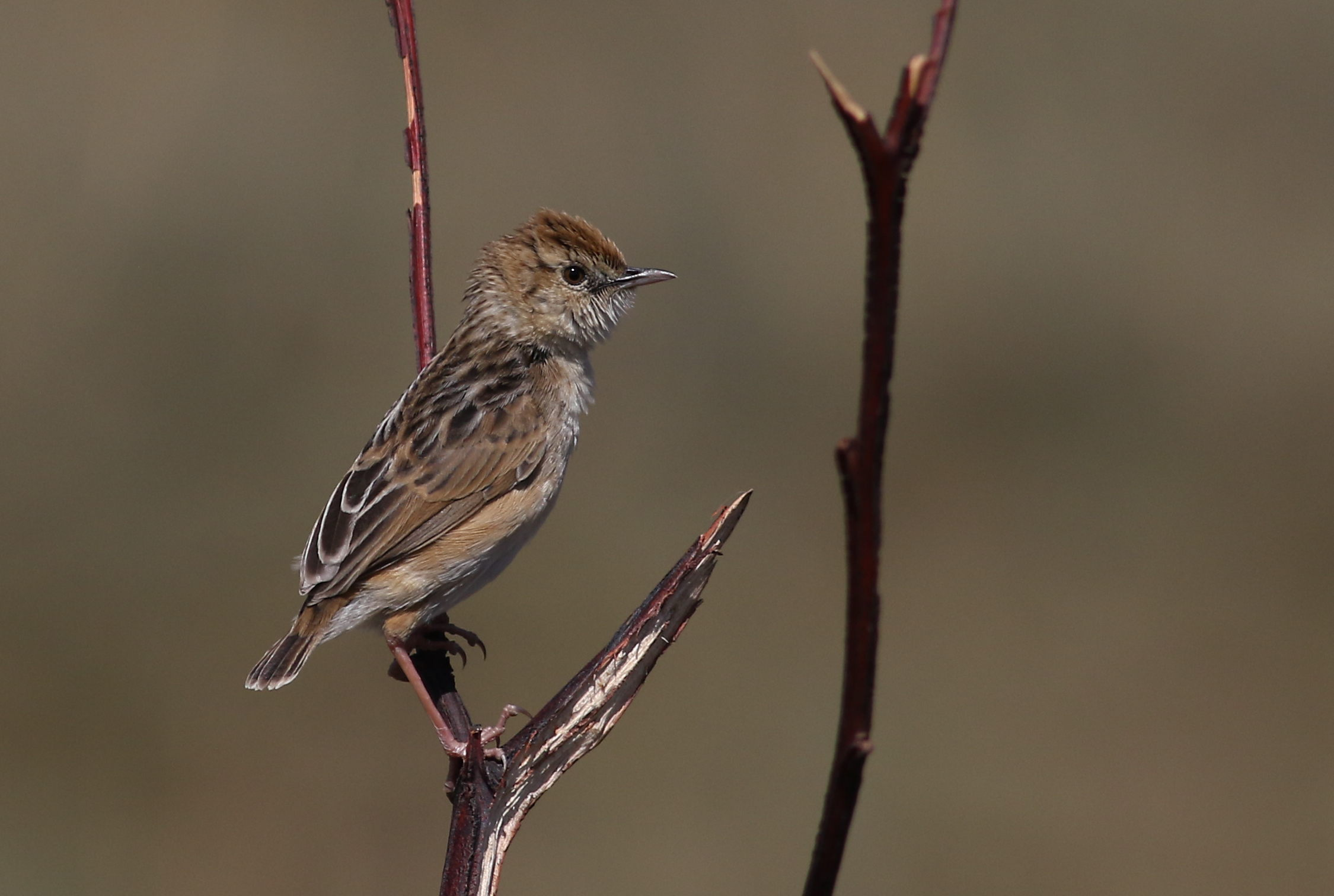

Conservation status
- Least Concern (IUCN 3.1)

Scientific classification
- Kingdom: Animalia
- Phylum: Chordata
- Class: Aves
- Order: Passeriformes
- Family: Cisticolidae
- Genus: Cisticola
- Species: C. ayresii

Binomial name
- Cisticola ayresii Hartlaub, 1863

= Wing-snapping cisticola =

Species of bird

The wing-snapping cisticola (Cisticola ayresii), also known as Ayres' cisticola, is a species of bird in the family Cisticolidae. Its scientific name honours South African ornithologist Thomas Ayres.

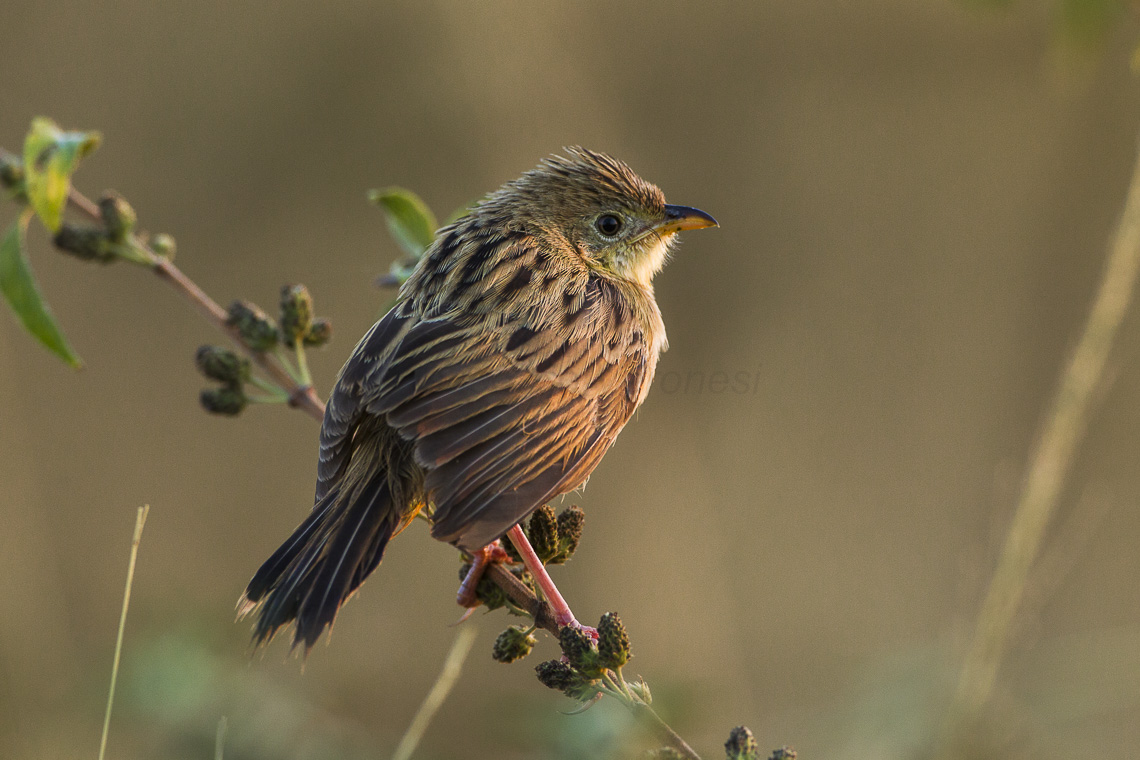
In Kenya

== Distribution and habitat ==
It is found throughout central and southern Africa. Its natural habitats are subtropical or tropical dry lowland grassland and subtropical or tropical high-altitude grassland.
