= Austin Roberts (zoologist) =

South African ornithologist, zoologist and author (1883–1948)

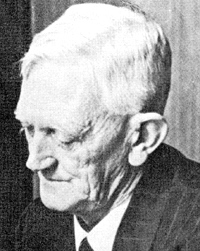
- Born: 3 January 1883; Pretoria
- Died: 5 May 1948 (aged 65); Lusikisiki
- Education: University of Pretoria
- Scientific career
- Fields: Ornithology, Zoology
- Workplaces: Transvaal Museum
- Author abbrev. (zoology): Roberts

Austin Roberts (3 January 1883 – 5 May 1948) was a South African zoologist. He is best known for his Birds of South Africa, first published in 1940. He also studied the mammalian fauna of the region: his work The mammals of South Africa was published posthumously in 1951. The 7th edition of Roberts' Birds of Southern Africa which appeared in 2005, is the standard work on the region's birds.

== Biography ==
Roberts, son of Alfred Roberts (church minister) and Marianne Fannin (naturalist and flower artist), was born in Pretoria and grew up in Potchefstroom, South Africa. He gained much of his early knowledge of zoology from Thomas Ayres (1828–1913), one of South Africa's first amateur ornithologists. Ayres taught Roberts to skin birds and small mammals as well as the importance of keeping accurate records on every specimen. He also encouraged Roberts to study birds systematically.

Roberts worked as a clerk in the Potchefstroom branch of Standard Bank from 1901 to 1903 and thereafter in the Department of Inland Revenue in Potchefstroom, Pretoria and Wolmaransstad. In April 1906 he enlisted as a trooper in John Royston's irregular regiment during the Bambatha Rebellion in Natal. The unit demobilised in August 1906 and Roberts and his brother, Noel, collected birds eggs and nests which they then presented to the Transvaal Museum in Pretoria. Roberts then worked as a temporary clerk in the Department of Agriculture until December 1907 when he joined the Natal militia as a trooper.

In 1908 he accompanied Frederick V. Kirby on an expedition to Quelimane district in Mozambique to destroy lions for the Boror Company on their coffee and sugar plantations. During this expedition Roberts collected 340 bird skins and several small mammals, which he sold to the Transvaal Museum. After a period of blackwater fever, Roberts was employed by the Transvaal Museum in 1910 as a temporary zoological assistant under J. W. B. Gunning. In 1913 he was given a permanent position and put in charge of the museum's bird and mammal collections.

In 1914 he married Dora S. Cooper (née Barrett), with whom he had three sons and a daughter. During World War I (1914-1918) he served in German East Africa and Palestine. He established a collection of over 30 000 birds and 13 000 mammals. These were collected on expeditions to Southern Rhodesia (now Zimbabwe, 1914), the Vernay-Lang Kalahari Expedition (1930), the Barlow Expedition to South West Africa (now Namibia).

He remained at the Transvaal Museum for 38 years until 1946, but it seems that his lack of formal education retarded both his professional advancement and recognition. Over the span of his career he described and named 429 bird taxa and 406 mammal taxa. His approach to taxonomy was to create a new genus, species or subspecies based on slight difference, a method he defended vigorously. His new genera were not generally well received by the "systematists" and the majority of the new genera, species and subspecies were not accepted. However, owing to his vast field experience he came to be regarded as the greatest authority on South African birds and mammals.

He was author of several manuscripts and articles in scientific publications, including over a hundred papers in the Annals of the Transvaal Museum, Journal of the South African Ornithologists' Union and The Ostrich. His book "The birds of South Africa", illustrated by Norman C.K. Lighton, was the first comprehensive work on the subject. It has been revised and expanded by various experts and several editions published.

Early in 1948 he was offered the post of curator of the Queen Victoria Museum in Harare, but his death on 5 May 1948 in a motor car accident in the Transkei region prevented him from taking up the position. The flowering plants he collected are in the National Herbarium, Pretoria, while his fungi went to the National Collection of Fungi at the Plant Protection Research Institute in Pretoria.

His compilation of a comprehensive book on mammals was more or less completed at the time of his death and subsequently edited by R. Bigalke, V.F. Fitzsimons and D.E. Malan and published as The mammals of South Africa, with illustrations by P.J. Smit.

Roberts had also been planning a comprehensive bird book but at the time of his death had only completed the part dealing with sea birds. The work was eventually completed by P.A.R. Hocky, W.R.J. Dean and P.G. Ryan and published as Roberts birds of Southern Africa.

== Eponyms ==
- The Austin Roberts Bird Sanctuary in Pretoria is named in his honour.
- He is commemorated in the name of Roberts's Warbler, Oreophilais robertsi.
- A species of lizard, Pachydactylus robertsi, is named in his honour.

== Awards ==
- In 1934, a grant from the Carnegie Foundation allowed him to visit museums and other institutions in Britain and the United States.
- In 1935 the University of Pretoria awarded him an honorary doctorate degree.
- Roberts was awarded the Senior Captain Scott Memorial Medal of the South African Biological Society in 1938
- The South African Association for the Advancement of Science awarded him the South Africa Medal (gold) in 1940.

== Works ==
His first scientific publication was "Visit to a colony of Ibis aethiopica" in the Journal of the South African Ornithologists' Union in 1905. His other publications include:

- The Mammals of South Africa. Johannesburg: Trustees of the "Mammals of South Africa" Book Fund. 1954.
- Our South African Birds (Ons Suid-Afrikaanse voëls). Cape Town: Cape Times. 1941. illustrated by Norman Lighton and Claude Gibney Finch-Davies
- The Birds of South Africa. Trustees of the South African Bird Book Fund. 1942.
- Museums, higher vertebrate zoology and their relationship to human affairs, Pretoria: Carnegie Corporation Visitors Grants Committee, 1935
- Descriptions of some new mammals [and] Some notes on birds and descriptions of new sub-species, Cambridge: University Press, 1919

== Memberships ==
Roberts was a member of many organisations, including:

- South African Ornithologists Union - founding member (1904)
- Transvaal Biological Society - foundation member, honorary secretary (1915)
- South African Biological Society - foundation member (1916), president (1933)
- Transvaal Game Protection Society
- Wild Life Protection Society of South Africa - council member
- South African Ornithological Society - founding member (1929), honorary life member (1939)
- South African Association for the Advancement of Science - member (1915), president (1936)
- South African Museums Association - founding member (1937), president (1944)
- American Society of Mammalogists - charter member (1919)
- British Ornithologists' Union - empire member (1930)
- Bavarian Ornithological Society - corresponding member (1922)
- Zoological Society of London - corresponding member (1934)
