= Thomas Ayres (ornithologist) =

South African ornithologist (1828–1913)

Thomas H. Ayres
- Born: July 1828; Hereford, England
- Died: 31 July 1913 (aged 85); Potchefstroom, South Africa
- Scientific career
- Fields: Ornithology

Thomas H. Ayres (July 1828 – 31 July 1913) was a British-born South African ornithologist. Ayres is commemorated in the names of the Ayres' hawk-eagle (Hieraaetus ayresii), Ayres' cisticola (Cisticola ayresii), and the white-winged flufftail (Sarothrura ayresi).

== Early life and career ==
Ayres was born in Hereford, England, to John Ayres, the mayor of Hereford, and Helene Duschesne in July 1828. He and his family emigrated to Natal as part of the great influx of British settlers to South Africa in 1850. Two years later, Ayres joined a group of colonists departing for the gold fields of Australia, but was unsuccessful and returned to Natal a few years later to farm in what is now the Pinetown district, just inland of Durban.

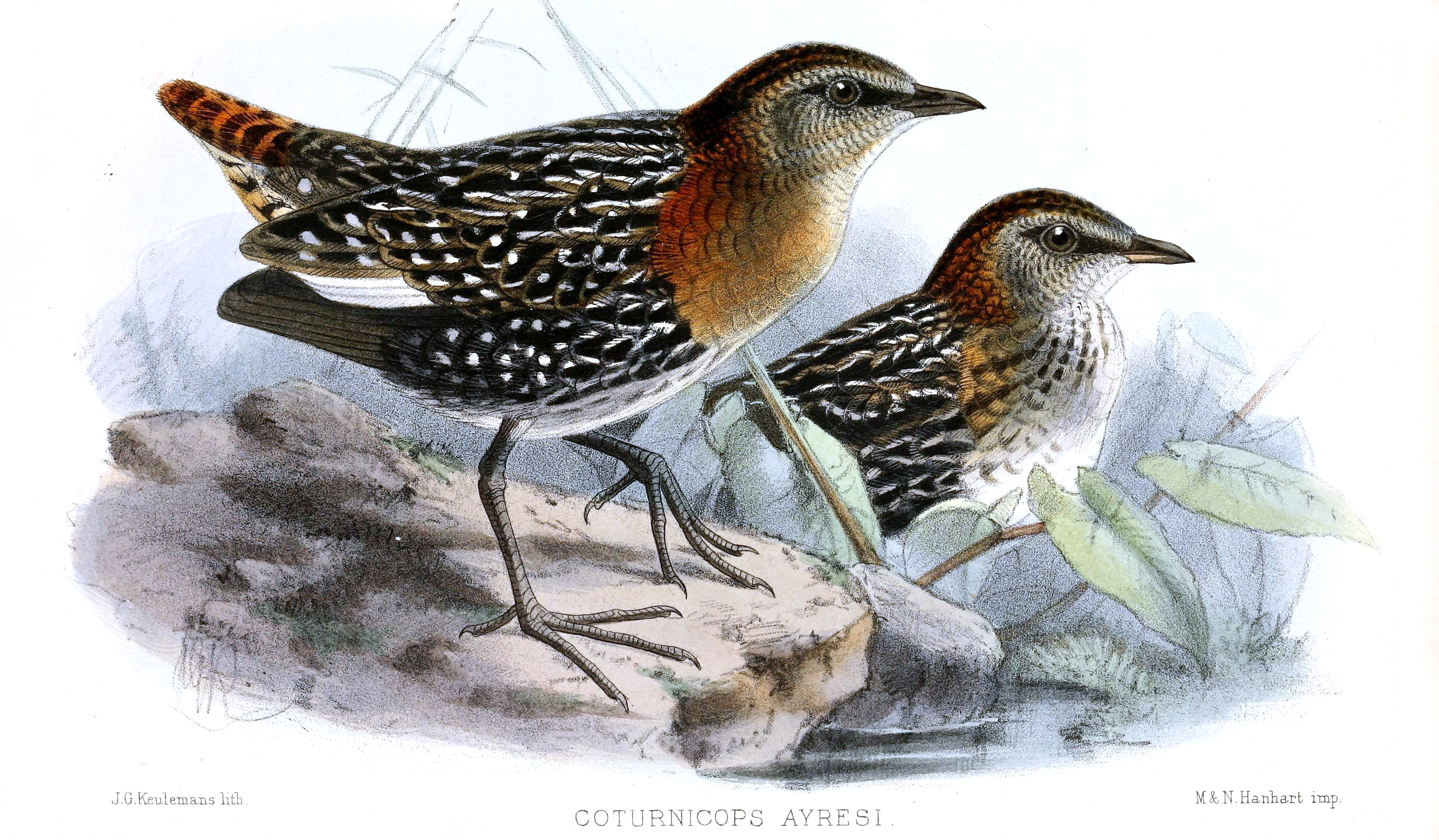
The scientific name of the white-winged flufftail (pictured) honours Ayres; he discovered the species near Potchefstroom.

== Natal period ==
Ayres became one of the colonists in Natal who augmented their incomes by collecting and preparing items of natural history, which were sold to ardent and often well-funded naturalists in western Europe. Most new bird species shot by Ayres were named by K. J. G. Hartlaub of Bremen in Germany.

Some of the species named by Hartlaub on Ayres's specimens were from the Port Natal area or just inland, including the ashy flycatcher, Muscicapa (Alseonax) caerulescens, and the green twinspot. Ayres shot the type of the elusive forest-dwelling orange thrush, Turdus (Zoothera) gurneyi, in Town Bush, Pietermaritzburg, and was instrumental in obtaining the type of Gurney's sugarbird, Promerops gurneyi, somewhere in Natal, which was described by Jules Verreaux in 1871.

Ayres's main patron was John Henry Gurney Sr., of Norwich, England, who consulted Hartlaub on taxonomy. Gurney disposed some of his material to R. Bowdler Sharpe of the British Museum (Natural History), in South Kensington, London, and others.

== Transvaal period ==
In 1865 Thomas and his brother Jack moved to the Transvaal, where they farmed, panned for gold, brewed and collected birds for sale. He and his brother also hunted and traded with the Boer settlers. He settled down at Potchefstroom, where he ultimately died. Here he did much to encourage the young Austin Roberts, who was to become a well-known zoologist. The slaty egret and white-winged crake, S. ayresi, were new species that he obtained in this region.
