= J. W. B. Gunning =

Dutch physician (1860–1913)

Jan Willem Boudewijn Gunning
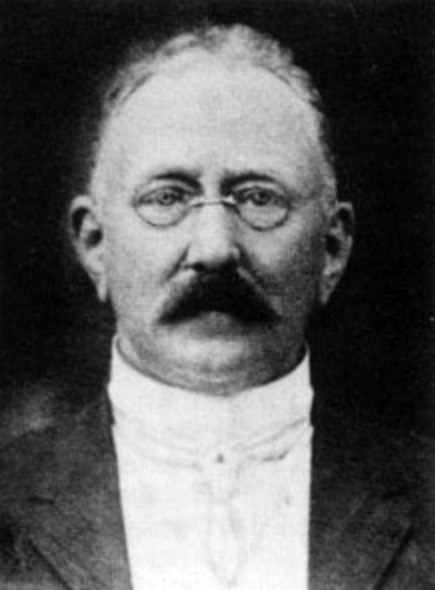
- Born: 3 September 1860; Hilversum
- Died: 26 June 1913 (aged 52); Pretoria
- Occupation: Physician

Jan Willem Boudewijn Gunning (3 September 1860 in Hilversum, North Holland – 26 June 1913 in Pretoria), was a Dutch physician, who served as the director of both the Staatsmuseum and what was then known as the Pretoria Zoological Gardens (now the National Zoological Gardens of South Africa).

Gunning was the second son of the famous Dutch theologian Johannes Hermanus Gunning (1829-1905) and Johanna Jacoba Gunning-Hoog. He attended the University of Amsterdam, Leiden University and Jena University, qualifying as a doctor of medicine. In 1884 he emigrated to South Africa and started a practice in the Orange Free State. The same year, he met and married Susanna Neethling (26 April 1862 - 14 May 1889) on 10 November 1884. From the Free State, he moved to the Cape Colony and practised there until 1897 when he was appointed as first director of the Staatsmuseum (State Museum) in Pretoria, which later was renamed the Transvaal Museum. He remained director until his death in 1913. Gunning was responsible for founding the National Zoo in Pretoria in 1899.

While Winston Churchill was imprisoned in Pretoria during the Boer War, he became well acquainted with Gunning, who was one of the directors of the prison. Of him, he said:

Dr. Gunning was an amiable little Hollander, fat, rubicund and well educated. He was a keen politician and much attached to the Boer Government, which paid him an excellent salary for looking after the State Museum. He had a wonderful collection of postage stamps, and was also engaged in forming a Zoological Garden. This last ambition had just before the war led him into most serious trouble, for he was unable to resist the lion which Mr. Rhodes had offered him. He confided to me that the President had spoken most harshly to him in consequence and had peremptorily ordered the immediate return of the beast under threats of instant dismissal.

— Winston Churchill

Capt. Aylmer Haldane, another prisoner in the facility had the following to say:

In charge of us were two officials, one a Boer commandant, the other a Hollander gentleman, Dr Gunning, who at the same time discharged the double functions of manager of the Zoological Gardens and Curator of the Museum. The commandant was not exactly a pattern of every virtue, but the doctor was uniformly courteous and did all that he could to make our confined existence as bearable as possible.

— Aylmer Haldane

On the death of his first wife, he married Ellen Elizabeth Dobbin (born 30 December 1867) of Bethulie on 19 November 1889. She was the daughter of William Rouse Dobbin and Emma Elizabeth Kirkham.

He compiled A Checklist of the Birds of South Africa with Alwin Karl Haagner in 1910. The bird species Sheppardia gunningi, also called east coast akalat or Gunning's akelat, is named for him.

== Notes and references ==
- Haldane, Aylmer (1901). How We Escaped from Pretoria. Edinburgh: W. Blackwood.
- Churchill, Winston (1900). London to Ladysmith via Pretoria. London: Longmans, Green & Co.
- Grobler, Elda (11 May 2006). Collections management practices at the Transvaal Museum, 1913-1964 : Anthropological, Archaeological and Historical (D.Phil). University of Pretoria. hdl:2263/24550.
- Verwey, E. J., ed. (1995). New Dictionary of South African Biography. Vol. III. HSRC Press. p. 361. ISBN 978-0-7969-1648-8.
