= Alwin Karl Haagner =

South African ornithologist and mammalogist (1880–1962)

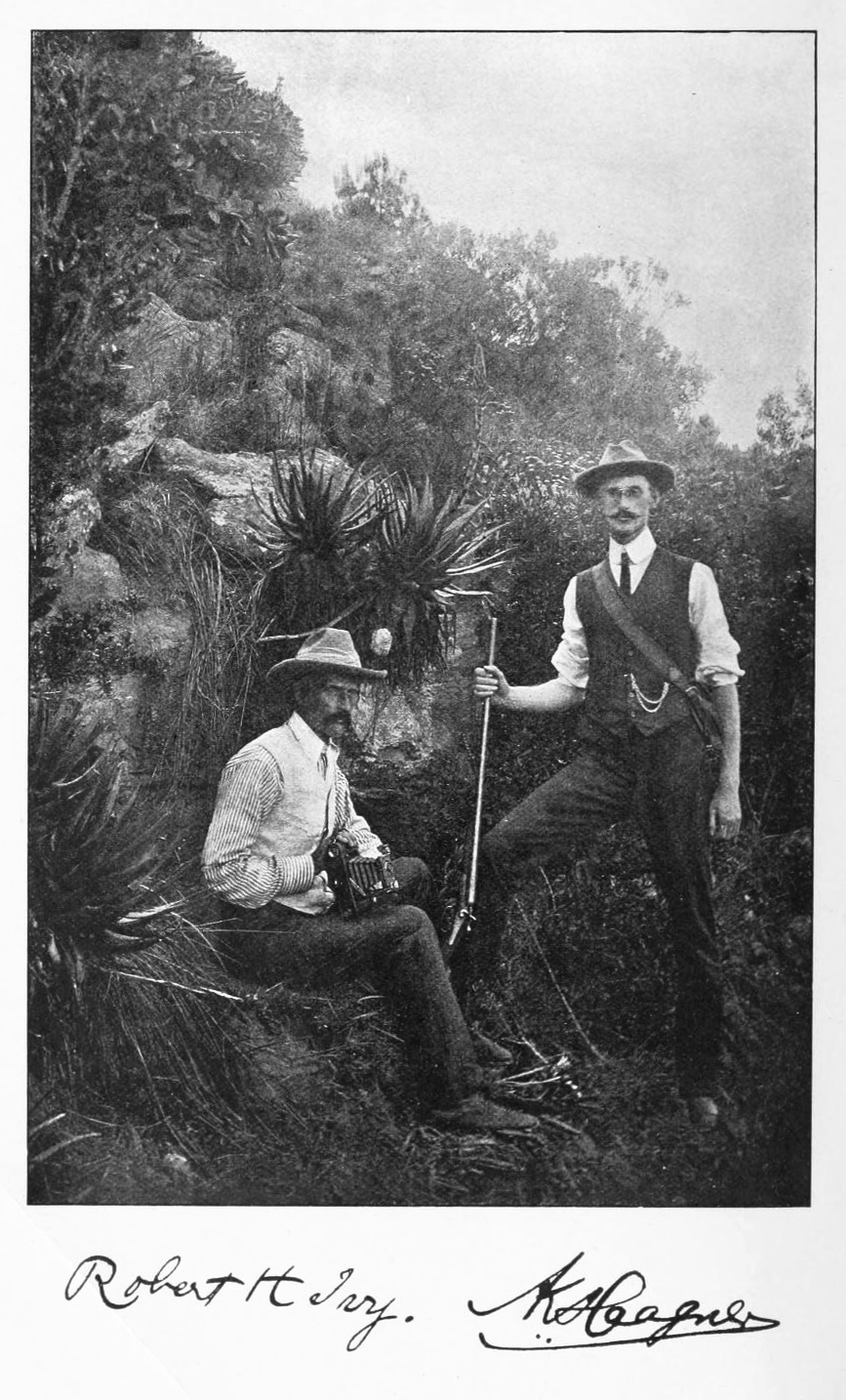
Haagner (right) with Robert Henry Ivy

Alwin Karl Haagner (1 June 1880 – 15 September 1962) was a South African ornithologist and mammalogist, who was instrumental in the establishment of the Kruger National Park and in early measures to raise awareness and protect Southern African wildlife.

He served for a decade as the director of the Pretoria Zoological Gardens. He wrote numerous works on South African birds and the protection of wildlife.

== Life and work ==
Haagner was born in Hankey near Humansdorp where his father, Sigmund, an accountant at the explosives factory in Modderfontein, taught him at home. Young Haagner then worked alongside his father in the accounts department but found natural history of greater interest. At the age of 19, he published a note on the Cape Monitor followed by several papers on the birds of Modderfontein in the Ibis around 1901–1902. He was one of the founding members of the South African Ornithologists' Union begun in Johannesburg on 8 April 1904, an organization that amalgamated with the Transvaal Biological Society in 1916 to form the South African Biological Society. Haagner worked in the Transvaal Museum from 1906 collecting grass species among other specimens and becoming an assistant in ornithology from 1908 to J.W.B. Gunning. Along with Gunning he began to assemble a collection of birds from the region. Haagner left the museum in 1911, was succeeded by Austin Roberts, and became director of the Pretoria Zoological Gardens. During his directorship, animals were transferred to zoos in Europe and the United States through dealers in wild animals, leading to accusations that he was involved in their trade. His argument was that he was promoting the continued survival of endangered species, by ensuring that breeding pairs were protected within zoos worldwide. He then worked at a farm near Beira, Mozambique and returned to South Africa somewhere in the 1940s and settled in Pietermartizburg, working as an accountant.

A lecture tour through the United States in 1920 led to the University of Pittsburgh awarding him an honorary Doctor of Science degree in 1922. He took an interest in the Kruger National Park and played an important role, along with J. Stevenson-Hamilton, in drafting the National Parks Acts of 1926. He was, along with R.H. Ivy, a co-author of Sketches of South African Bird-Life and compiled A Checklist of the Birds of South Africa with J. W. B. Gunning, first director of the Transvaal Museum in 1910. He helped revise the classification of the South African Cisticola species. Along with W. T. Hornaday, he wrote The vanishing game of South Africa: A warning and an appeal (1922). Haagner was an honorary member of the British Ornithologists' Union, the Royal Hungarian Bureau of Ornithology and the American Ornithologists' Union.

== Personal life ==
Haagner married Johanna A. Moll in May 1910 and they had a daughter. After the death of Johanna, he married Gwendoline E. Allen in 1922 and they had a son. Haagner died at his home in Pietermaritzburg in 1962.
