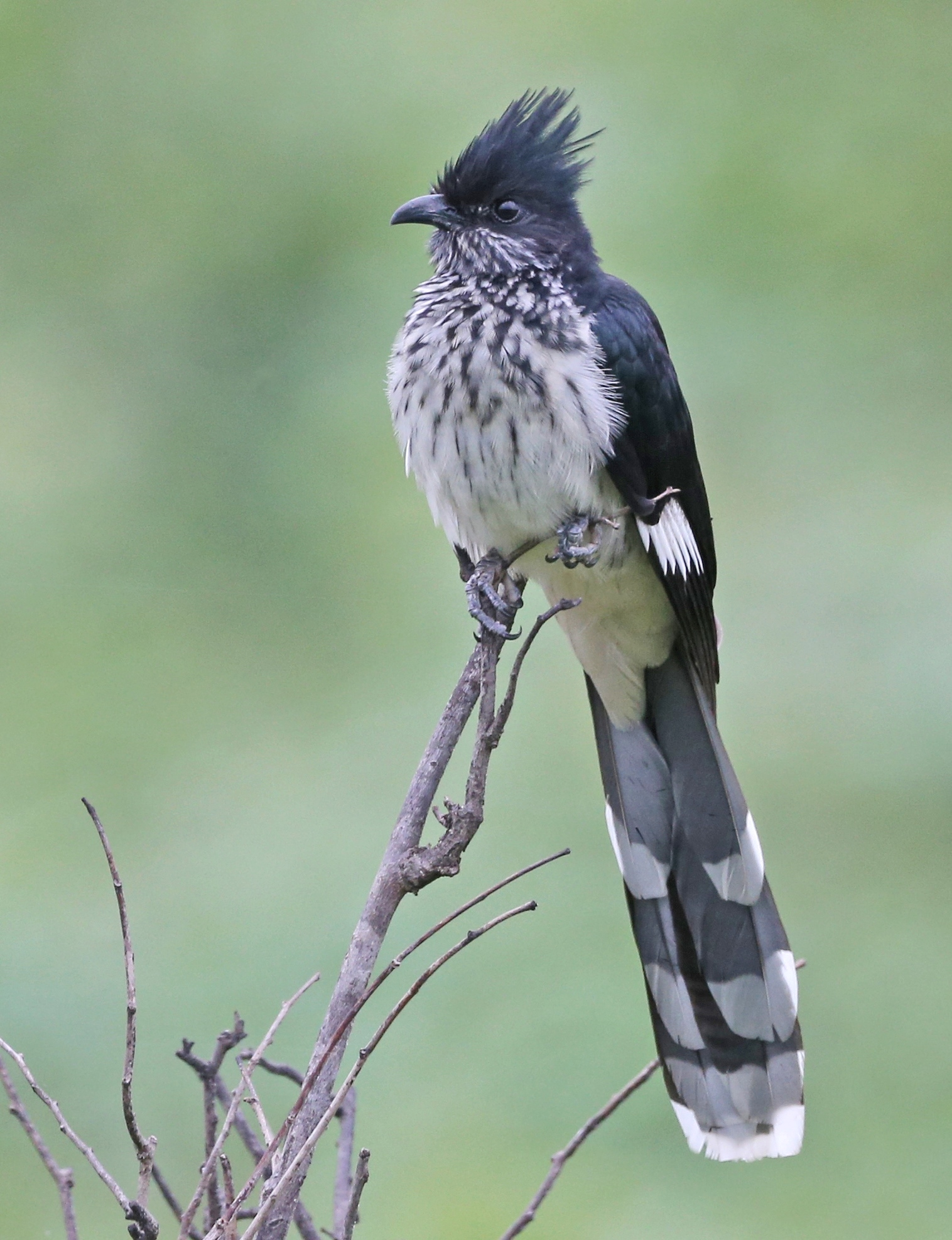

Conservation status
- Least Concern (IUCN 3.1)

Scientific classification
- Kingdom: Animalia
- Phylum: Chordata
- Class: Aves
- Order: Cuculiformes
- Family: Cuculidae
- Genus: Clamator
- Species: C. levaillantii

Binomial name
- Clamator levaillantii (Swainson, 1829)

= Levaillant's cuckoo =

Species of bird

Levaillant's cuckoo (Clamator levaillantii) is a cuckoo which is a resident breeding species in Africa south of the Sahara. It is found in bushy habitats. It is a brood parasite, using the nests of bulbuls and babblers. It was named in honour of the French explorer, collector and ornithologist, François Le Vaillant.

== Description ==
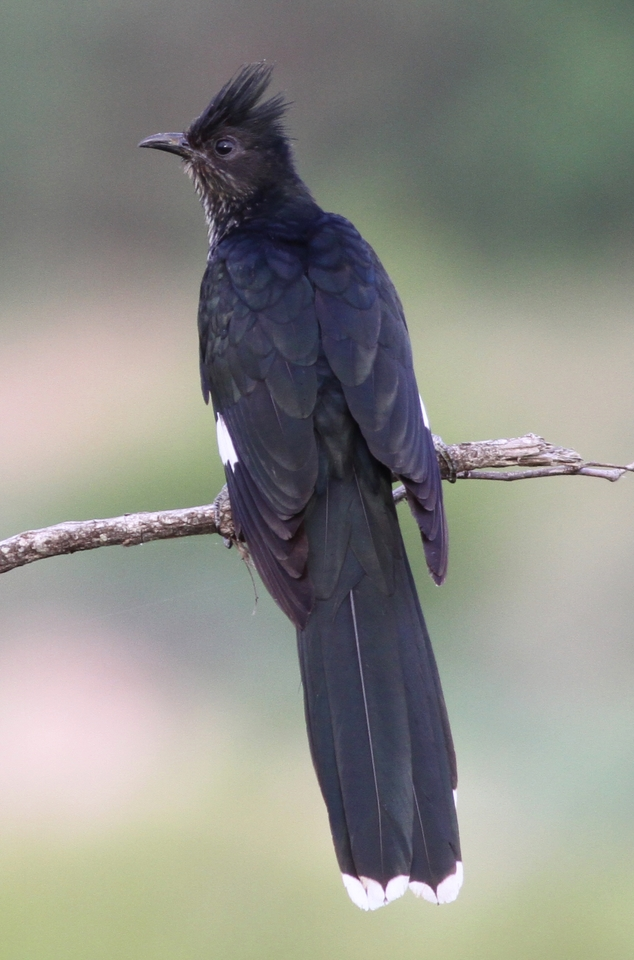
View of upperparts

The cuckoo is 37.5 cm (15 in) long, longer tailed than pied cuckoo, and with a more heavily streaked throat. There are two colour morphs. The light morph is black above, faintly glossed bluish or greenish. The throat streaking may extend on to the sides. The primaries and rectrix tips are white. The dark morph is black except for the white primary patch and white spots on the outer tail feathers (these are absent in dark pied cuckoo. The juvenile Levaillant's cuckoo is brown above, rufous on the wing-coverts and rectrix tips, with a buff forehead, face and underparts, and the throat more streaked. The call is a low ringing kuwu-weer, kuwu-weer... and an excited ku-wi-wi-wi.

== Behaviour ==
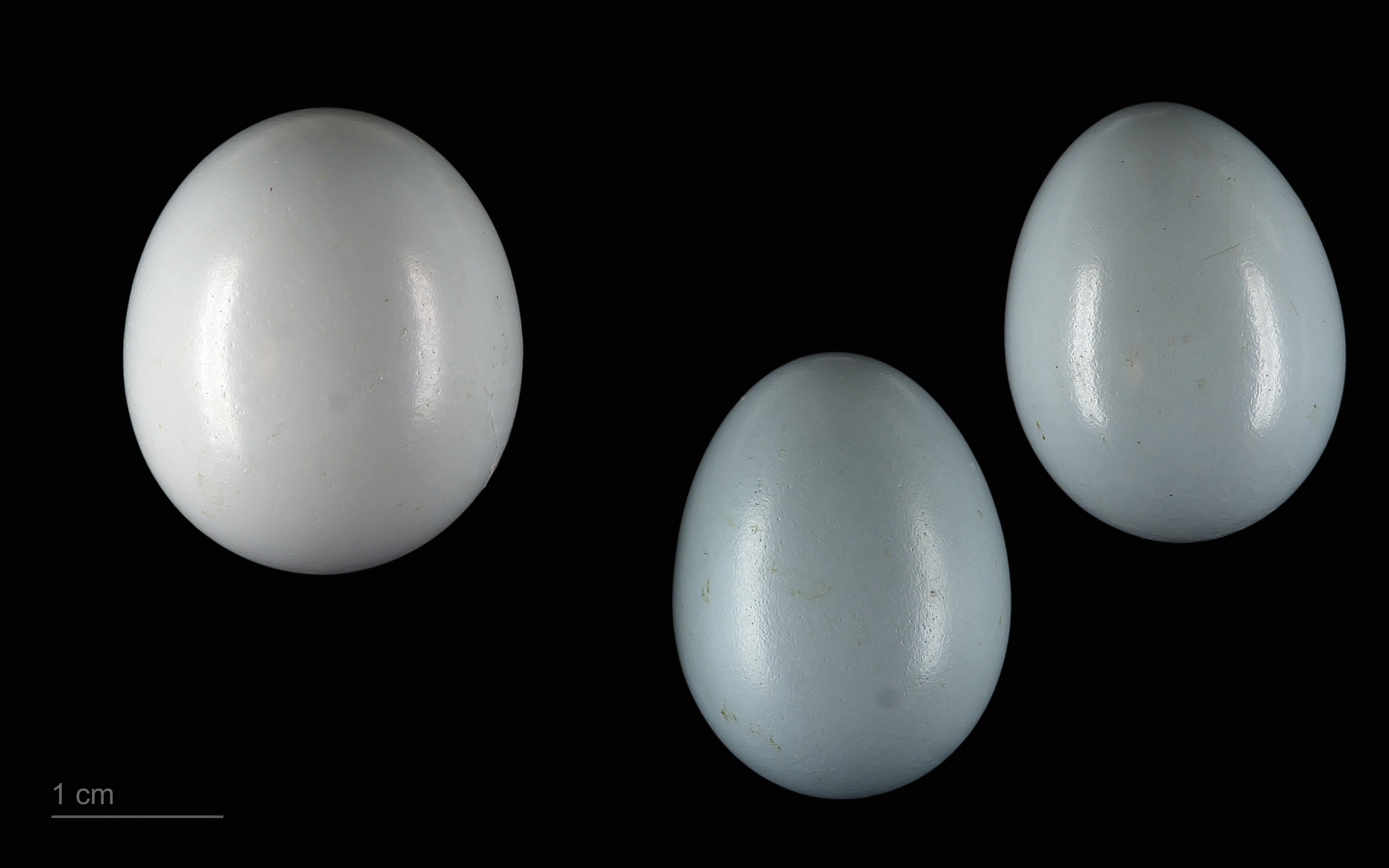
Clamator levaillantii in a spawn of Turdoide plebejus - MHNT

Levaillant's cuckoo is a brood parasite and the female lays her eggs in the nest of another species of bird, typically the southern pied babbler (Turdoides bicolor), the bare-cheeked babbler (Turdoides gymnogenys), the Hartlaub's babbler (Turdoides hartlaubii) or the arrow-marked babbler (Turdoides jardineii). Both the male and female cuckoo fly around acrobatically to distract the host birds. The male continues the distraction while the female lays the egg. Unlike many other species of cuckoo, the newly-hatched cuckoo chick does not push the other eggs and nestlings out of the nest. It leaves the nest after about ten days and becomes independent in four to six weeks.
