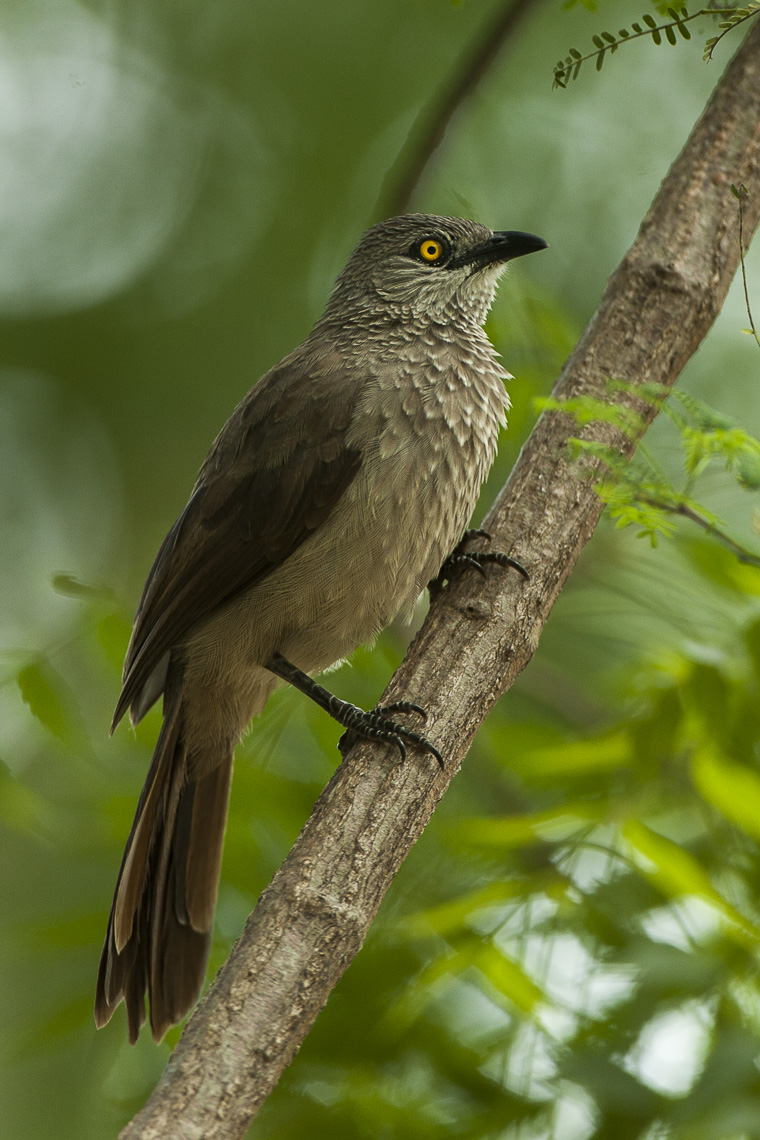
- Brown babbler in Baringo, Kenya

Conservation status
- Least Concern (IUCN 3.1)

Scientific classification
- Kingdom: Animalia
- Phylum: Chordata
- Class: Aves
- Order: Passeriformes
- Family: Leiothrichidae
- Genus: Turdoides
- Species: T. plebejus

Binomial name
- Turdoides plebejus (Cretzschmar, 1828)

= Brown babbler =

Species of bird

The brown babbler (Turdoides plebejus) is a species of bird in the family Leiothrichidae. It is predominantly found in West Africa, but ranging from the Gambia to Kenya. The species is common across its range. The species is also known as the Sudan babbler.

== Taxonomy and systematics ==
The brown babbler was described in 1828 by Philipp Jakob Cretzschmar from a specimen collected in the Kordofan Province of Sudan. He originally placed it in the bulbul genus Ixos. The species is closely related to and forms a superspecies with the white-headed babbler of eastern Sudan, Ethiopia and Eritrea, and the arrow-marked babbler of central and southern Africa. The Old World babbler family Timaliidae has been the subject of much research and has been split by some taxonomic authorities. This move would place this species with the laughingthrushes in the family Leiothrichidae.

There are three recognised subspecies, the nominate race, platycirca and cincera. A fourth subspecies, uamensis, is synonymized with cincera.

== Description ==
The brown babbler is a medium-sized Turdoides babbler, measuring 22–25 centimetres (8.7–9.8 in) in length and weighs around 52–80 grams (1.8–2.8 oz). The plumage is grey-brown with a white-streaked throat and breast and a scaled head. The wings are bronze-brown, the bill black and the legs dusky or slaty black. The iris of the eyes are yellow. The sexes are alike, and juvenile birds are like the adults but with plainer and browner plumage and brown irises.

== Distribution and habitat ==
The brown babbler inhabits the broad band of the Sahel between the Sahara Desert and the tropical forests of Western Africa, from southern Mauritania, Senegal and the Gambia to southern Sudan, Uganda and western Kenya. The species lives in open savanna, wooded grasslands, riparian habitat in drier areas, degraded cultivation, farmlands, parks and gardens. The species is common across its range and readily lives in human-modified habitat and is not considered threatened with extinction.

The species is mostly sedentary (non-migratory), but is thought to make some seasonal movements based upon local conditions related to the rainy seasons. In central Burkina Faso it is observed more frequently during the rainy season, and it has also been observed to be erratically absent or present in the Kampala region of Uganda.

== Behaviour ==
The brown babbler consumes a variety of insects including ants, beetles, termites, and praying mantises, as well as other invertebrates, berries, and fruit. It will also opportunistically take carrion. They generally forage on the ground and in family parties of up to 14 individuals.

== Gallery ==
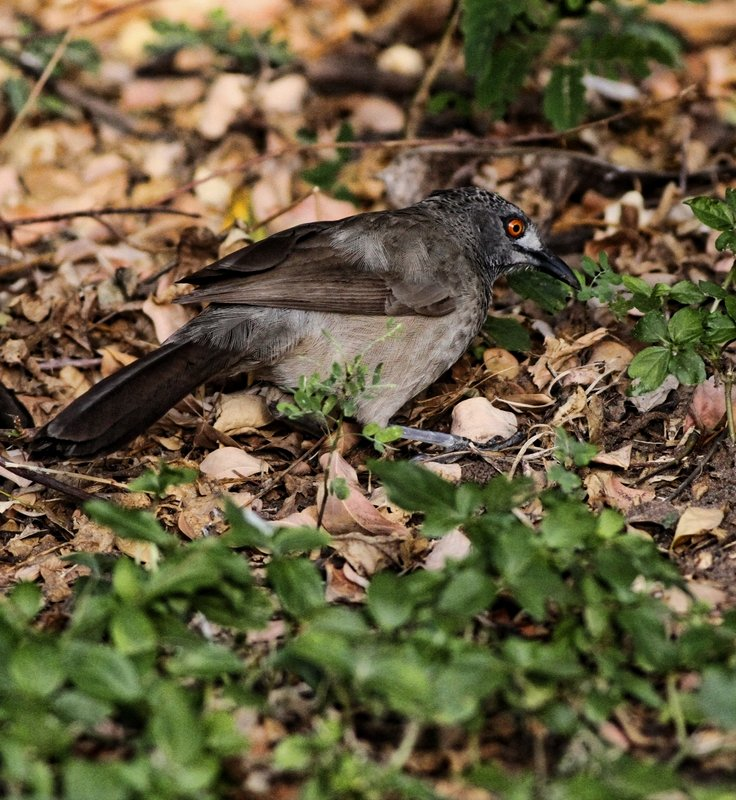
Brown babblers forage on the ground.

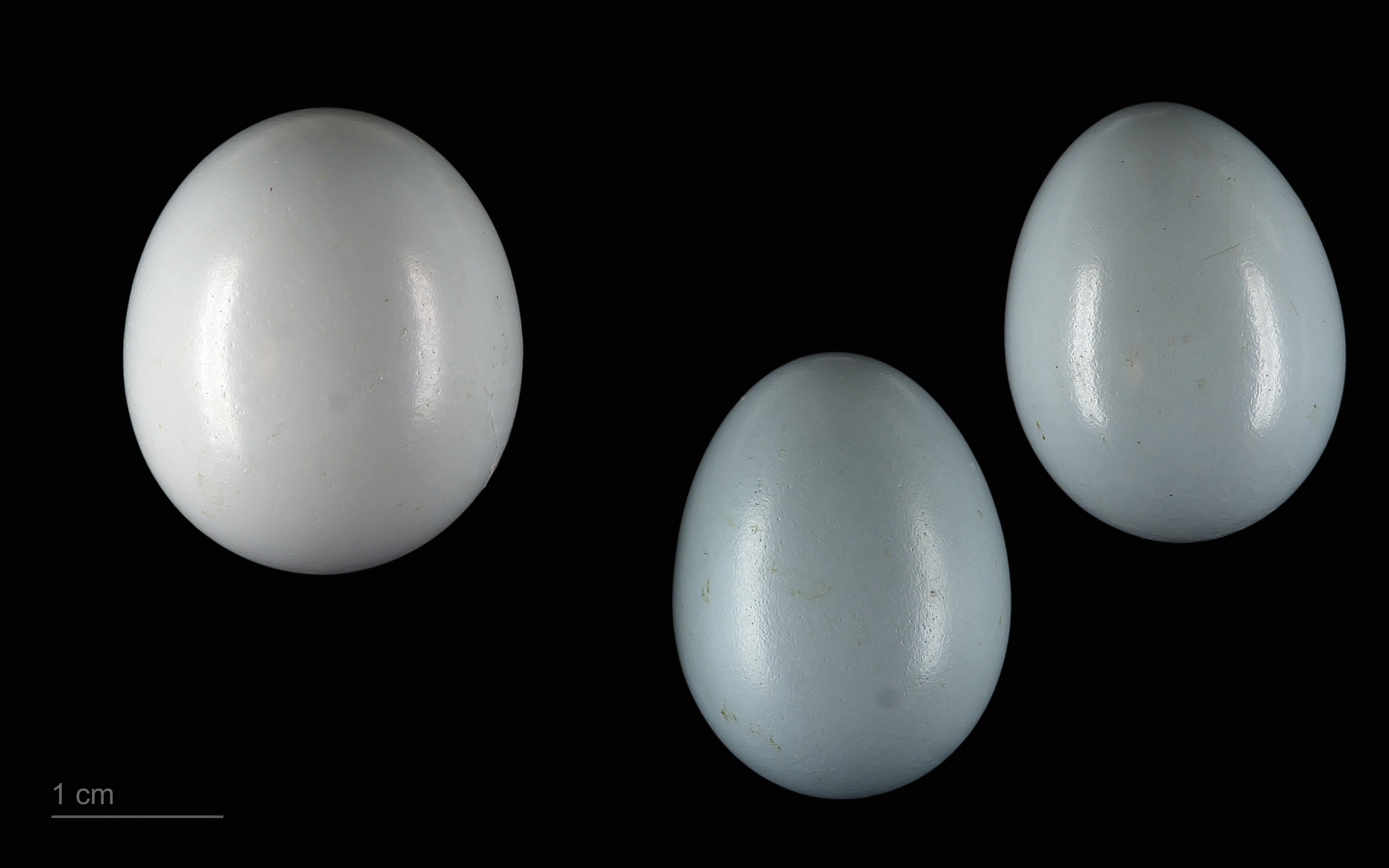
Clamator levaillantii in a spawn of Turdoides plebejus - MHNT
