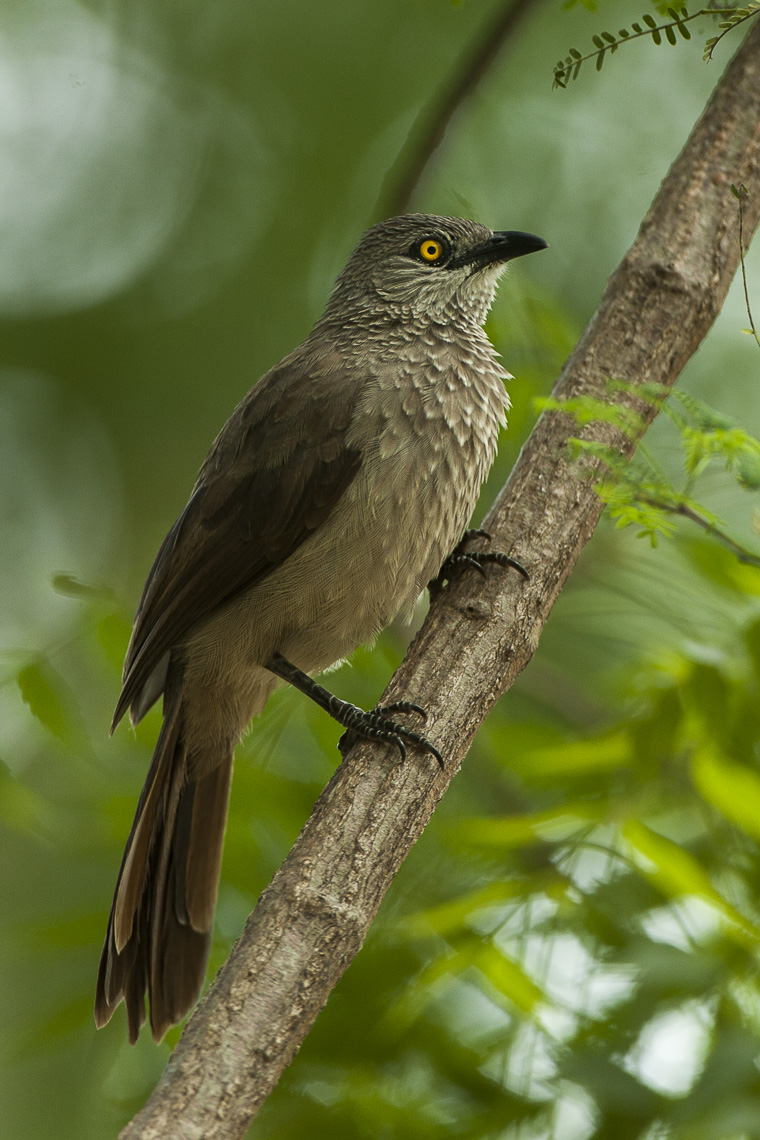
- Brown babbler (Turdoides plebejus)

Scientific classification
- Kingdom: Animalia
- Phylum: Chordata
- Class: Aves
- Order: Passeriformes
- Family: Leiothrichidae
- Genus: Turdoides; Cretzschmar, 1826

Type species
- Turdoides leucocephala (white-headed babbler) Cretzschmar, 1826

Species
- See list

= Turdoides =

Genus of birds in the family Leiothrichidae

Turdoides is a genus of passerine birds in the laughingthrush family Leiothrichidae. The species are distributed across Africa and southern Asia and are typically fairly large, long-tailed birds which forage in noisy groups. The majority of species have drab brown or grey-brown plumage. Several species that were included in Turdoides in the past have been reassigned to Argya following a 2018 study that found multiple clades.

The genus Turdoides was introduced in 1826 by the German physician Philipp Jakob Cretzschmar specifically for the white-headed babbler. The name combines the thrush genus Turdus with the Ancient Greek -oidēs meaning "resembling".

== Species ==
The genus contains the following 19 species:

Image	Scientific name	Common name	Distribution
	Turdoides nipalensis	Spiny babbler	Nepal
	Turdoides atripennis	Capuchin babbler	African tropical rainforest
	Turdoides gilberti	White-throated mountain babbler	Cameroonian Highlands forests
	Turdoides chapini	Chapin's babbler	western foothills of Albertine Rift montane forests
	Turdoides rufocinctus	Red-collared babbler	Albertine Rift montane forests
	Turdoides plebejus	Brown babbler	northern sub-Saharan Africa
	Turdoides leucopygia	White-rumped babbler	Horn of Africa
	Turdoides hindei	Hinde's babbler	Kenya
	Turdoides squamulata	Scaly babbler	riverine and coastal Horn of Africa : Tana, Jubba and Shebelle rivers
	Turdoides jardineii	Arrow-marked babbler	central/southern sub-Saharan Africa
	Turdoides gymnogenys	Bare-cheeked babbler	western Angola and northern Namibia
	Turdoides leucocephala	White-headed babbler	eastern Sudan, western Ethiopia and Eritrea
	Turdoides reinwardtii	Blackcap babbler	West Africa to southern CAF
	Turdoides tenbrosa	Dusky babbler	western, eastern and southern South Sudan and adjacent areas
	Turdoides bicolor	Southern pied babbler	Kalahari Basin
	Turdoides hartlaubii	Hartlaub's babbler	central-southern sub-Saharan Africa
	Turdoides sharpei	Black-lored babbler	Lake Victoria basin
	Turdoides melanops	Black-faced babbler	southern Angola, northern Namibia and Botswana
	Turdoides hypoleuca	Northern pied babbler	Kenya and Tanzania
