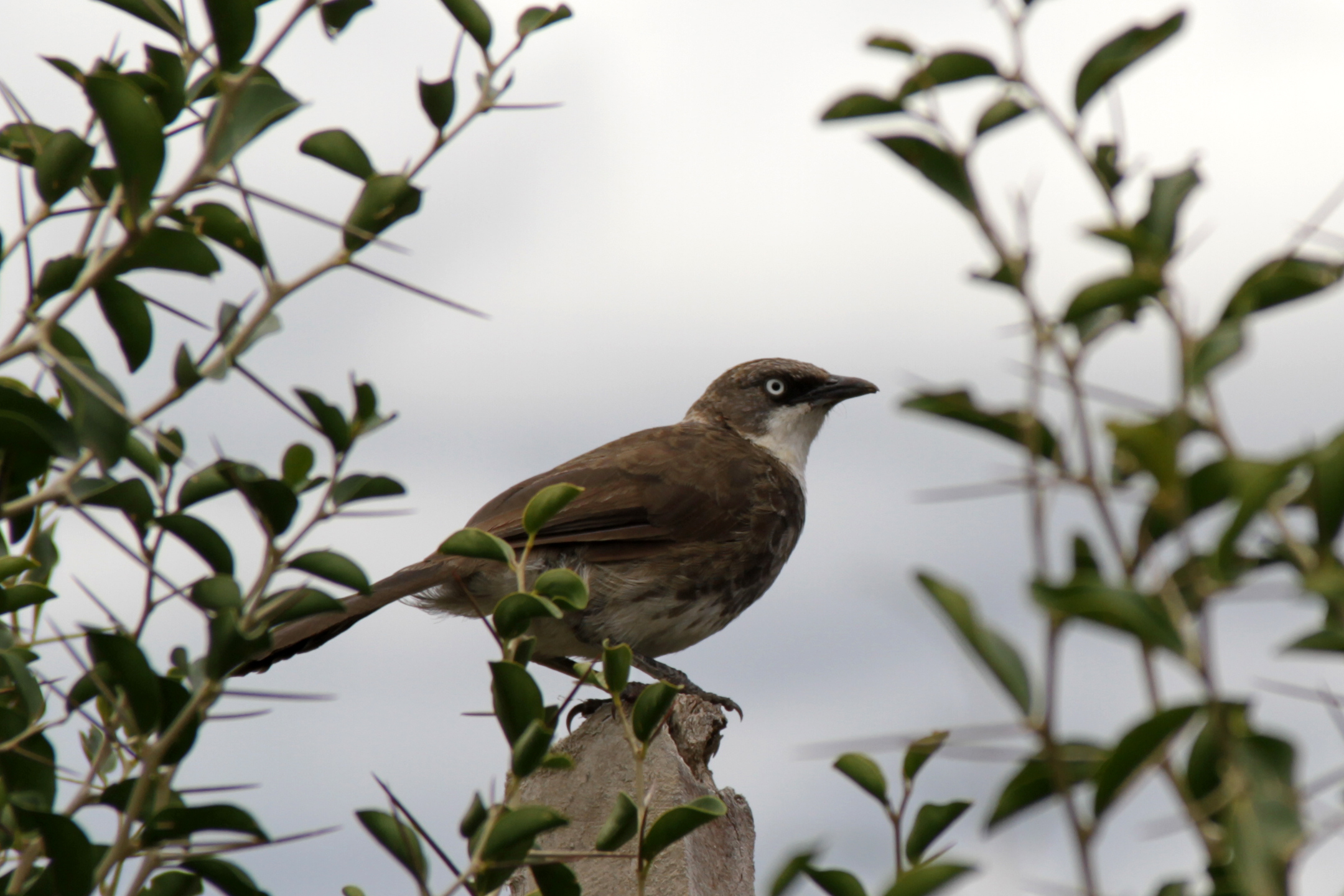
- In Kenya

Conservation status
- Least Concern (IUCN 3.1)

Scientific classification
- Kingdom: Animalia
- Phylum: Chordata
- Class: Aves
- Order: Passeriformes
- Family: Leiothrichidae
- Genus: Turdoides
- Species: T. hypoleuca

Binomial name
- Turdoides hypoleuca (Cabanis, 1878)

= Northern pied babbler =

Species of bird

The northern pied babbler (Turdoides hypoleuca) is a species of bird in the family Leiothrichidae. It is found in Kenya and Tanzania. Its natural habitats are subtropical or tropical moist lowland forest and subtropical or tropical dry shrubland.
