= Red-collared babbler =

Conservation status
- Endangered (IUCN 3.1)

Scientific classification
- Kingdom: Animalia
- Phylum: Chordata
- Class: Aves
- Order: Passeriformes
- Family: Leiothrichidae
- Genus: Turdoides
- Species: T. rufocinctus

Binomial name
- Turdoides rufocinctus (Rothschild, 1908)

Species of bird

The red-collared babbler (Turdoides rufocinctus), also known as the red-collared mountain-babbler, is a passerine bird in the family Leiothrichidae. It is native to the Albertine Rift montane forests. It is threatened by habitat loss.

The red-collared babbler was moved from the genus Kupeornis to Turdoides based on the results of a molecular phylogenetic study published in 2018.
