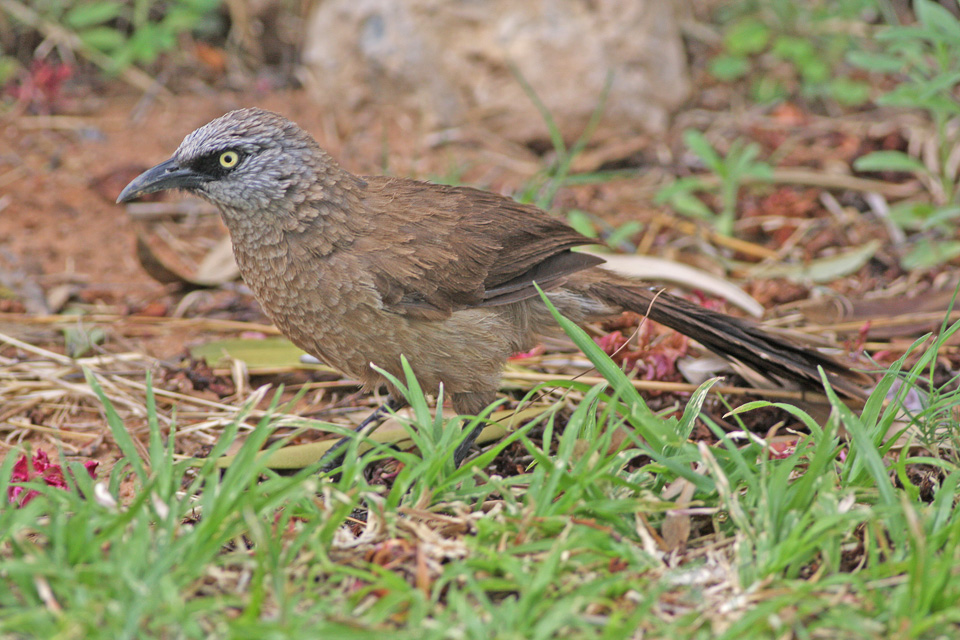
- At Etosha NP, Namibia

Conservation status
- Least Concern (IUCN 3.1)

Scientific classification
- Kingdom: Animalia
- Phylum: Chordata
- Class: Aves
- Order: Passeriformes
- Family: Leiothrichidae
- Genus: Turdoides
- Species: T. melanops

Binomial name
- Turdoides melanops (Hartlaub, 1867)

= Black-faced babbler =

Species of songbird

The black-faced babbler (Turdoides melanops) is a species of songbird in the family Leiothrichidae. It was once it was considered conspecific with the black-lored babbler, A. sharpei.

As defined here, it occurs in northwestern Botswana, northern Namibia, and Angola. Like other Turdoides, it is found low or on the ground in or near dense woody vegetation, including in cultivated areas.

== Description ==
Black-faced babblers are 21 to 25 cm (8.5 to 10 in) long. Birds are largely grayish brown with geographically and individually variable white mottling, especially below. The combination of pale yellow or white eyes and black lores (the areas between the eye and the bill) separates this species from similar babblers, though all juvenile babblers have brown eyes.

The calls are described as "A nasal 'wha-wha-wha' and a harsh, fast 'papapapa'."

== Behavior ==
They forage in leaf litter and are "much more furtive than the other babblers".
