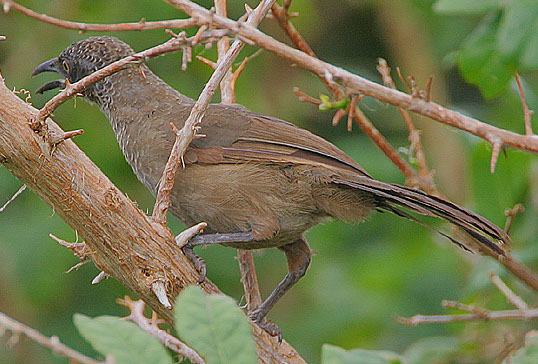

Conservation status
- Least Concern (IUCN 3.1)

Scientific classification
- Kingdom: Animalia
- Phylum: Chordata
- Class: Aves
- Order: Passeriformes
- Family: Leiothrichidae
- Genus: Turdoides
- Species: T. squamulata

Binomial name
- Turdoides squamulata (Shelley, 1884)

= Scaly babbler =

Species of bird

The scaly babbler (Turdoides squamulata) is a species of bird in the family Leiothrichidae. It is native to the Jubba, Shebelle and Tana rivers and Kenyan shoreline. Its natural habitats are subtropical or tropical dry forest and subtropical or tropical dry shrubland.
