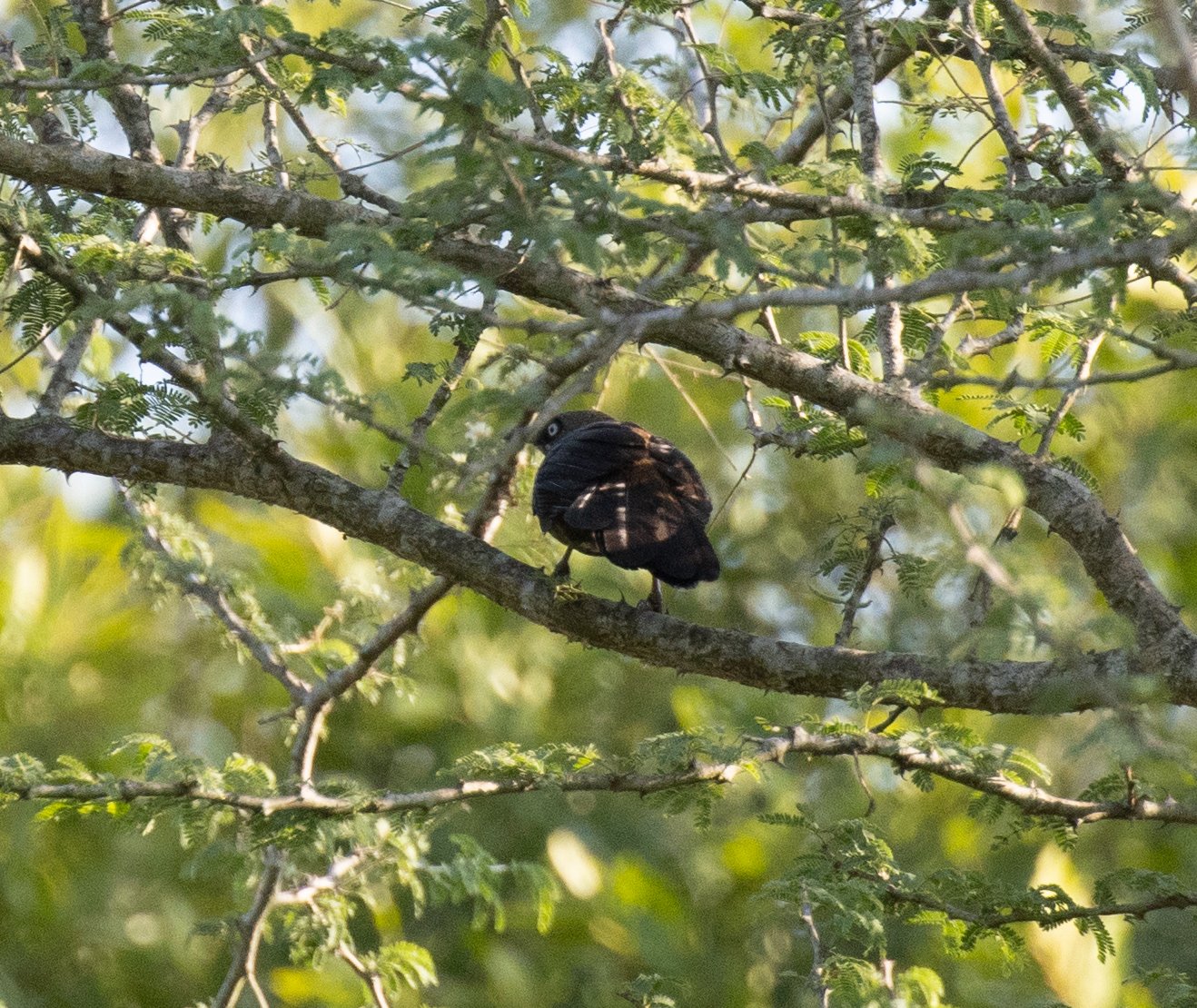

Conservation status
- Least Concern (IUCN 3.1)

Scientific classification
- Kingdom: Animalia
- Phylum: Chordata
- Class: Aves
- Order: Passeriformes
- Family: Leiothrichidae
- Genus: Turdoides
- Species: T. tenebrosa

Binomial name
- Turdoides tenebrosa (Hartlaub, 1883)

= Dusky babbler =

Species of bird

The dusky babbler (Turdoides tenebrosa) is a species of bird in the family Leiothrichidae. It is found in Democratic Republic of the Congo, Ethiopia, Sudan, and Uganda. Its natural habitat is subtropical or tropical moist shrubland.
