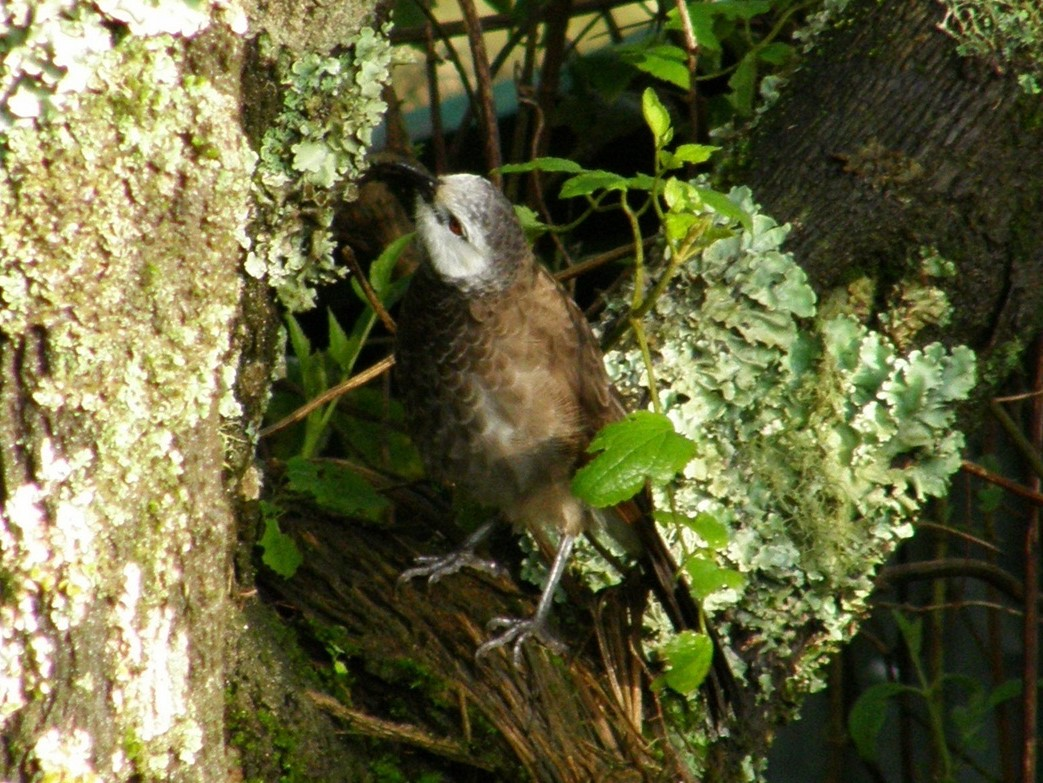

Conservation status
- Least Concern (IUCN 3.1)

Scientific classification
- Kingdom: Animalia
- Phylum: Chordata
- Class: Aves
- Order: Passeriformes
- Family: Leiothrichidae
- Genus: Turdoides
- Species: T. leucopygia

Binomial name
- Turdoides leucopygia (Rüppell, 1837)

= White-rumped babbler =

Species of bird

The white-rumped babbler (Turdoides leucopygia) is a species of bird in the family Leiothrichidae. It is found in Eritrea, Ethiopia, Somalia and South Sudan.

== Habitat ==
In the mountains of Degua Tembien, the species is found in bushland, scrubland and dense secondary forest, often near cliffs, gorges or water.
