= Chapin's babbler =

Conservation status
- Least Concern (IUCN 3.1)

Scientific classification
- Kingdom: Animalia
- Phylum: Chordata
- Class: Aves
- Order: Passeriformes
- Family: Leiothrichidae
- Genus: Turdoides
- Species: T. chapini

Binomial name
- Turdoides chapini (Schouteden, 1949)

Synonyms
- Kupeornis chapini

Species of bird

Chapin's babbler (Turdoides chapini) or Chapin's mountain-babbler, is a species of passerine bird in the family Leiothrichidae, endemic to the Democratic Republic of the Congo. It is native to the western foothills of the Albertine Rift montane forests. It is threatened by habitat loss.

The common name and the Latin binomial commemorate the American ornithologist James Paul Chapin.

Chapin's babbler was moved from the genus Kupeornis to Turdoides based on the results of a molecular phylogenetic study published in 2018.
