= Black-lored babbler =

- At Serengeti, Tanzania

Conservation status
- Least Concern (IUCN 3.1)

Scientific classification
- Kingdom: Animalia
- Phylum: Chordata
- Class: Aves
- Order: Passeriformes
- Family: Leiothrichidae
- Genus: Turdoides
- Species: T. sharpei

Binomial name
- Turdoides sharpei (Reichenow, 1891)

Species of bird

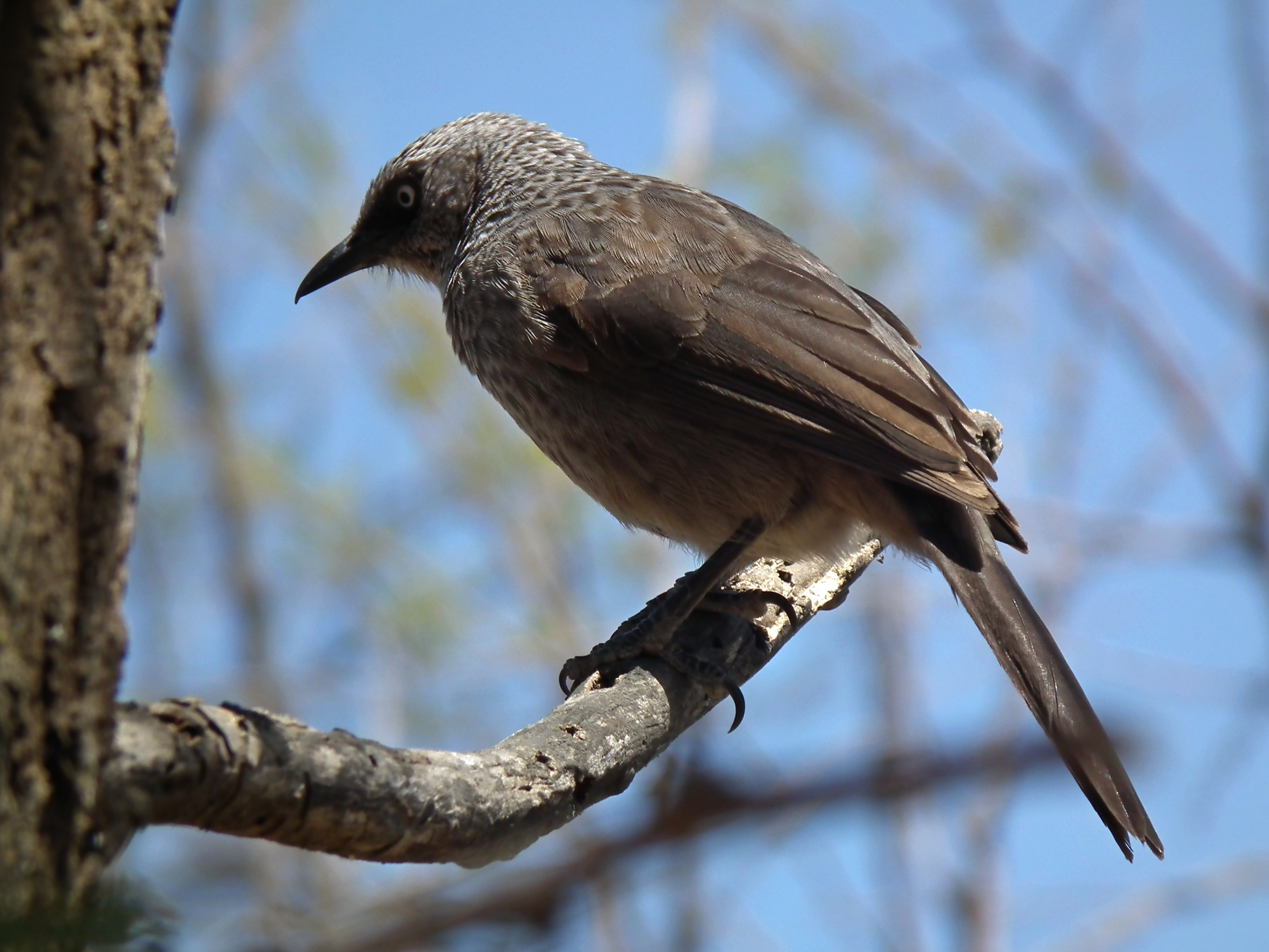
Perched on a branch, Tanzania

The black-lored babbler or Sharpe's pied-babbler (Turdoides sharpei) is a species of bird in the family Leiothrichidae. It is found in southwestern Kenya, Tanzania, Uganda, Burundi, Rwanda, and the part of the Democratic Republic of the Congo immediately adjacent to the three last-named countries. This bird was formerly considered the same species as Turdoides melanops of southern Africa, now known as the black-faced babbler.

These birds are mostly grey-brown with white mottling, especially on the underparts, that varies according to location and the individual. The population near Nanyuki, Kenya, is darker but can have a pure white chin or entire throat. The combination of pale yellow or white eyes and black lores (the areas between the eye and the bill) separates adults of this species from similar babblers except melanops, though all juvenile babblers have brown eyes.

In Kenya, single birds give repeated single or double harsh notes such as waaach or a muffled kurr-ack; pairs or groups give longer phrases in chorus. The tempo is frequently slow for a babbler. They are most vocal in the early morning and late afternoon.

Like other Turdoides, it is found low or on the ground in or near dense woody vegetation, including in cultivated areas. Kenyan birds forage in bushes and tall grass. They are "restless, noisy, and suspicious" and "typical gregarious babblers".

Single birds give repeated single or double harsh notes such as waaach or a muffled kurr-ack; pairs or groups give longer phrases in chorus. The tempo is frequently slow for a babbler. They are most vocal in the early morning and late afternoon.
