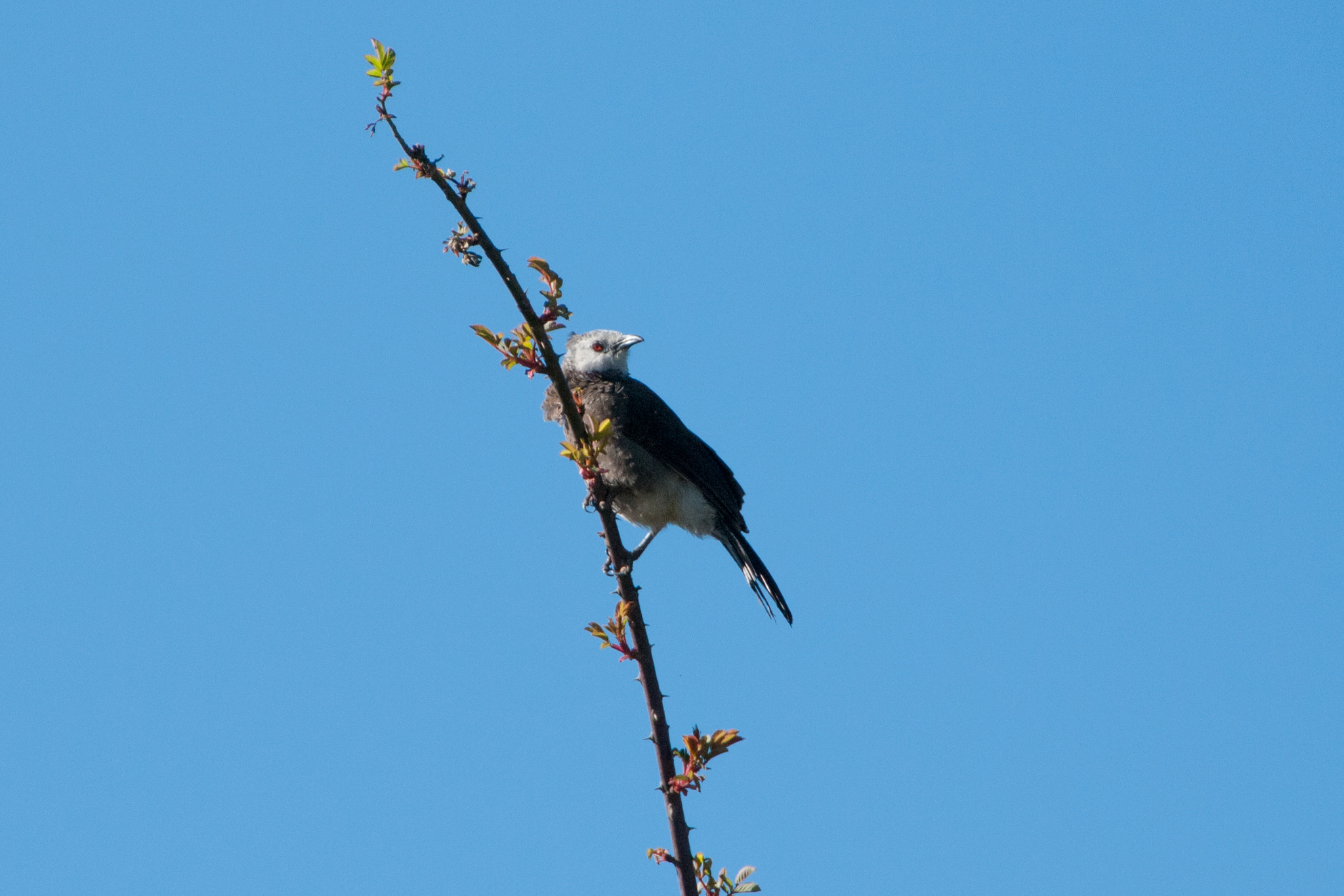

Conservation status
- Least Concern (IUCN 3.1)

Scientific classification
- Kingdom: Animalia
- Phylum: Chordata
- Class: Aves
- Order: Passeriformes
- Family: Leiothrichidae
- Genus: Turdoides
- Species: T. leucocephala

Binomial name
- Turdoides leucocephala Cretzschmar, 1826

= White-headed babbler =

Species of bird

The white-headed babbler or Cretzschmar's babbler (Turdoides leucocephala) is a species of bird in the family Leiothrichidae. It is found in Eritrea, Ethiopia, and Sudan. Its natural habitats are dry savanna and subtropical or tropical dry shrubland. Its name is sometimes confused with the yellow-billed babbler, which is alternatively called the white-headed babbler.

The name commemorates the German physician and scientist Philipp Jakob Cretzschmar who founded the Senckenberg Natural History Museum.
