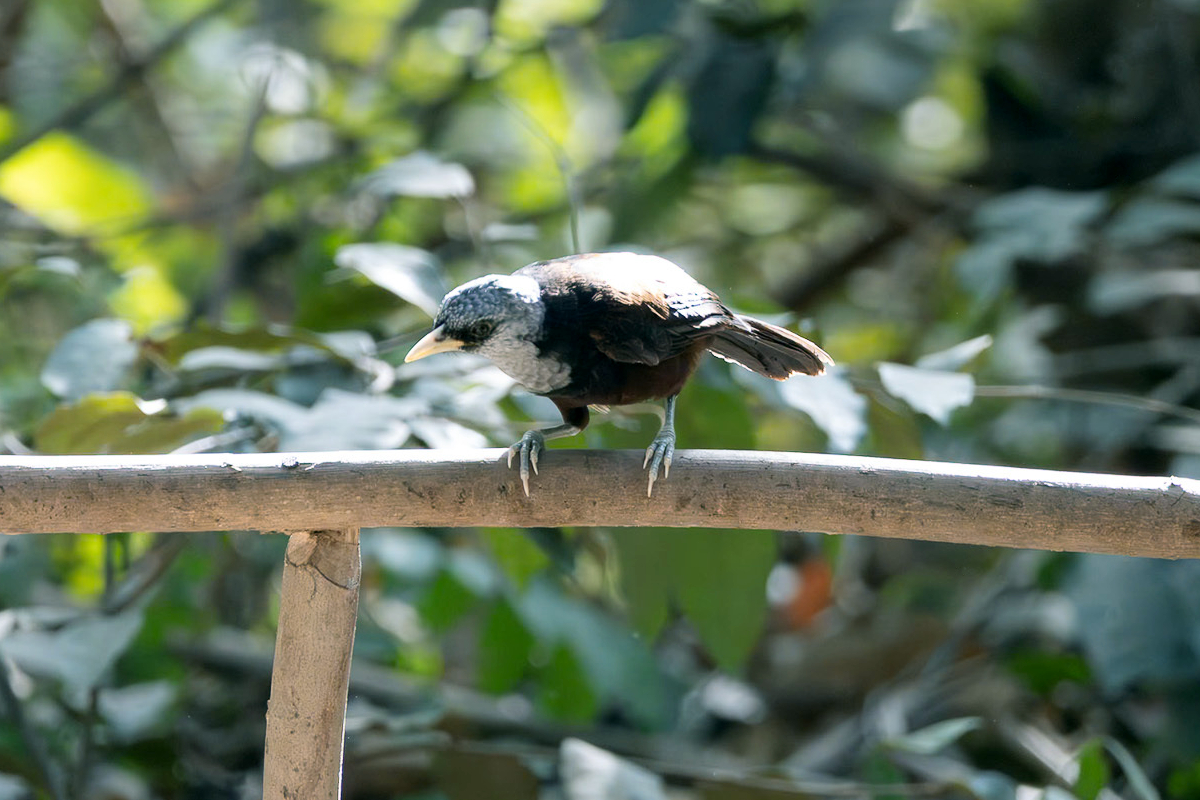

Scientific classification
- Kingdom: Animalia
- Phylum: Chordata
- Class: Aves
- Order: Passeriformes
- Family: Leiothrichidae
- Genus: Turdoides
- Species: T. atripennis

Binomial name
- Turdoides atripennis (Swainson, 1837)

Synonyms
- Crateropus haynesi Phyllanthus atripennis

= Capuchin babbler =

Species of bird

The capuchin babbler (Turdoides atripennis) is a species of bird in the family Leiothrichidae.

Its natural habitat is subtropical or tropical moist lowland forest. It has a disjunct range across the western and northern parts of the African tropical rainforest.

The capuchin babbler was moved from the monotypic genus Phyllanthus to Turdoides based on the results of a molecular phylogenetic study published in 2018.
