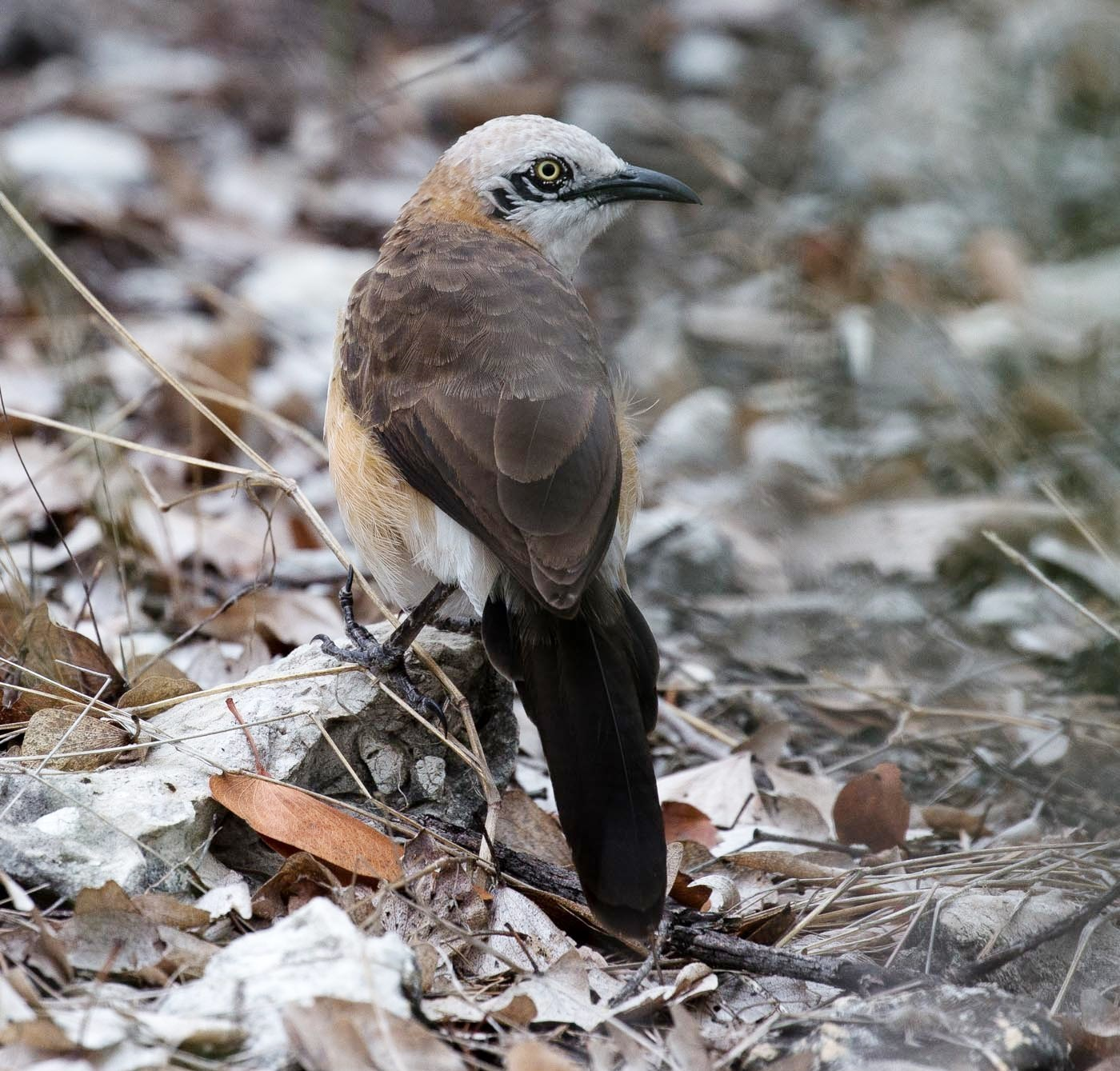
- An individual in woodland at Ongava Game Reserve in Kunene Region

Conservation status
- Least Concern (IUCN 3.1)

Scientific classification
- Kingdom: Animalia
- Phylum: Chordata
- Class: Aves
- Order: Passeriformes
- Family: Leiothrichidae
- Genus: Turdoides
- Species: T. gymnogenys

Binomial name
- Turdoides gymnogenys (Hartlaub, 1865)

Synonyms
- Aethocichla gymnogenis Sharpe, 1883

= Bare-cheeked babbler =

Species of bird

The bare-cheeked babbler (Turdoides gymnogenys) is a passerine bird in the family Leiothrichidae and is native to arid savannas of southwestern Africa, specifically northwestern Namibia and southwestern Angola. It is known for its brown feathers and the bare skin on its cheeks. The species is listed as Least Concern by the International Union for Conservation of Nature and is a commonly found local bird.

== Taxonomy and systematics ==
The species was first described in 1865 by Gustav Hartlaub as Crateropus gymnogenys and later reassigned to Turdoides. It is classified to the family Leiothrichidae, known as the laughingthrushes and allies, which is a group recognized for its social living and unique vocals. The bare-cheeked babbler is identified as having two different species, gymnogenys in Angola and kaokensis in Namibia but most authorities regard the species as one due to minimal variation.

== Description ==
Adults measure 23–25 cm (9–10 in) in length and weigh roughly 60–70 g (2.1–2.5 oz). Their upperparts are a medium brown, have gray or white underparts, and a light gray crown. The bare bluish gray facial skin on the cheeks and the yellow eyes are the most distinctive features. They have a bill that is dark and slightly curved for searching through litter and soil. The sexes hold a similar appearance. The juveniles have duller colors and less prominent facial skin patches than that of the adults.

== Distribution and habitat ==
This species is near-endemic to southwestern Africa and is confined mainly to northwestern Namibia and bordering parts of Angola. It favors Mopane woodlands, dry thorn scrub, and rocky semi-desert up to about 1,500 m (4,900 ft) elevation. The bare-cheeked babbler is non-migratory as it maintains permanent territories and resides year-round in family groups. In Namibia, it is especially common in the Kunene Region and Etosha National Park.

== Behavior and ecology ==
Bare-cheeked babblers live in family groups of 6–12 birds. They are highly vocal, they produce harsh "babbles" that help maintain group cohesion and defend territories. They forage on the ground looking through leaf litter for insects, spiders, and small arthropods. They occasionally are seen eating seeds and berries in the dry season. Groups coordinate defense against predators through calls and mobbing behavior.

== Breeding ==
Breeding takes place during the rainy season (November–January). Nests are cup-shaped, made of coarse grass and plant fibers, and placed 1–3 m (3–10 ft) above ground in dense shrubs or Mopane trees. Clutches usually contain 2–4 eggs. Cooperative breeding is typical, the older offspring will watch the newly hatched offspring until they are old enough to defend themselves.

== Conservation status ==
The IUCN classifies the species as Least Concern. They have a stable population and have a large range. Their main threats include overgrazing and habitat loss, but much of its habitat lies in protected areas, supporting long-term stability.
