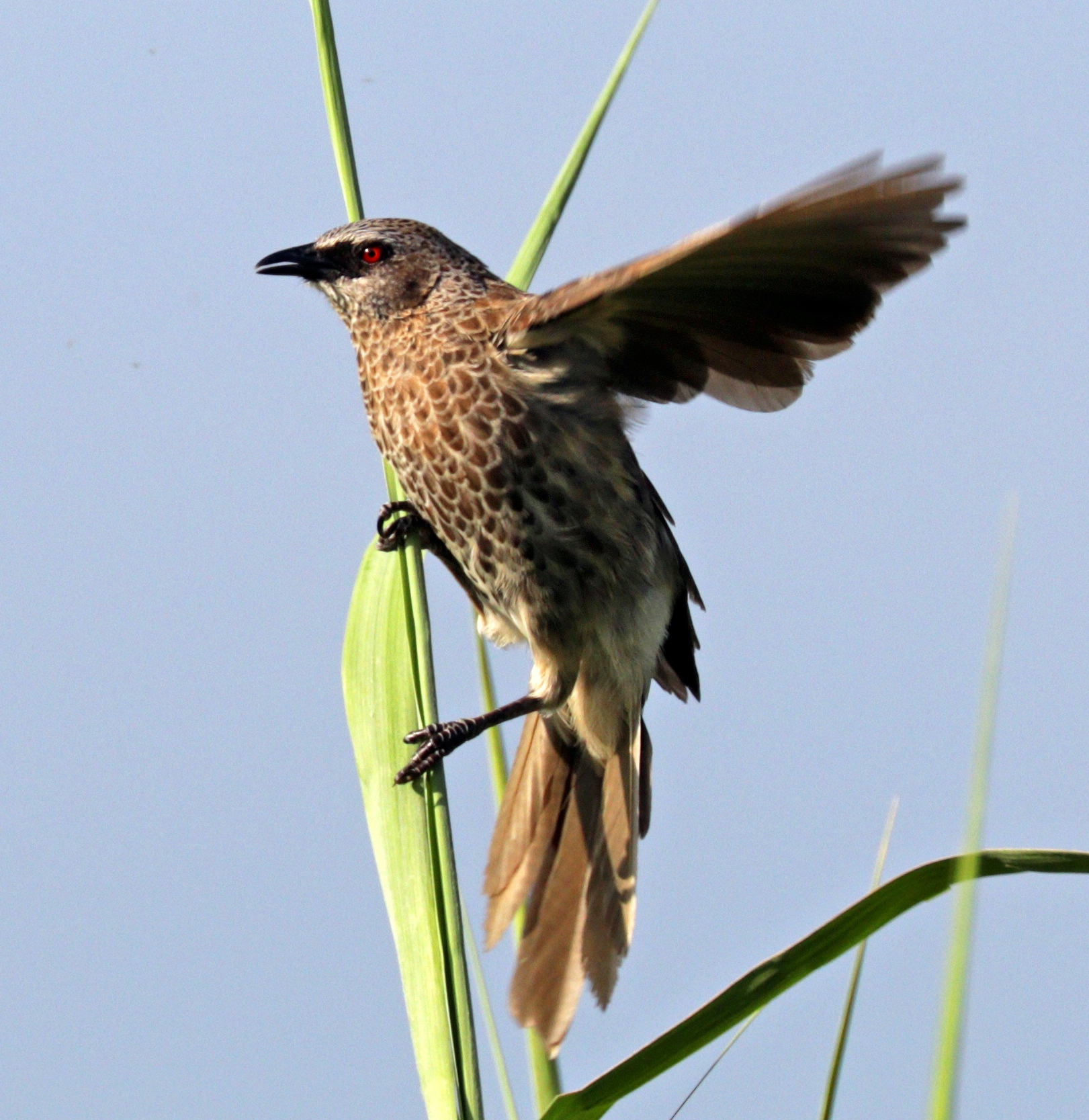
- In a wetland in the Matetsi Safari; Area of western Zimbabwe

Conservation status
- Least Concern (IUCN 3.1)

Scientific classification
- Kingdom: Animalia
- Phylum: Chordata
- Class: Aves
- Order: Passeriformes
- Family: Leiothrichidae
- Genus: Turdoides
- Species: T. hartlaubii

Binomial name
- Turdoides hartlaubii (Barboza du Bocage, 1868)

= Hartlaub's babbler =

Species of bird

Hartlaub's babbler (Turdoides hartlaubii) or the Angola babbler, is a species of bird in the family Leiothrichidae, which is native to south central Africa. The common name and Latin binomial commemorate the German physician and ornithologist Gustav Hartlaub.

== Range ==
The species is found in Angola, Botswana, Burundi, DRC, Namibia, Rwanda, Tanzania, Zambia, and Zimbabwe.

== Gallery ==
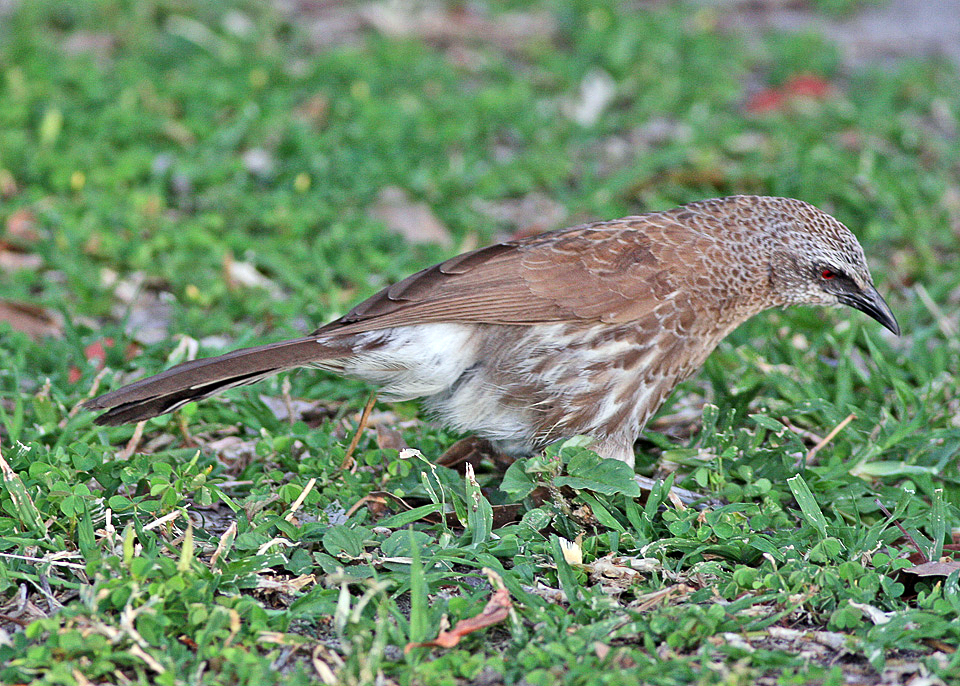
In a garden at Shakawe, Botswana, showing white vent plumage

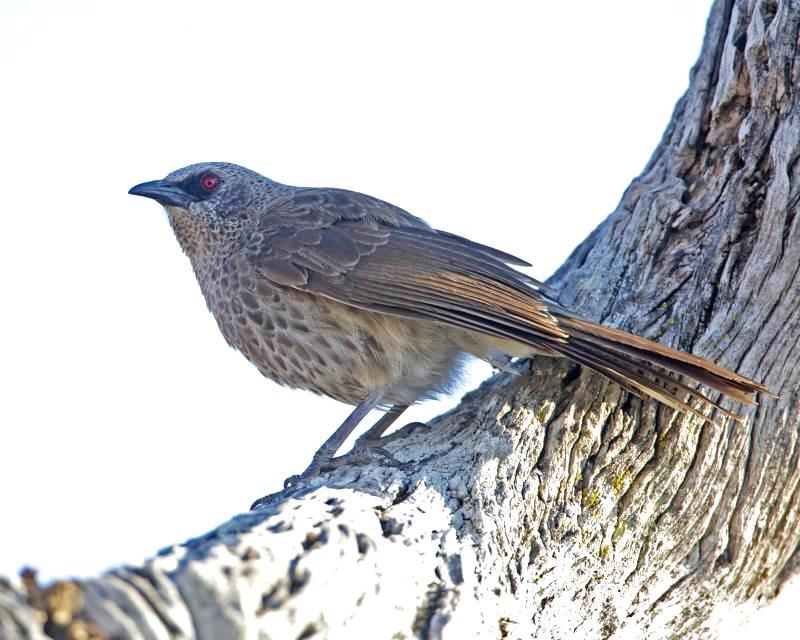
Perched in woodland at Moremi, Botswana

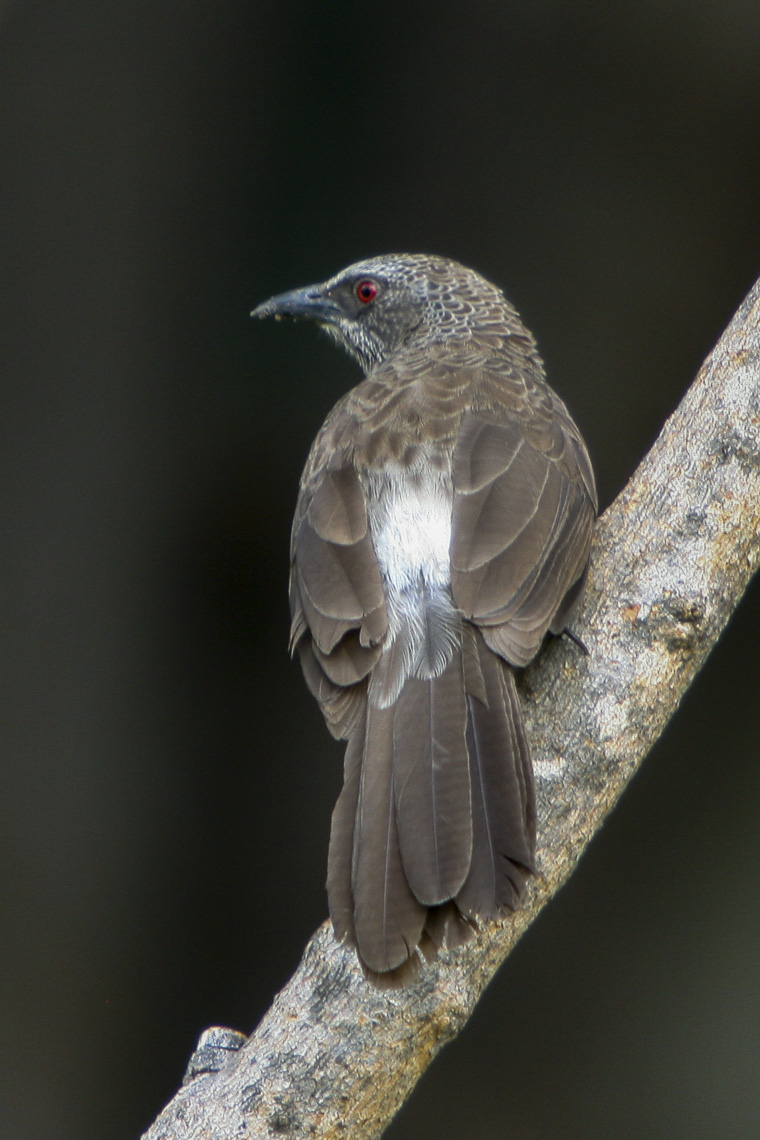
View of the white rump plumage
