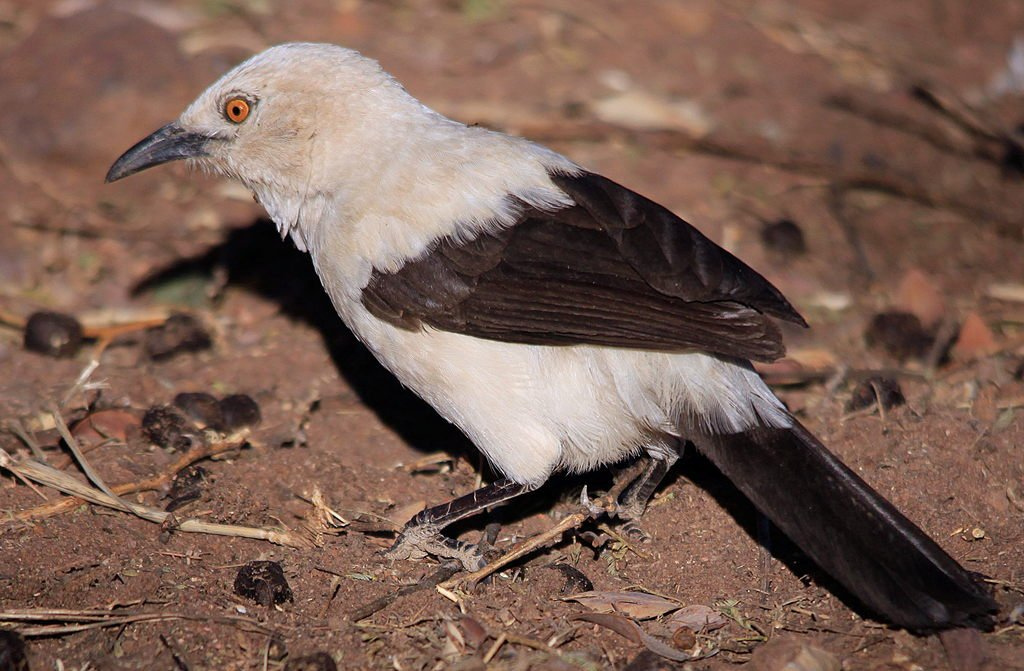
- At Marakele N. P., South Africa

Conservation status
- Least Concern (IUCN 3.1)

Scientific classification
- Kingdom: Animalia
- Phylum: Chordata
- Class: Aves
- Order: Passeriformes
- Family: Leiothrichidae
- Genus: Turdoides
- Species: T. bicolor

Binomial name
- Turdoides bicolor (Jardine, 1831)

= Southern pied babbler =

Species of bird

The southern pied babbler (Turdoides bicolor) is a species of bird in the family Leiothrichidae, found in dry savannah of Botswana, Namibia, South Africa, and Zimbabwe.

== Description ==
The southern pied babbler is a medium-sized 75 to 95 grams (2.6 to 3.4 oz) cooperatively breeding passerine bird. Groups range in size from 2-16 adults, but pairs are rare. The species is sexually monomorphic, with males and females indistinguishable from physical characteristics. Each group comprises a dominant breeding pair that monopolise access to breeding opportunities. Recent genetic research has confirmed that these dominant pairs are responsible for more than 95% of young hatched. Occasional mixed parentage has been observed, but is predictable in most cases: subordinates primarily gain parentage when a new (unrelated) immigrant disperses into the group, or a new group is founded. All group members cooperate to help raise the young hatched from a single clutch. Clutch size varies between two and five, with a modal clutch size of three.

Cooperative behaviours include: provisioning young (both in the nest and post-fledging), sentinel behaviour, territory border defense, teaching behaviour and babysitting behaviour (where semi-independent fledglings follow adults between foraging sites and away from predators). The breeding season extends from late-September to early April, although this varies between years and is strongly rain-dependent. Groups can raise up to three successful clutches per breeding season. Average incubation time is 14 days, and average time between hatching and fledging is 16 days. Fledging time varies according to group size: small groups tend to fledge their young earlier than large groups. Post-fledging, young are poorly mobile, unable to fly, and rely entirely on adult group members for food. Fledgling foraging efficiency develops slowly, and fledglings can continue to be provisioned by adults for up to four months post-fledging. The amount of care that young receive during this stage has long-term effects: fledglings that receive care for the longest periods tend to be heavier and better foragers than their counterparts. In addition, they are more likely to successfully disperse from their natal group and consequently begin reproducing earlier than their "failed-disperser" counterparts.

== Behaviour ==
Aggression toward fledglings is most commonly observed when the dominant pair have begun to incubate another brood. During this period, begging fledglings will be punished by parents using aggressive behaviour such as jumping on the youngster. In all cases, fledglings stop begging immediately following attack. Brood overlap results in a distinctive division of labour, with subordinate adults continuing to care for fledglings while the dominant pair concentrate their effort on the new brood. Owing to the extended period of post-fledging care in this species, this can result in dependent young from multiple broods being raised simultaneously.

Pied babblers are strongly territorial, and defend their borders using wing and vocal displays on a near daily basis. These fights rarely lead to physical aggression and injury from such fights is very rare. Groups defend the same territory year-round and small groups tend to lose portions of their territory to larger neighbouring groups.

Research on pied babblers has provided the first evidence of teaching behaviour in an avian species. Pied babblers teach their young by giving a specific purr call each time they deliver food. Young learn to associate this call with food and reach out of the nest each time they hear it. Adults exploit this association to encourage young to fledge by giving the purr call at a distance from the nest, enticing young to follow them. Post-fledging, adults continue to use the call to encourage young to move between foraging areas or away from predators. This call is also used to recruit independent fledglings to a rich foraging site, and may thus provide young with information on where to forage to locate rich food sources.

Research on pied babblers reveals that temperatures exceeding 38 °C compared to moderate, more normal ones of 23 °C, can halve their ability to learn associations, research which its authors suggest raises another factor about climate change that will impact on wildlife survival.

Research on pied babblers has also provided evidence of task partitioning behaviour. In this species, the dominant pair are able to leave their dependent young in the care of helpers and initiate a new brood. This allows brood overlap: several broods of dependent young can be raised at the same time. Such a behaviour highlights the benefits of cooperative breeding: many helpers allow breeders to invest in more broods. Parents initiate this task partitioning by aggressively punishing offspring that beg at them for food. This repeated punishment results in young fledglings begging for food from helpers rather than their parents: freeing up their parents to breed again.

== Interspecific interactions ==
Pied babblers have a complex interspecific interaction with the kleptoparasitic fork-tailed drongo, Dicrurus adsimilis. Drongos perch above and follow babbler groups between foraging sites and give alarm calls each time a predator is seen. When drongos are present, babblers invest less time in sentinel behaviour. However, drongos occasionally give false alarm calls and then swoop down to steal the food items that the foraging babblers have dropped upon hearing an alarm call. To avoid the cost of kleptoparasitism, large babbler groups, which have enough group members to participate in sentinel behaviour, do not tolerate drongos and aggressively chase them away from the group. Consequently, they suffer very few losses to kleptoparasitic attack. However, small groups do not have enough group members to provide sentinel behaviour without affecting time invested in other behaviours such as foraging or provisioning young. These groups therefore tolerate occasional kleptoparasitic attacks in return for the sentinel duties that drongos provide.

Young pied babblers have difficulty handling larger food items such as scorpions, skinks and solifuges, and take a lot longer to break these food items down than adults. This makes them ideal victims for attacks by fork-tailed drongos: research has revealed that drongos specifically target young babblers for kleptoparasitic attacks and gain greater foraging success by doing so.

== The Pied Babbler Research Project ==
The Pied Babbler Research Project was established by Dr Amanda Ridley in 2003 for the purpose of studying many aspects of cooperative breeding behaviour over the long-term. The population comprises fully habituated groups of wild pied babblers. The average number of groups in the population varies between 10 and 18 each year. Research is conducted continuously by scientists and postgraduate students and involves investigations into population dynamics, the causes and consequences of helping behaviour, sexual selection, foraging ecology, interspecific interactions, vocal communication, parent-offspring conflict, kin recognition, maternal effects, physiology and reproductive conflict.

== Inbreeding avoidance ==
Individuals appear to avoid inbreeding in two ways. The first is through dispersal, and the second is by avoiding familiar group members as mates. Although both males and females disperse locally, they move outside the range within which genetically related individuals are likely to be encountered. Within their group, individuals only acquire breeding positions when the opposite-sex breeder is unrelated. In general, inbreeding is avoided because it leads to a reduction in progeny fitness (inbreeding depression) due largely to the homozygous expression of deleterious recessive alleles.

== Gallery ==
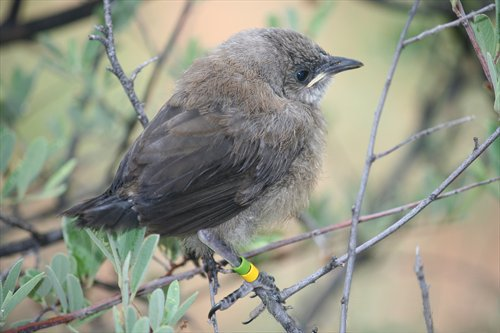
Pied babblers fledge their young when they are still unable to fly.

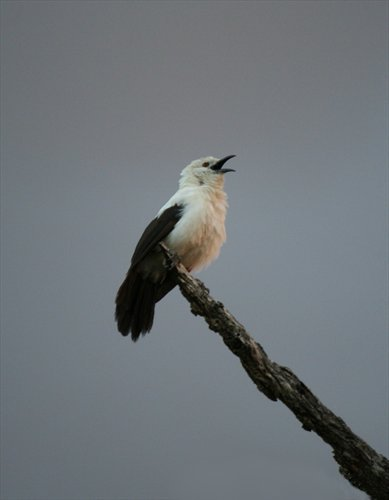
Pied babblers display cooperative sentinel behaviour, with individuals foregoing foraging to act as watchmen for the rest of the group. This is usually done high up in exposed locations. When they spot a predator they give alarm calls to alert the rest of the group to the type of threat.

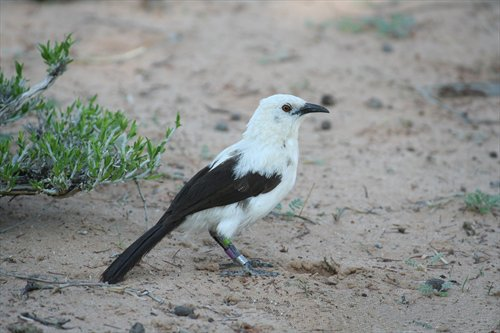
Pied babbler adults have a white head and body with dark brown rectrices and remiges.

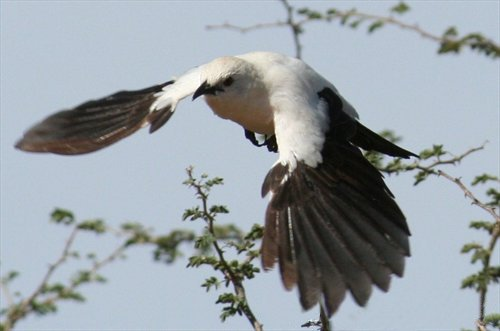
In flight

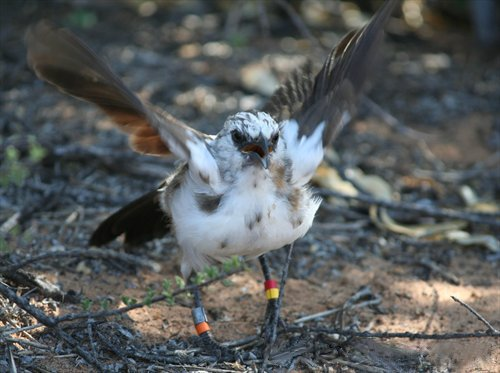
Pied babbler fledglings form short-term associations with foraging adults, where they follow and beg to gain food. Fledglings occasionally fight with their siblings over access to an adult.

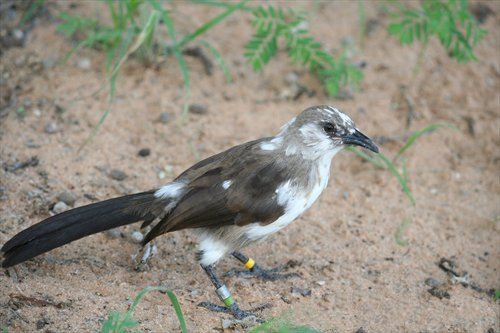
Pied babblers initially fledge with completely brown plumage, this slowly moults and fledglings have a mottled appearance before they gain full adult plumage.

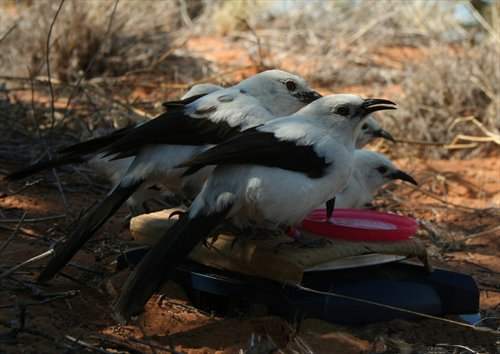
Pied babbler group

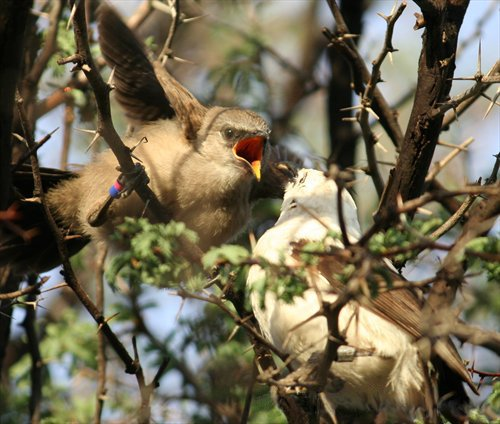
All members of a pied babbler group help to provision offspring produced by a single dominant pair.

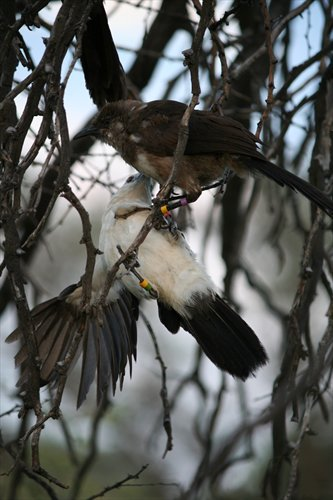
Pied babblers have ample leisure time which they fill with games of chasing, hanging upside down, play-fighting and jumping on each other.

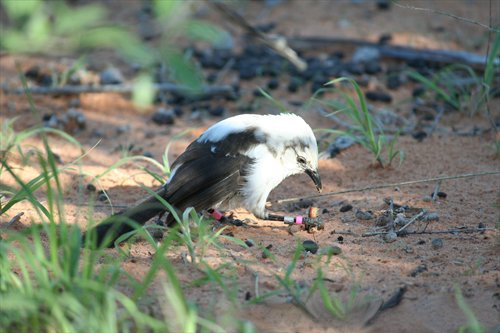
Pied babblers spend >90% of their foraging time on the ground. Their diet consists mainly of invertebrates, which they either glean from the surface or dig up.
