= Philipp Jakob Cretzschmar =

German physician and natural scientist

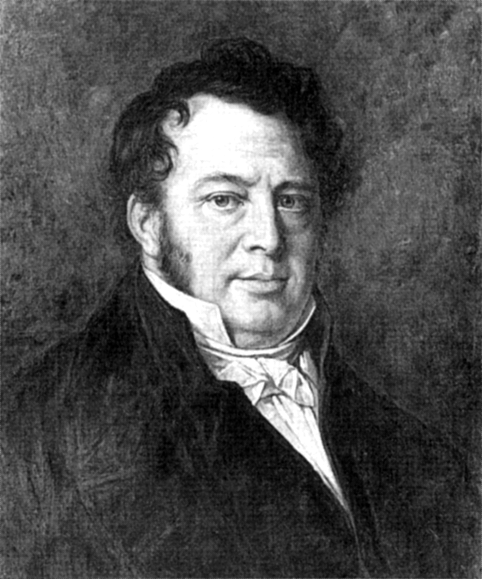
- Born: 11 June 1786; Sulzbach, Hesse, Germany
- Died: 4 May 1845 (aged 58); Frankfurt-am-Main
- Education: University of Würzburg
- Known for: Describing about thirty new species, Atlas zu der Reise im nördlichen Afrika
- Scientific career
- Fields: Physician, ornithologist, mammalogist
- Workplaces: Senckenberg Natural History Society
- Author abbrev. (zoology): Cretzschmar

Philipp Jakob Cretzschmar (11 June 1786 – 4 May 1845) was a German medical doctor and natural scientist.

Cretzschmar was born at Sulzbach and studied medicine at the University of Würzburg. He taught anatomy and zoology at the Senckenberg Medical Institute of Frankfurt. He died in Frankfurt-am-Main.

Cretzschmar was the founder and second director of the Senckenberg Natural History Society in 1817. One of the founding members of the society was Eduard Rüppell, and the two men collaborated in publishing the results of Rüppell's explorations in Africa. The Atlas zu der Reise im nördlichen Afrika ("Atlas of Rüppell's Travels in Northern Africa"; 1826–31) included an ornithological section by Cretzschmar describing around thirty new species, including Meyer's parrot, Nubian bustard, Goliath heron, streaked scrub warbler and Cretzschmar's bunting. In the field of mammalogy, he is the binomial author of the scimitar-horned oryx and Soemmerring's gazelle.

The "Cretzschmar-Medaille" is an award offered by the Senckenberg foundation for outstanding work in natural sciences.
