= List of birds of the Gambia =

This is a list of the bird species recorded in The Gambia. The avifauna of The Gambia include a total of 621 species, two of which have been introduced. The country, which is very small and almost completely surrounded by Senegal, has no endemic species.

This list's taxonomic treatment (designation and sequence of orders, families and species) and nomenclature (English and scientific names) are those of The Clements Checklist of Birds of the World, 2022 edition.

The following tags have been used to highlight several categories. Not all species will fall into one of these categories. Those that do not are commonly occurring native species.

- (A) Accidental - a species that rarely or accidentally occurs in the Gambia
- (I) Introduced - a species introduced to the Gambia as a consequence, direct or indirect, of human actions
- (Ex) Extirpated - a species that no longer occurs in the Gambia although populations exist elsewhere

== Ducks, geese, and waterfowl ==
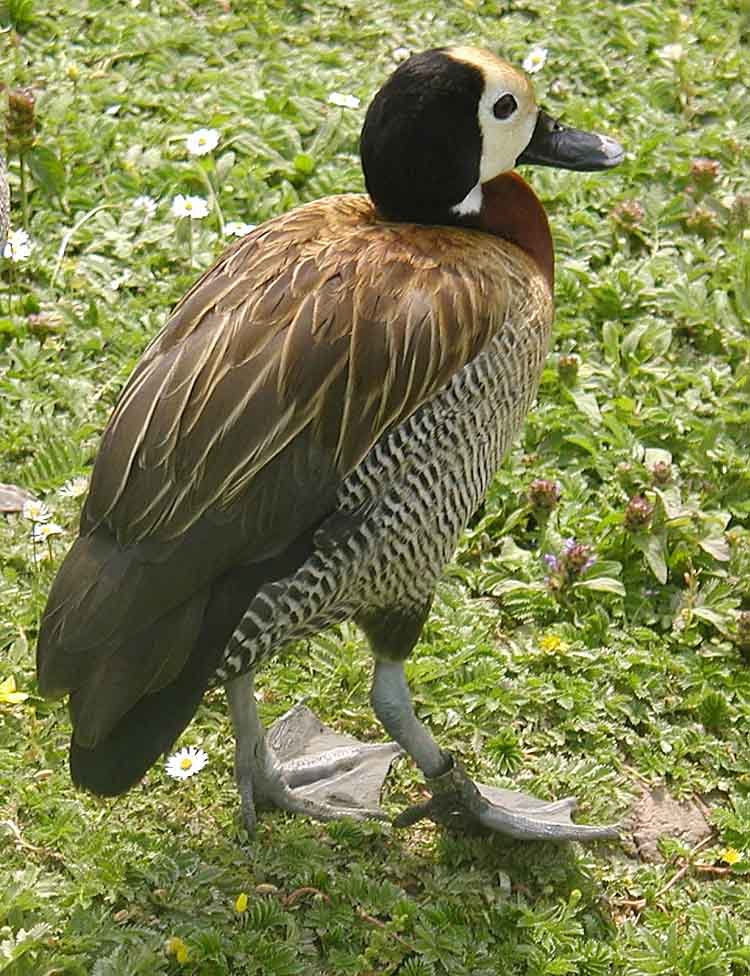
The white-faced whistling duck is the country's most common and widespread duck.

Order: Anseriformes Family: Anatidae

Anatidae includes the ducks and most duck-like waterfowl, such as geese and swans. These birds are adapted to an aquatic existence with webbed feet, flattened bills, and feathers that are excellent at shedding water due to an oily coating.

- White-faced whistling-duck, Dendrocygna viduata
- Fulvous whistling-duck, Dendrocygna bicolor
- White-backed duck, Thalassornis leuconotus
- Knob-billed duck, Sarkidiornis melanotos
- Egyptian goose, Alopochen aegyptiacus
- Spur-winged goose, Plectropterus gambensis
- African pygmy-goose, Nettapus auritus
- Garganey, Spatula querquedula
- Northern shoveler, Spatula clypeata
- Gadwall, Mareca strepera (A)
- Eurasian wigeon, Mareca penelope (A)
- American wigeon, Mareca americana (A)
- Northern pintail, Anas acuta
- Green-winged teal, Anas crecca
- Common pochard, Aythya ferina (A)
- Ferruginous duck, Aythya nyroca
- Tufted duck, Aythya fuligula

== Guineafowl ==
Order: Galliformes Family: Numididae

Guineafowl are a group of African, seed-eating, ground-nesting birds that resemble partridges, but with featherless heads and spangled grey plumage.

- Helmeted guineafowl, Numida meleagris

== New World quail ==
Order: Galliformes Family: Odontophoridae

Despite their family's common name, this species and one other are native to Africa.

- Stone partridge, Ptilopachus petrosus

== Pheasants, grouse, and allies ==
Order: Galliformes Family: Phasianidae

The Phasianidae are a family of terrestrial birds which consists of quails, snowcocks, francolins, spurfowls, tragopans, monals, pheasants, peafowls, and jungle fowls. In general, they are plump (although they vary in size) and have broad, relatively short wings.

- White-throated francolin, Campocolinus albogularis
- Common quail, Coturnix coturnix
- Ahanta francolin, Pternistis ahantensis
- Double-spurred francolin, Pternistis bicalcaratus

== Flamingos ==
Order: Phoenicopteriformes Family: Phoenicopteridae

Flamingos are wading birds, usually 3 to 5 feet (0.9 to 1.5 m) tall, found in both the Western and Eastern Hemispheres. Flamingos filter-feed on shellfish and algae. Their oddly shaped beaks are specially adapted to separate mud and silt from the food they consume and, uniquely, are used upside-down.

- Greater flamingo, Phoenicopterus roseus
- Lesser flamingo, Phoenicopterus minor

== Grebes ==
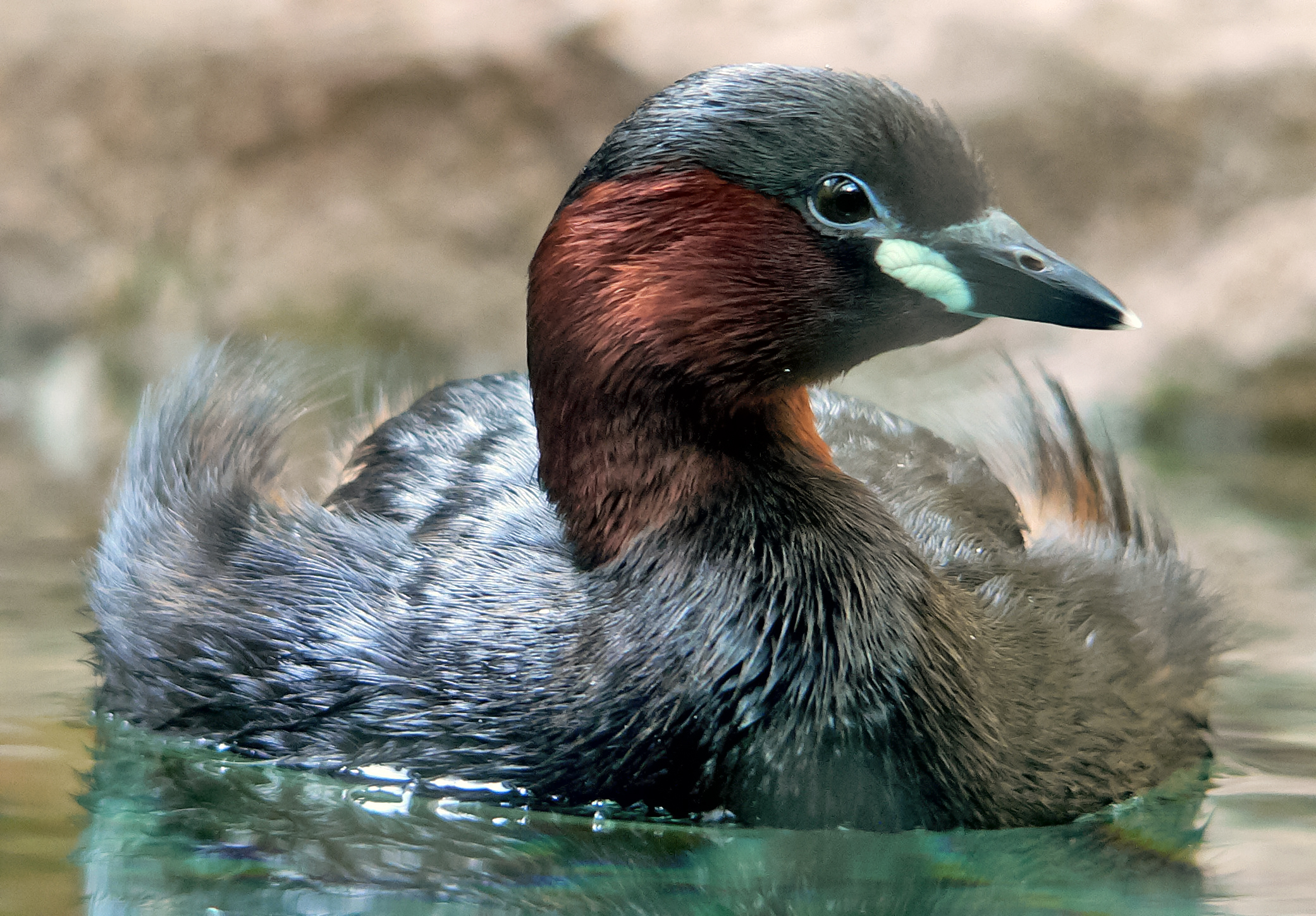
Little grebes are locally common in freshwater ponds, creeks and rice fields, particularly in the Western Division.

Order: Podicipediformes Family: Podicipedidae

Grebes are small to medium-sized diving birds. They breed on fresh water, but often visit the sea whilst migrating and in winter. They have lobed toes and are excellent swimmers and divers; however, their feet are placed far back on their bodies, making them quite ungainly on land.

- Little grebe, Tachybaptus ruficollis
- Eared grebe, Podiceps nigricollis (A)

== Pigeons and doves ==
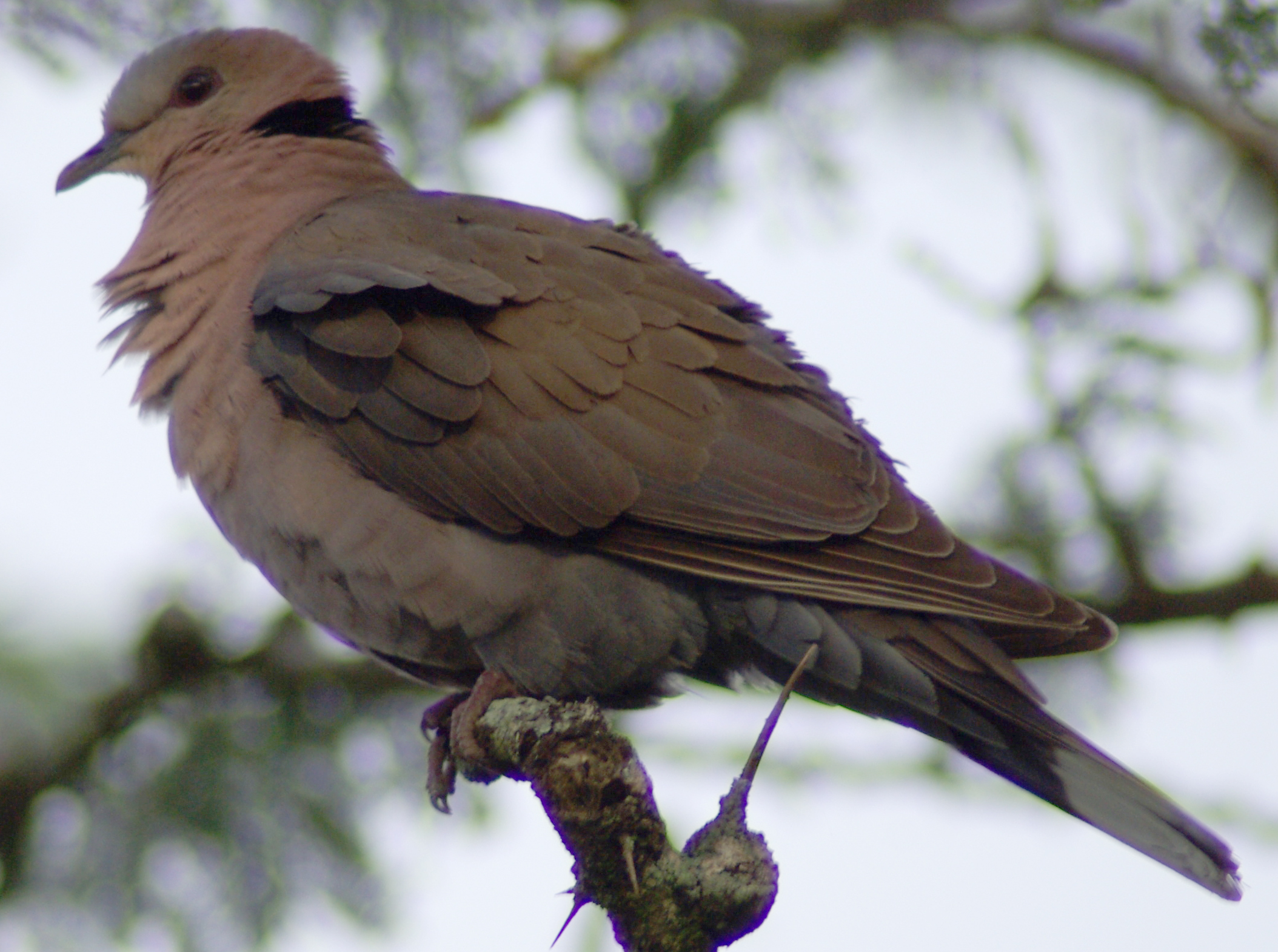
Red-eyed dove (Streptopelia semitorquata)

Order: Columbiformes Family: Columbidae

Pigeons and doves are stout-bodied birds with short necks and short slender bills with a fleshy cere.

- Rock pigeon, Columba livia
- Speckled pigeon, Columba guinea
- European turtle-dove, Streptopelia turtur
- Adamawa turtle-dove, Streptopelia hypopyrrha (A)
- African collared-dove, Streptopelia roseogrisea
- Mourning collared-dove, Streptopelia decipiens
- Red-eyed dove, Streptopelia semitorquata
- Vinaceous dove, Streptopelia vinacea
- Laughing dove, Streptopelia senegalensis
- Black-billed wood-dove, Turtur abyssinicus
- Blue-spotted wood-dove, Turtur afer
- Tambourine dove, Turtur tympanistria
- Namaqua dove, Oena capensis
- Bruce's green-pigeon, Treron waalia
- African green-pigeon, Treron calva

== Sandgrouse ==
Order: Pterocliformes Family: Pteroclidae

Sandgrouse have small pigeon-like heads and necks, but sturdy compact bodies. They have long pointed wings and sometimes tails and a fast direct flight. Flocks fly to watering holes at dawn and dusk. Their legs are feathered down to the toes.

- Chestnut-bellied sandgrouse, Pterocles exustus (A)
- Four-banded sandgrouse, Pterocles quadricinctus

== Bustards ==
Order: Otidiformes Family: Otidae

Bustards are large terrestrial birds mainly associated with dry open country and steppes in the Old World. They are omnivorous and nest on the ground. They walk steadily on strong legs and big toes, pecking for food as they go. They have long broad wings with "fingered" wingtips and striking patterns in flight. Many have interesting mating displays.

- Arabian bustard, Ardeotis arabs (A)
- Denham's bustard, Neotis denhami
- White-bellied bustard, Eupodotis senegalensis (A)
- Savile's bustard, Lophotis savilei
- Black-bellied bustard, Lissotis melanogaster

== Turacos ==
Order: Musophagiformes Family: Musophagidae

The turacos, plantain-eaters, and go-away-birds make up the family Musophagidae. They are medium-sized arboreal birds. The turacos and plantain-eaters are brightly coloured, usually in blue, green, or purple. The go-away-birds are mostly grey and white.

- Guinea turaco, Tauraco persa
- Violet turaco, Musophaga violacea
- Western plantain-eater, Crinifer piscator

== Cuckoos ==
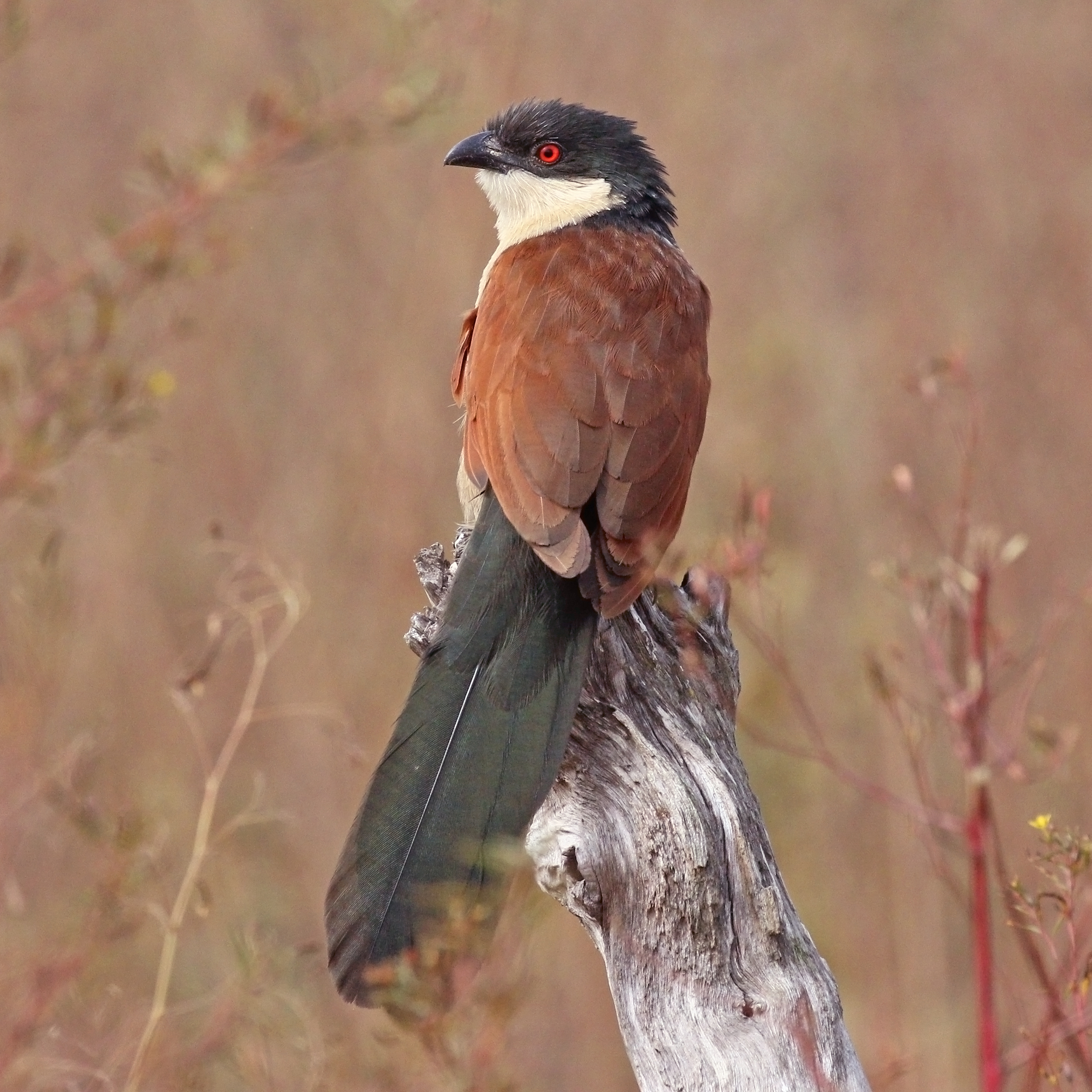
Senegal coucal (Centropus senegalensis)

Order: Cuculiformes Family: Cuculidae

The family Cuculidae includes cuckoos, roadrunners, and anis. These birds are of variable size with slender bodies, long tails, and strong legs. The Old World cuckoos are brood parasites.

- Senegal coucal, Centropus senegalensis
- Black coucal, Centropus grillii
- Blue malkoha, Ceuthmochares aereus
- Great spotted cuckoo, Clamator glandarius
- Levaillant's cuckoo, Clamator levaillantii
- Pied cuckoo, Clamator jacobinus
- Dideric cuckoo, Chrysococcyx caprius
- Klaas's cuckoo, Chrysococcyx klaas
- African emerald cuckoo, Chrysococcyx cupreus (A)
- Black cuckoo, Cuculus clamosus (A)
- Red-chested cuckoo, Cuculus solitarius
- African cuckoo, Cuculus gularis
- Common cuckoo, Cuculus canorus

== Nightjars and allies ==
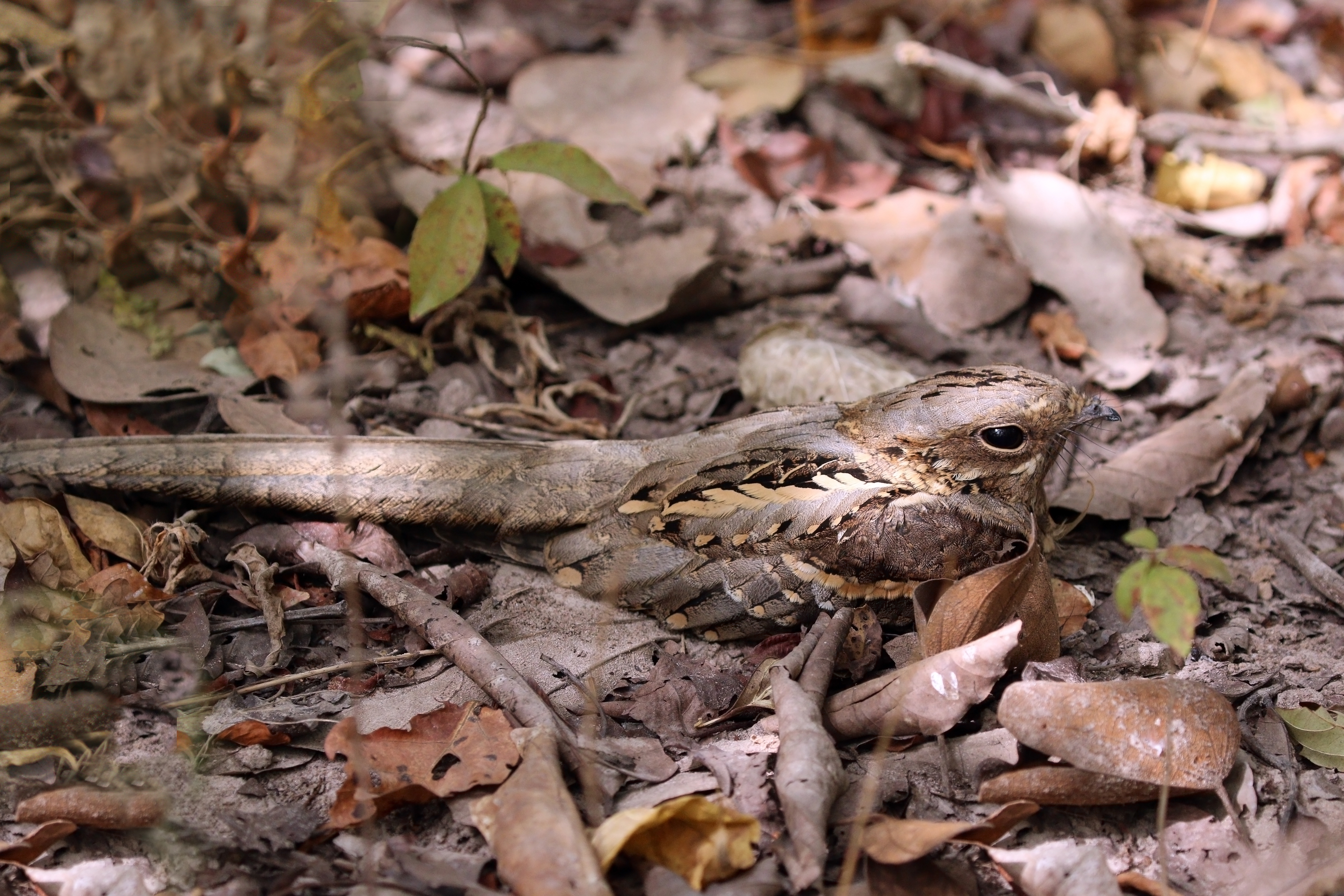
Long-tailed nightjar (Caprimulgus climacurus climacurus) male

Order: Caprimulgiformes Family: Caprimulgidae

Nightjars are medium-sized nocturnal birds that usually nest on the ground. They have long wings, short legs, and very short bills. Most have small feet, of little use for walking, and long pointed wings. Their soft plumage is camouflaged to resemble bark or leaves.

- Pennant-winged nightjar, Caprimulgus vexillarius (A)
- Standard-winged nightjar, Caprimulgus longipennis
- Red-necked nightjar, Caprimulgus ruficollis
- Eurasian nightjar, Caprimulgus europaeus
- Egyptian nightjar, Caprimulgus aegyptius
- Fiery-necked nightjar, Caprimulgus pectoralis
- Swamp nightjar, Caprimulgus natalensis (A)
- Plain nightjar, Caprimulgus inornatus
- Long-tailed nightjar, Caprimulgus climacurus

== Swifts ==
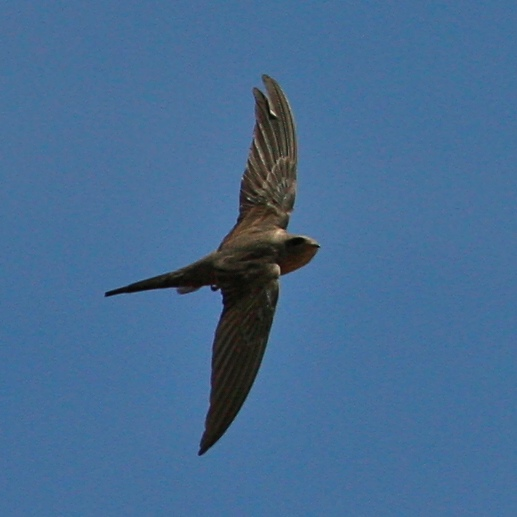
African palm-swift (Cypsiurus parvus)

Order: Caprimulgiformes Family: Apodidae

Swifts are small birds which spend the majority of their lives flying. These birds have very short legs and never settle voluntarily on the ground, perching instead only on vertical surfaces. Many swifts have long swept-back wings which resemble a crescent or boomerang.

- Mottled spinetail, Telacanthura ussheri
- Alpine swift, Apus melba (A)
- Common swift, Apus apus
- Pallid swift, Apus pallidus
- Little swift, Apus affinis
- White-rumped swift, Apus caffer (A)
- African palm-swift, Cypsiurus parvus

== Flufftails ==
Order: Gruiformes Family: Sarothruridae

The flufftails are a small family of ground-dwelling birds found only in Madagascar and sub-Saharan Africa.

- White-spotted flufftail, Sarothrura pulchra

== Rails, gallinules, and coots ==
Order: Gruiformes Family: Rallidae

Rallidae is a large family of small to medium-sized birds which includes the rails, crakes, coots, and gallinules. Typically they inhabit dense vegetation in damp environments near lakes, swamps, or rivers. In general they are shy and secretive birds, making them difficult to observe. Most species have strong legs and long toes which are well adapted to soft uneven surfaces. They tend to have short, rounded wings and to be weak fliers.

- African rail, Rallus caerulescens (A)
- African crake, Crex egregia
- Spotted crake, Porzana porzana (A)
- Lesser moorhen, Paragallinula angulata
- Eurasian moorhen, Gallinula chloropus
- Eurasian coot, Fulica atra (A)
- Allen's gallinule, Porphyrio alleni
- African swamphen, Porphyrio madagascariensis
- Black crake, Zapornia flavirostris
- Little crake, Zapornia parva (A)
- Baillon's crake, Zapornia pusilla (A)

== Finfoots ==
Order: Gruiformes Family: Heliornithidae

Heliornithidae is a small family of tropical birds with webbed lobes on their feet similar to those of grebes and coots.

- African finfoot, Podica senegalensis

== Cranes ==
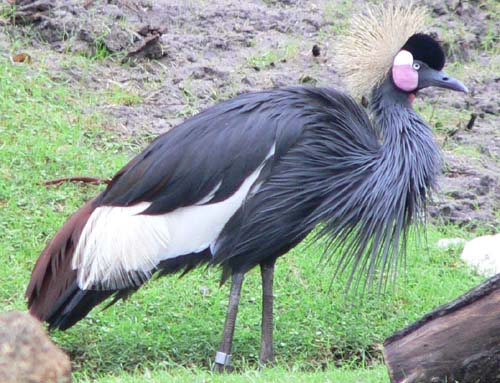
Black-crowned crane (Balearica pavonina)

Order: Gruiformes Family: Gruidae

Cranes are large, long-legged, and long-necked birds. Unlike the similar-looking but unrelated herons, cranes fly with necks outstretched, not pulled back. Most have elaborate and noisy courting displays or "dances".

- Black crowned crane, Balearica pavonina

== Thick-knees ==
Order: Charadriiformes Family: Burhinidae

The thick-knees are a group of waders found worldwide within the tropical zone, with some species also breeding in temperate Europe and Australia. They are medium to large waders with strong black or yellow-black bills, large yellow eyes, and cryptic plumage. Despite being classed as waders, most species have a preference for arid or semi-arid habitats.

- Eurasian thick-knee, Burhinus oedicnemus (A)
- Senegal thick-knee, Burhinus senegalensis
- Spotted thick-knee, Burhinus capensis

== Egyptian plover ==
Order: Charadriiformes Family: Pluvianidae

The Egyptian plover is found across equatorial Africa and along the Nile River.

- Egyptian plover, Pluvianus aegyptius

== Stilts and avocets ==
Order: Charadriiformes Family: Recurvirostridae

Recurvirostridae is a family of large wading birds which includes the avocets and stilts. The avocets have long legs and long up-curved bills. The stilts have extremely long legs and long, thin, straight bills.

- Black-winged stilt, Himantopus himantopus
- Pied avocet, Recurvirostra avosetta

== Oystercatchers ==
Order: Charadriiformes Family: Haematopodidae

The oystercatchers are large and noisy plover-like birds with strong bills used for smashing or prising open molluscs.

- Eurasian oystercatcher, Haematopus ostralegus
- African oystercatcher, Haematopus moquini (A)

== Plovers and lapwings ==
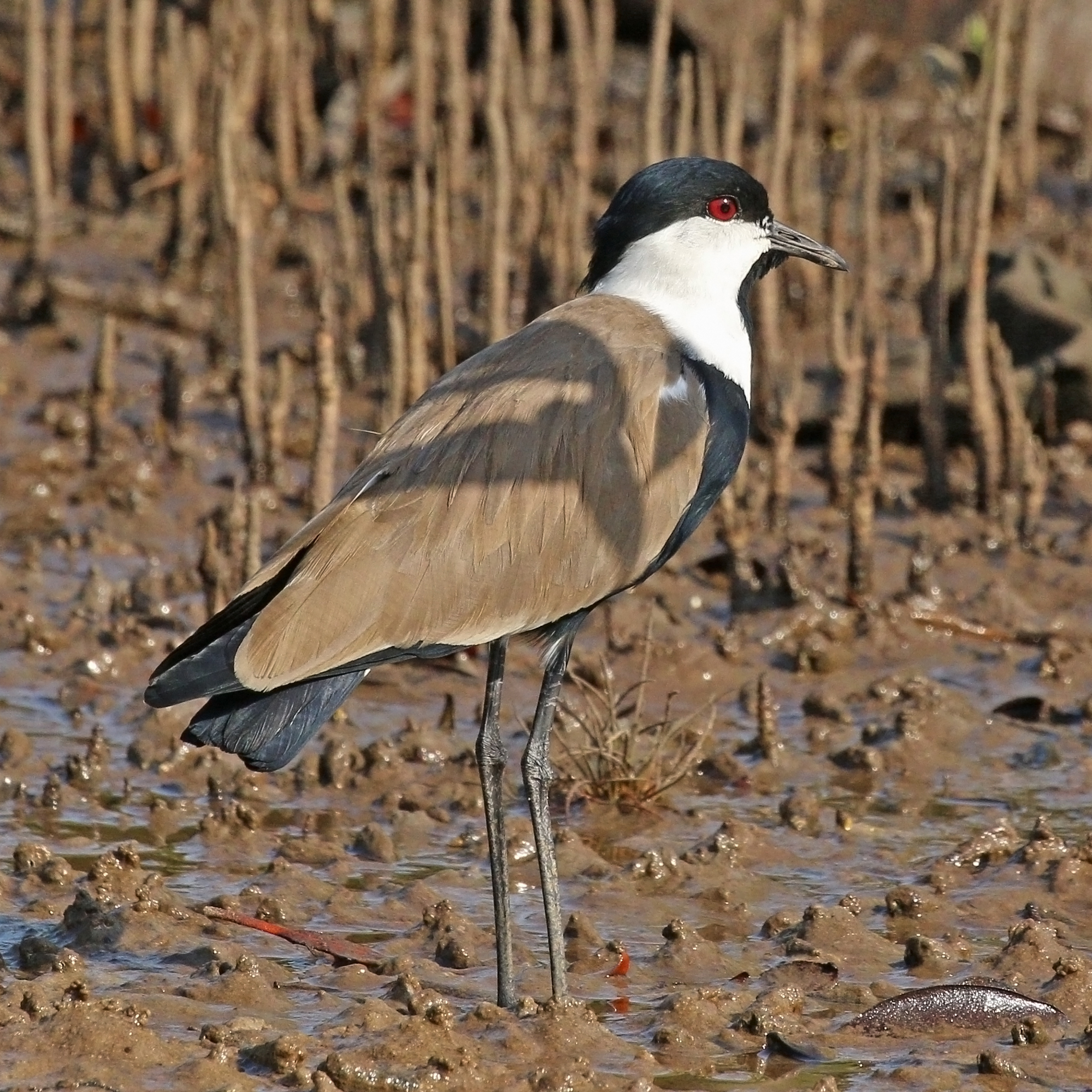
Spur-winged plovers are ubiquitous throughout the country, though seldom far from water.

Order: Charadriiformes Family: Charadriidae

Lapwings, plovers and dotterels are small to medium-sized birds with compact bodies, short, thick necks and long, usually pointed, wings. They are found in open country worldwide, generally in habitats near water, although there are some exceptions.

- Black-bellied plover, Pluvialis squatarola
- European golden-plover, Pluvialis apricaria (A)
- American golden-plover, Pluvialis dominica (A)
- Northern lapwing, Vanellus vanellus (A)
- Spur-winged lapwing, Vanellus spinosus
- Black-headed lapwing, Vanellus tectus
- White-headed lapwing, Vanellus albiceps
- Senegal lapwing, Vanellus lugubris (A)
- Wattled lapwing, Vanellus senegallus
- Caspian plover, Charadrius asiaticus (A)
- Kittlitz's plover, Charadrius pecuarius
- Kentish plover, Charadrius alexandrinus
- Common ringed plover, Charadrius hiaticula
- Little ringed plover, Charadrius dubius
- Forbes's plover, Charadrius forbesi (A)
- White-fronted plover, Charadrius marginatus
- Eurasian dotterel, Charadrius morinellus (A)

== Painted-snipes ==
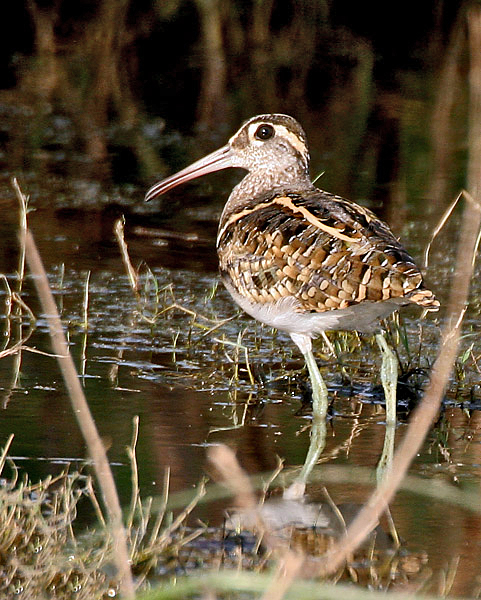
The greater painted-snipe is largely crepuscular, or most active around dawn and dusk.

Order: Charadriiformes Family: Rostratulidae

Painted-snipes are short-legged, long-billed birds similar in shape to the true snipes, but more brightly coloured.

- Greater painted-snipe, Rostratula benghalensis

== Jacanas ==
Order: Charadriiformes Family: Jacanidae

The jacanas are a group of waders found throughout the tropics. They are identifiable by their huge feet and claws which enable them to walk on floating vegetation in the shallow lakes that are their preferred habitat.

- Lesser jacana, Microparra capensis (A)
- African jacana, Actophilornis africanus

== Sandpipers and allies ==
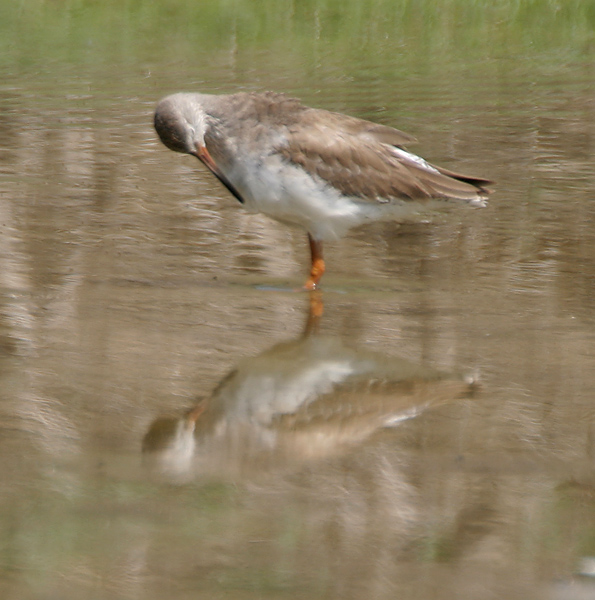
Common redshanks are common to abundant throughout the country during the winter months.

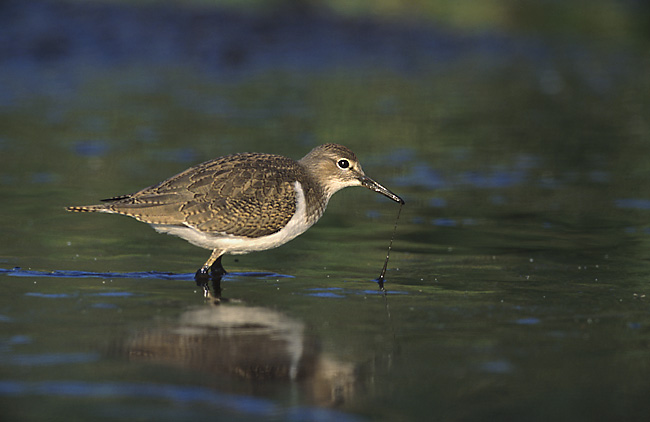
Common sandpipers are among the handful of waders which regularly hunt fiddler crabs.

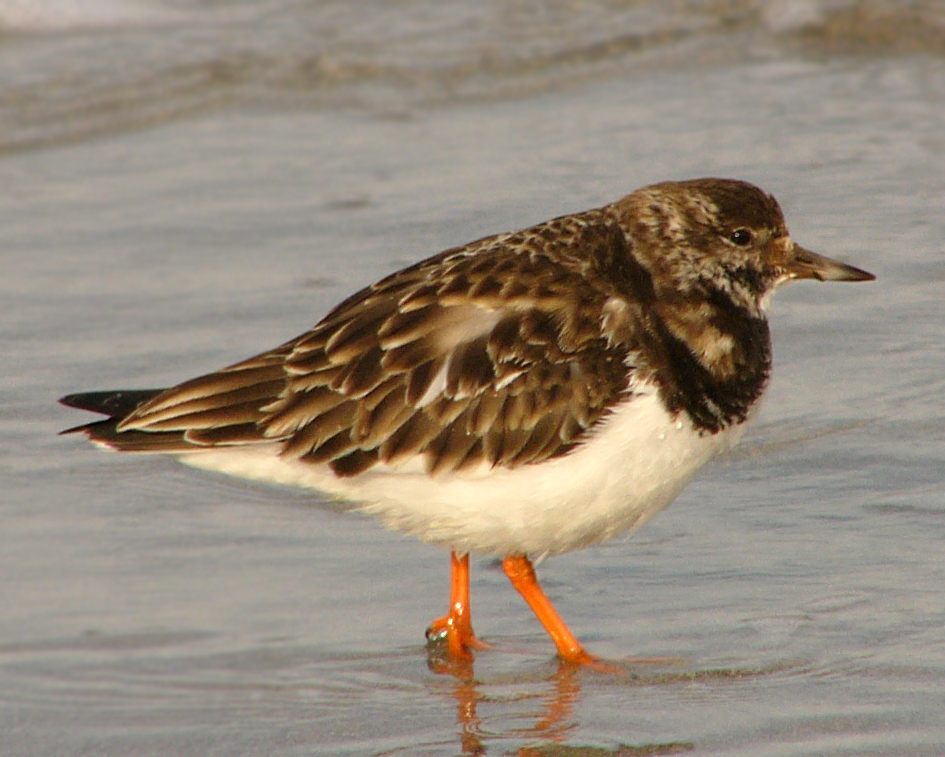
Ruddy turnstones are found in parties of 15-40 along the coast, principally between October and March.

Order: Charadriiformes Family: Scolopacidae

- Whimbrel, Numenius phaeopus
- Eurasian curlew, Numenius arquata
- Bar-tailed godwit, Limosa lapponica
- Black-tailed godwit, Limosa limosa
- Ruddy turnstone, Arenaria interpres
- Red knot, Calidris canutus
- Ruff, Calidris pugnax
- Curlew sandpiper, Calidris ferruginea
- Temminck's stint, Calidris temminckii
- Sanderling, Calidris alba
- Dunlin, Calidris alpina
- Purple sandpiper, Calidris maritima
- Baird's sandpiper, Calidris bairdii (A)
- Little stint, Calidris minuta
- Long-billed dowitcher, Limnodromus scolopaceus (A)
- Jack snipe, Lymnocryptes minimus
- Great snipe, Gallinago media (A)
- Common snipe, Gallinago gallinago
- Terek sandpiper, Xenus cinereus (A)
- Red-necked phalarope, Phalaropus lobatus (A)
- Red phalarope, Phalaropus fulicarius
- Common sandpiper, Actitis hypoleucos
- Green sandpiper, Tringa ochropus
- Solitary sandpiper, Tringa solitaria (A)
- Spotted redshank, Tringa erythropus
- Common greenshank, Tringa nebularia
- Lesser yellowlegs, Tringa flavipes (A)
- Marsh sandpiper, Tringa stagnatilis
- Wood sandpiper, Tringa glareola
- Common redshank, Tringa totanus

== Buttonquail ==
Order: Charadriiformes Family: Turnicidae

The buttonquail are small, drab, running birds which resemble the true quails. The female is the brighter of the sexes and initiates courtship. The male incubates the eggs and tends the young.

- Small buttonquail, Turnix sylvaticus
- Quail-plover, Ortyxelos meiffrenii (A)

== Pratincoles and coursers ==
Order: Charadriiformes Family: Glareolidae

Glareolidae is a family of wading birds comprising the pratincoles, which have short legs, long pointed wings, and long forked tails, and the coursers, which have long legs, short wings, and long, pointed bills which curve downwards.

- Cream-coloured courser, Cursorius cursor (A)
- Temminck's courser, Cursorius temminckii
- Bronze-winged courser, Rhinoptilus chalcopterus
- Collared pratincole, Glareola pratincola

== Skuas and jaegers ==
Order: Charadriiformes Family: Stercorariidae

The family Stercorariidae are, in general, medium to large birds, typically with grey or brown plumage, often with white markings on the wings. They nest on the ground in temperate and arctic regions and are long-distance migrants.

- Great skua, Stercorarius skua (A)
- Pomarine jaeger, Stercorarius pomarinus
- Parasitic jaeger, Stercorarius parasiticus

== Gulls, terns, and skimmers ==
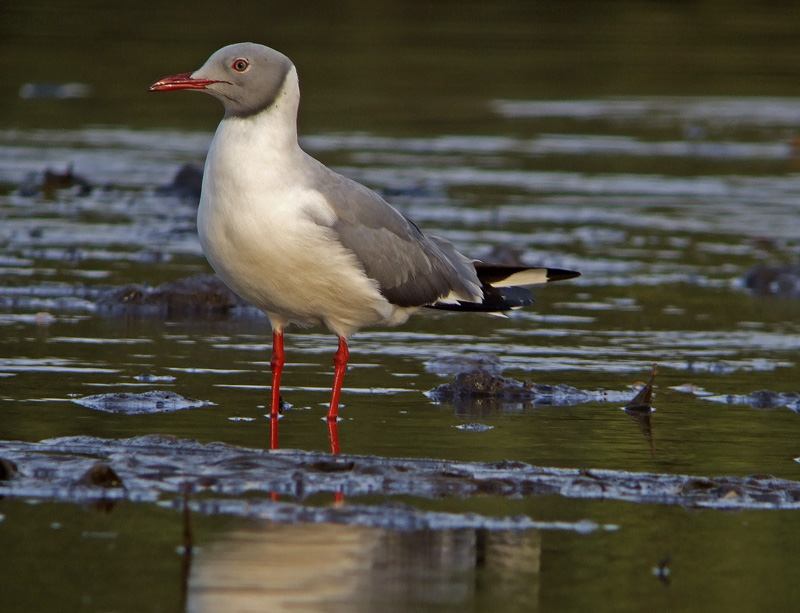
Grey-headed gulls are abundant along the coast, sometimes gathering in flocks of hundreds or thousands.

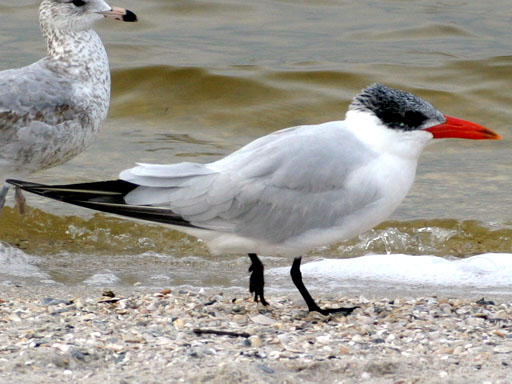
Caspian tern

Order: Charadriiformes Family: Laridae

- Black-legged kittiwake, Rissa tridactyla (A)
- Sabine's gull, Xema sabini (A)
- Slender-billed gull, Chroicocephalus genei
- Gray-hooded gull, Chroicocephalus cirrocephalus
- Black-headed gull, Chroicocephalus ridibundus
- Little gull, Hydrocoloeus minutus (A)
- Laughing gull, Leucophaeus atricilla (A)
- Franklin's gull, Leucophaeus pipixcan (A)
- Mediterranean gull, Ichthyaetus melanocephalus (A)
- Audouin's gull, Ichthyaetus audouinii
- Common gull, Larus canus (A)
- Ring-billed gull, Larus delawarensis (A)
- Herring gull, Larus argentatus (A)
- Yellow-legged gull, Larus michahellis (A)
- Lesser black-backed gull, Larus fuscus
- Kelp gull, Larus dominicanus
- Brown noddy, Anous stolidus (A)
- Black noddy, Anous minutus (A)
- Bridled tern, Onychoprion anaethetus (A)
- Little tern, Sternula albifrons
- Gull-billed tern, Gelochelidon nilotica
- Caspian tern, Hydroprogne caspia
- Black tern, Chlidonias niger
- White-winged tern, Chlidonias leucopterus
- Whiskered tern, Chlidonias hybrida
- Roseate tern, Sterna dougallii (A)
- Common tern, Sterna hirundo
- Arctic tern, Sterna paradisaea
- Sandwich tern, Thalasseus sandvicensis
- Lesser crested tern, Thalasseus bengalensis
- West African crested tern, Thalasseus albididorsalis
- African skimmer, Rynchops flavirostris

== Tropicbirds ==
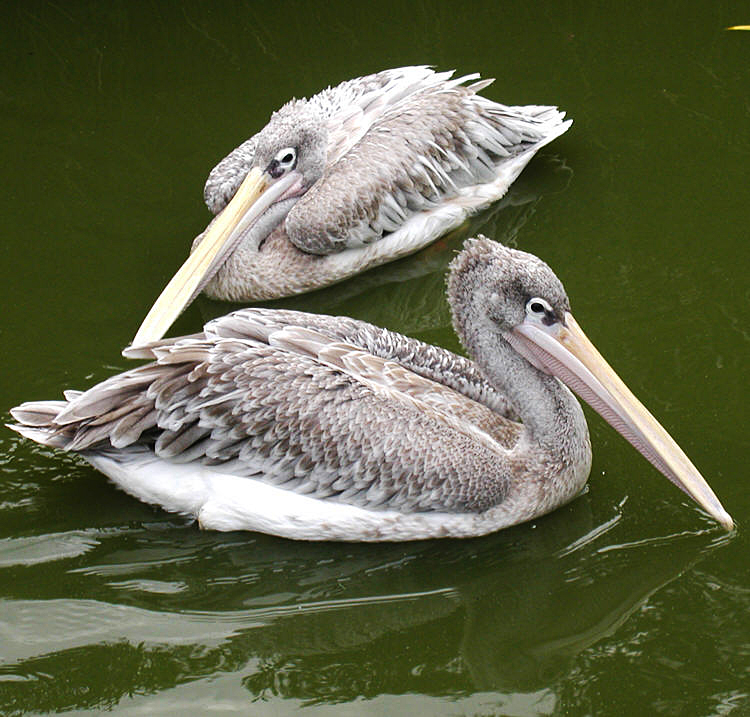
Pink-backed pelicans are abundant along the coast, less common most places upriver.

Order: Phaethontiformes Family: Phaethontidae

Tropicbirds are slender white birds of tropical oceans, with exceptionally long central tail feathers. Their heads and long wings have black markings.

- Red-billed tropicbird, Phaethon aethereus

== Southern storm-petrels ==
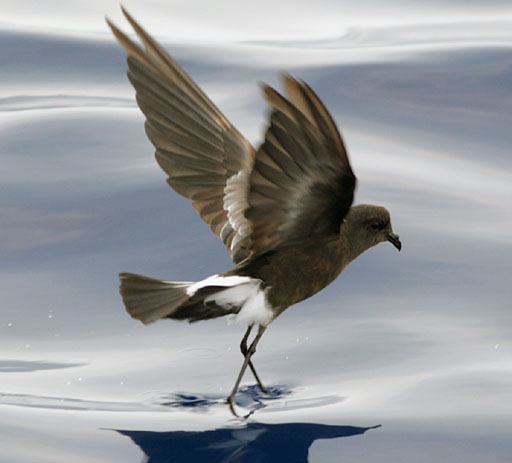
Wilson's storm petrels are sometimes abundant offshore between April and September.

Order: Procellariiformes Family: Oceanitidae

The southern storm-petrels are relatives of the petrels and are the smallest seabirds. They feed on planktonic crustaceans and small fish picked from the surface, typically while hovering. The flight is fluttering and sometimes bat-like.

- Wilson's storm-petrel, Oceanites oceanicus

== Northern storm-petrels ==
Order: Procellariiformes Family: Hydrobatidae

Though the members of this family are similar in many respects to the southern storm-petrels, including their general appearance and habits, there are enough genetic differences to warrant their placement in a separate family.

- European storm-petrel, Hydrobates pelagicus
- Leach's storm-petrel, Hydrobates leucorhous (A)

== Shearwaters and petrels ==
Order: Procellariiformes Family: Procellariidae

Shearwaters are medium-sized, long-winged seabirds. Highly pelagic, they come ashore only to breed, nesting on islands and rocky cliffs. They generally glide low above the water on stiff wings, and feed on fish, squid and similar oceanic food. There are 23–27 species worldwide. (Some experts split Audubon's shearwater into several distinct species, while others consider those distinctive forms to be subspecies.)

- Fea's petrel, Pterodroma feae
- Cory's shearwater, Calonectris diomedea
- Great shearwater, Ardenna gravis (A)
- Sooty shearwater, Ardenna grisea (A)
- Manx shearwater, Puffinus puffinus (A)
- Balearic shearwater, Puffinus mauretanicus
- Boyd's shearwater, Puffinus boydi

== Storks ==
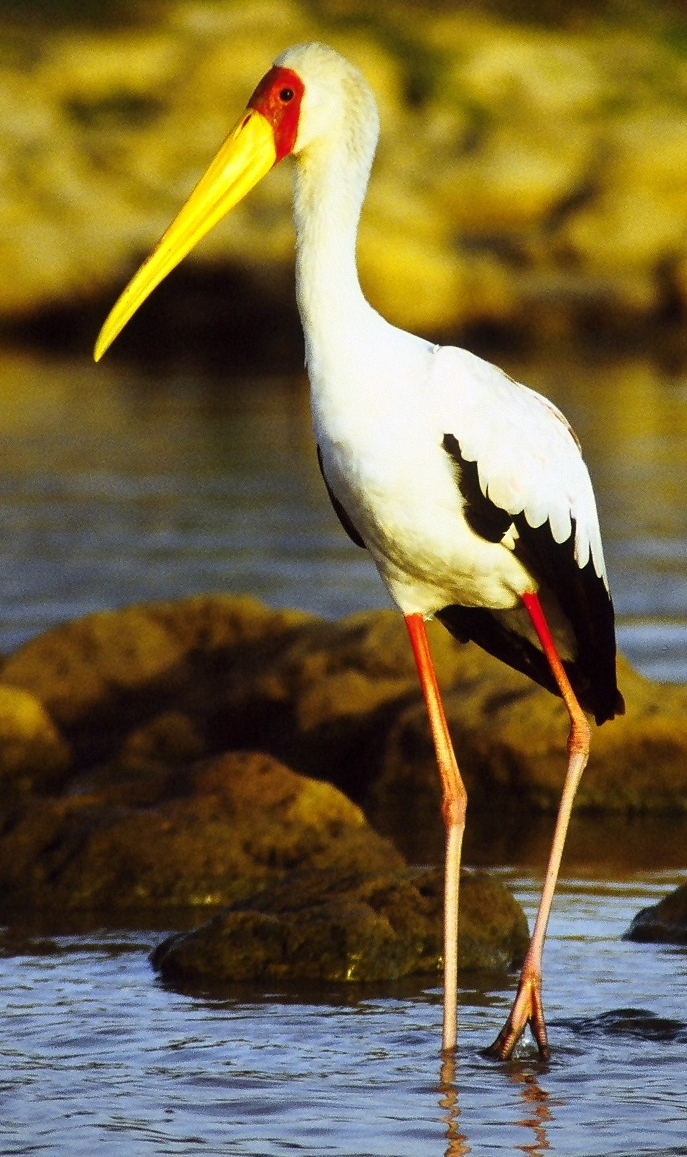
Yellow-billed storks are most common near the coast.

Order: Ciconiiformes Family: Ciconiidae

Storks are large, long-legged, long-necked wading birds with long stout bills. They occur in most of the world's warmer regions and tend to live in drier habitats than herons, to which they're closely related. They build large stick nests and sometimes nest colonially. Many species are migratory. Most storks eat a variety of small vertebrates and invertebrates; some eat carrion. Seven species have been recorded in the Gambia.

- Black stork, Ciconia nigra (A)
- Abdim's stork, Ciconia abdimii (A)
- African woolly-necked stork, Ciconia microscelis
- White stork, Ciconia ciconia (A)
- Saddle-billed stork, Ephippiorhynchus senegalensis
- Marabou stork, Leptoptilos crumenifer
- Yellow-billed stork, Mycteria ibis

== Frigatebirds ==
Order: Suliformes Family: Fregatidae

Frigatebirds are large seabirds typically found soaring over tropical oceans. They have long wings and a deeply forked tail; their plumage is either black (males) or black-and-white (females and young). Males have coloured inflatable throat pouches, which are used in courtship. Frigatebirds spend most of their time in the air. They are kleptoparasites and often chase other seabirds to get them to drop their catches of fish; they also scoop fish from the water's surface.

- Magnificent frigatebird, Fregata magnificens (A)

== Gannets and boobies ==
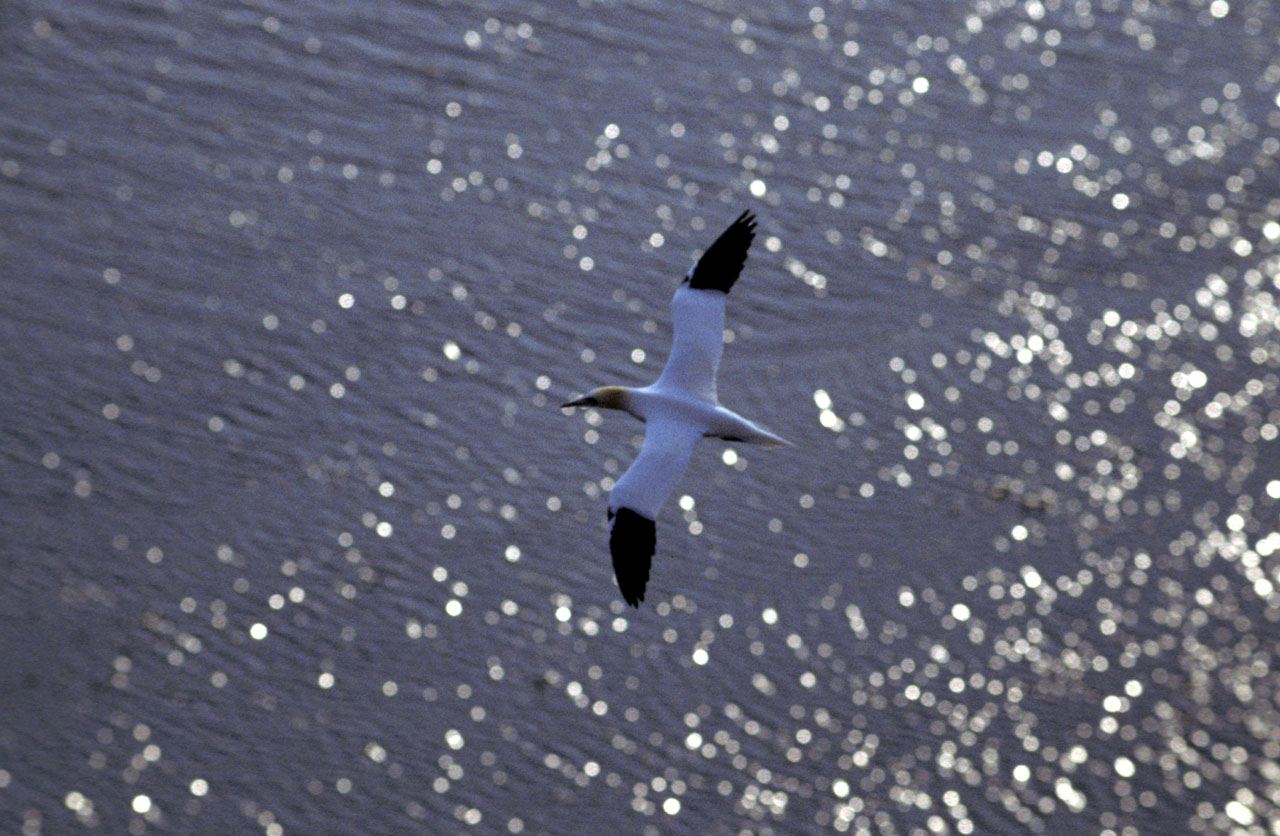
Northern gannets are sometimes seen offshore, generally after strong harmattan winds.

Order: Suliformes Family: Sulidae

Gannets and boobies are large seabirds with long beaks and long, pointed wings. They eat fish, which they hunt by plunge-diving from heights of up to 30 m and chasing their prey underwater. They nest colonially on islands and along coasts, either on the ground or in trees.

- Brown booby, Sula leucogaster (A)
- Northern gannet, Morus bassanus

== Anhingas ==
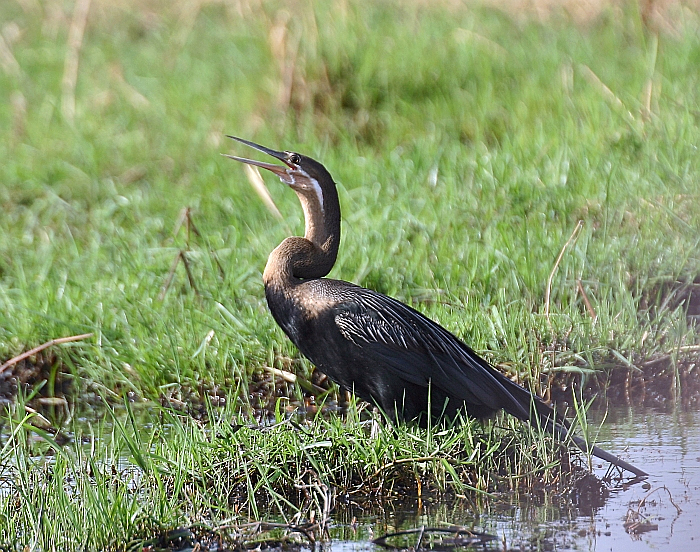
The African darter is sometimes called the "snake bird" due to its habit of swimming with only its head and neck sticking out of the water.

Order: Suliformes Family: Anhingidae

Anhingas or darters are large waterbirds, found primarily in fresh and brackish water habitats. Because their plumage is not entirely waterproof, they often stand out of the water with their wings outstretched, drying off. Darters are strongly sexually dimorphic; males generally have much darker plumage than do females. They eat primarily fish, which they catch by diving from the water's surface.

- African darter, Anhinga rufa

== Cormorants and shags ==
Order: Suliformes Family: Phalacrocoracidae

Cormorants are medium to large seabirds, found primarily along the coast, but occasionally ranging some way inland in aquatic environments. Their plumage is generally dark, though most species have areas of brightly coloured skin on the face. They are primarily fish eaters. Their bills are long, thin and sharply hooked, and their four-toed feet are webbed. Because their plumage is only semi-waterproof, they often stand out of the water with their wings outstretched to dry out their feathers.

- Long-tailed cormorant, Microcarbo africanus
- Great cormorant, Phalacrocorax carbo

== Pelicans ==
Order: Pelecaniformes Family: Pelecanidae

Pelicans are large water birds with a distinctive pouch under their beak. As with other members of the order Pelecaniformes, they have webbed feet with four toes.

- Great white pelican, Pelecanus onocrotalus
- Pink-backed pelican, Pelecanus rufescens

== Hamerkop ==
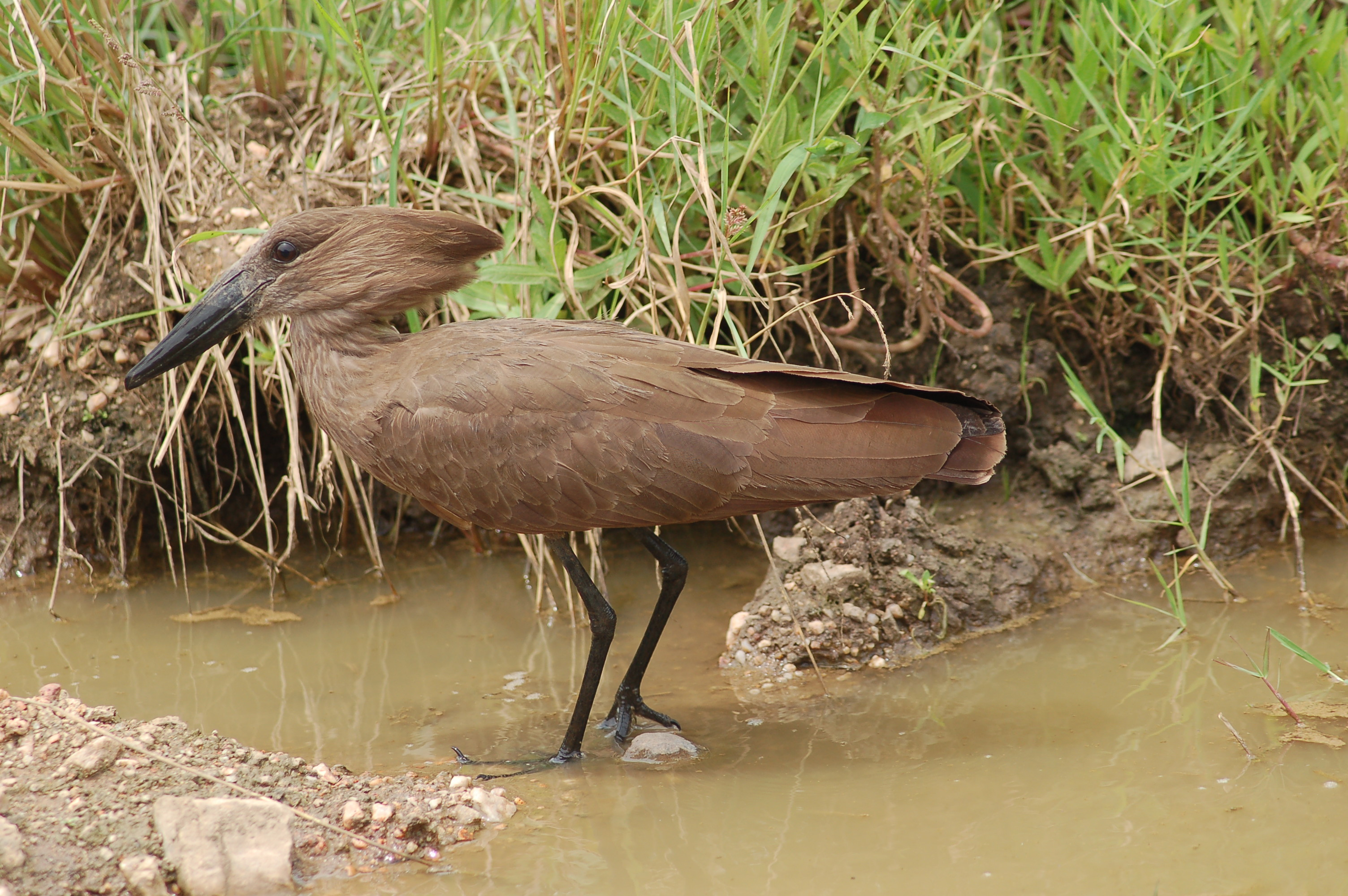
The often-gregarious hamerkop builds one of the largest and most complex of all bird nests.

Order: Pelecaniformes Family: Scopidae

Hamerkops are medium-sized, all-brown wading birds named for their hammer-headed appearance, which is created by the combination of their shaggy backwards-pointing crests and their heavy black bills. Typically found in wetland areas, they forage in shallow water for amphibians, small fish, crustaceans, insects, worms and small mammals. They build enormous, complex nests—which they generally use for only a matter of months—and occupy their territories year-round.

- Hamerkop, Scopus umbretta

== Herons, egrets, and bitterns ==
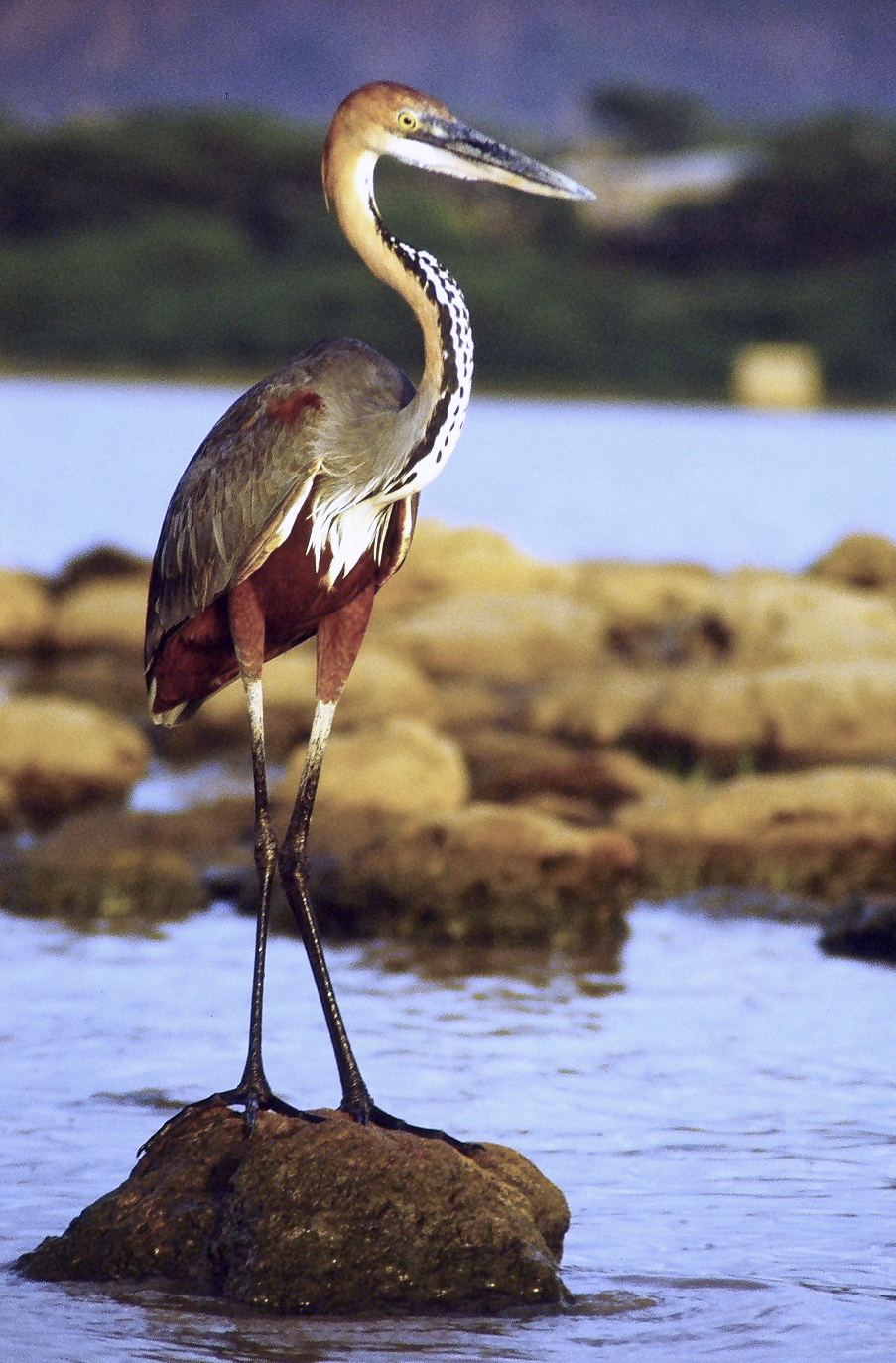
The huge Goliath heron is shy and solitary, typically preferring narrower creeks to more open areas.

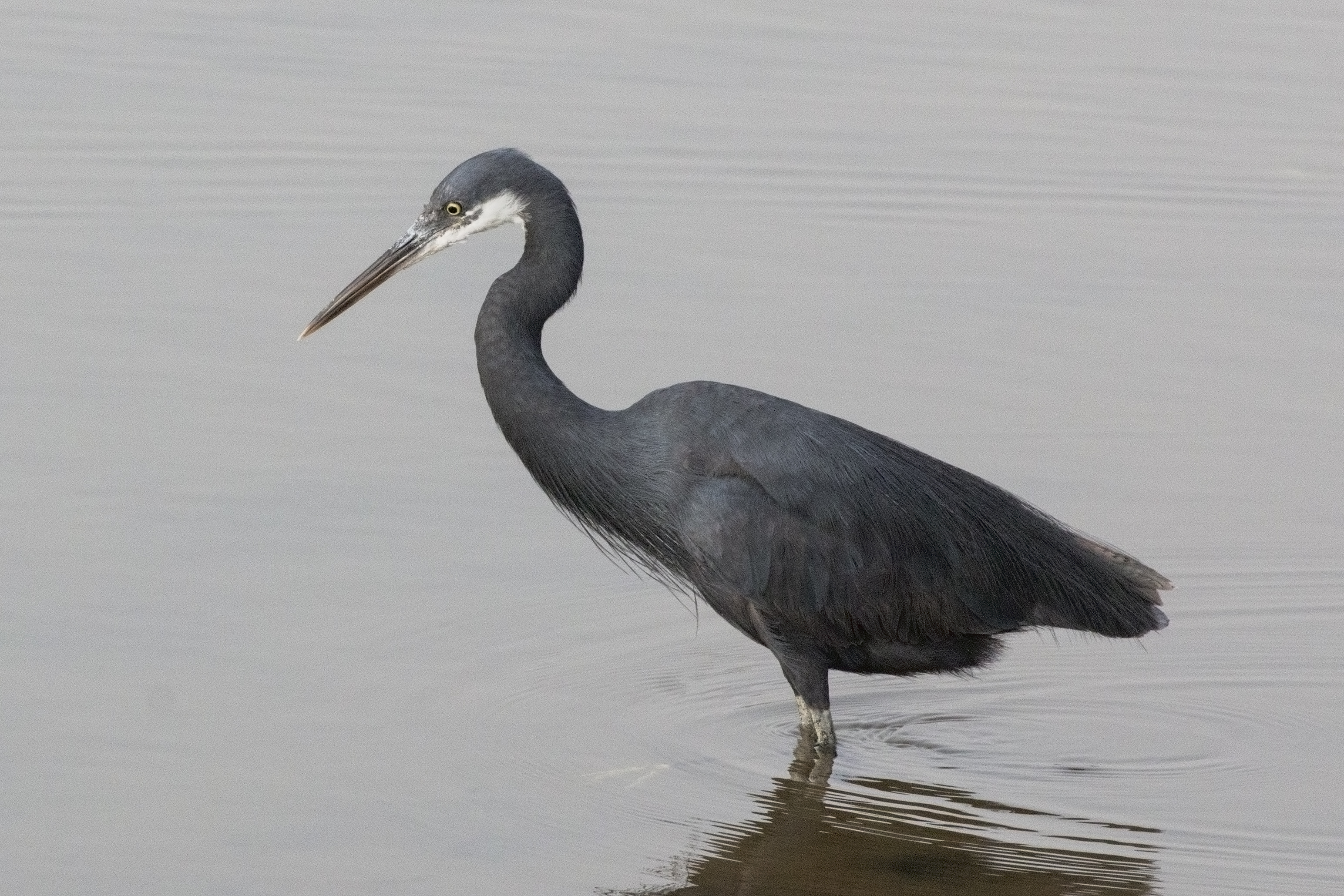
Western reef egret (Egretta gularis gularis) dark morph.jpg

Order: Pelecaniformes Family: Ardeidae

Herons, egrets and bitterns are long-legged birds typically associated with wetlands; herons and egrets are long-necked, while bitterns tend to be shorter-necked and quite secretive. Birds in this family often wade in shallow waters, preying on various aquatic organisms (including fish and frogs) as well as reptiles, amphibians and the occasional small bird. In flight, they hold their neck retracted in a gentle S-curve.

- Great bittern, Botaurus stellaris (A)
- Little bittern, Ixobrychus minutus
- Dwarf bittern, Ixobrychus sturmii
- White-crested bittern, Tigriornis leucolophus
- Gray heron, Ardea cinerea
- Black-headed heron, Ardea melanocephala
- Goliath heron, Ardea goliath
- Purple heron, Ardea purpurea
- Great egret, Ardea alba
- Intermediate egret, Ardea intermedia
- Little egret, Egretta garzetta
- Western reef-heron, Egretta gularis
- Black heron, Egretta ardesiaca
- Cattle egret, Bubulcus ibis
- Squacco heron, Ardeola ralloides
- Striated heron, Butorides striata
- Black-crowned night-heron, Nycticorax nycticorax
- White-backed night-heron, Gorsachius leuconotus

== Ibises and spoonbills ==
Order: Pelecaniformes Family: Threskiornithidae

Threskiornithidae is a family of large terrestrial and wading birds which includes the ibises and spoonbills.

- Glossy ibis, Plegadis falcinellus
- African sacred ibis, Threskiornis aethiopicus
- Hadada ibis, Bostrychia hagedash
- Eurasian spoonbill, Platalea leucorodia
- African spoonbill, Platalea alba

== Secretarybird ==
Order: Accipitriformes Family: Sagittariidae

The secretarybird is a bird of prey in the order Accipitriformes but is easily distinguished from other raptors by its long crane-like legs.

- Secretarybird, Sagittarius serpentarius (A)

== Osprey ==
Order: Accipitriformes Family: Pandionidae

- Osprey, Pandion haliaetus

== Hawks, eagles, and kites ==
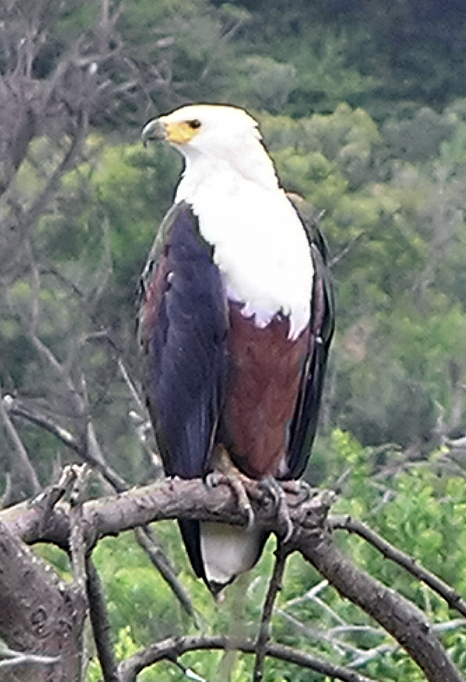
African fish eagles are typically found perched near rivers, creeks or coastal lagoons.

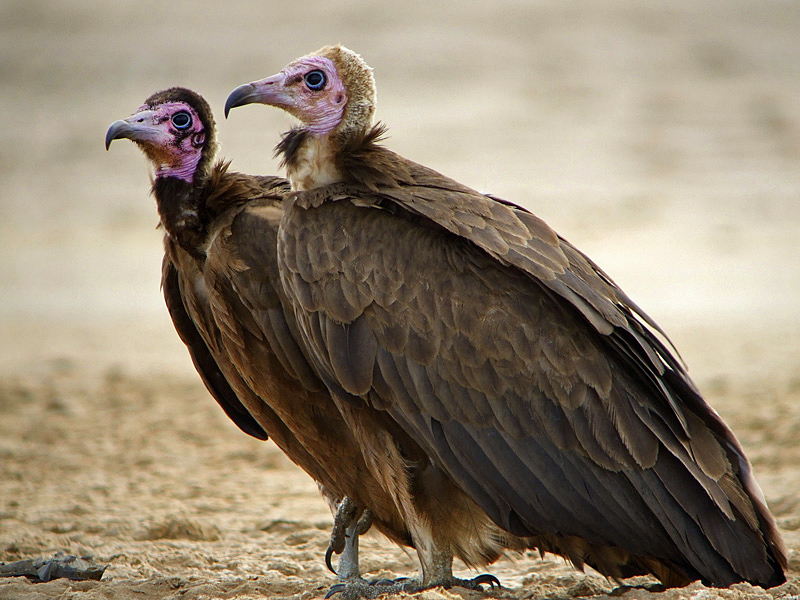
Hooded vultures are abundant throughout the country, particularly around human settlements.

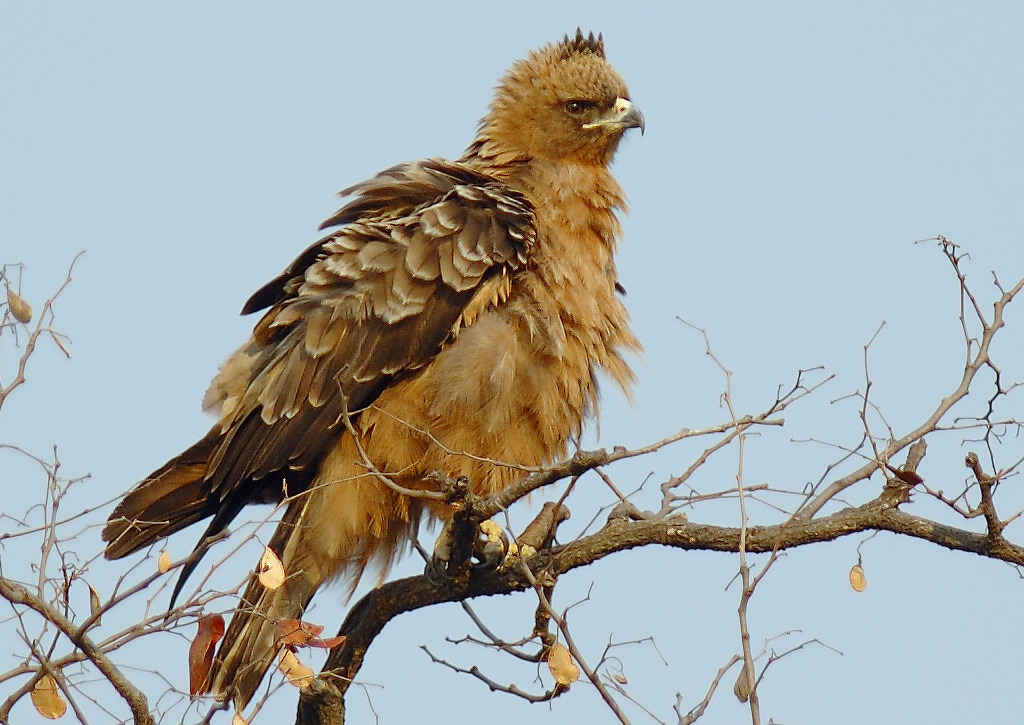
The medium-sized Wahlberg's eagle is common throughout the country all year round.

Order: Accipitriformes Family: Accipitridae

- Black-winged kite, Elanus caeruleus
- Scissor-tailed kite, Chelictinia riocourii
- African harrier-hawk, Polyboroides typus
- Palm-nut vulture, Gypohierax angolensis
- Egyptian vulture, Neophron percnopterus
- European honey-buzzard, Pernis apivorus
- African cuckoo-hawk, Aviceda cuculoides
- White-headed vulture, Trigonoceps occipitalis
- Cinereous vulture, Aegypius monachus (A)
- Lappet-faced vulture, Torgos tracheliotos
- Hooded vulture, Necrosyrtes monachus
- White-backed vulture, Gyps africanus
- Rüppell's griffon, Gyps rueppelli
- Eurasian griffon, Gyps fulvus
- Bateleur, Terathopius ecaudatus
- Short-toed snake-eagle, Circaetus gallicus
- Beaudouin's snake-eagle, Circaetus beaudouini
- Brown snake-eagle, Circaetus cinereus
- Banded snake-eagle, Circaetus cinerascens
- Bat hawk, Macheiramphus alcinus (A)
- Crowned eagle, Stephanoaetus coronatus (A)
- Martial eagle, Polemaetus bellicosus
- Long-crested eagle, Lophaetus occipitalis
- Wahlberg's eagle, Hieraaetus wahlbergi
- Booted eagle, Hieraaetus pennatus
- Ayres's hawk-eagle, Hieraaetus ayresii (A)
- Tawny eagle, Aquila rapax
- Bonelli's eagle, Aquila fasciata (A)
- African hawk-eagle, Aquila spilogaster
- Lizard buzzard, Kaupifalco monogrammicus
- Dark chanting-goshawk, Melierax metabates
- Gabar goshawk, Micronisus gabar
- Grasshopper buzzard, Butastur rufipennis
- Eurasian marsh-harrier, Circus aeruginosus
- Pallid harrier, Circus macrourus
- Montagu's harrier, Circus pygargus
- African goshawk, Accipiter tachiro
- Shikra, Accipiter badius
- Red-thighed sparrowhawk, Accipiter erythropus
- Ovambo sparrowhawk, Accipiter ovampensis
- Eurasian sparrowhawk, Accipiter nisus (A)
- Black goshawk, Accipiter melanoleucus (A)
- Red kite, Milvus milvus (A)
- Black kite, Milvus migrans
- African fish-eagle, Haliaeetus vocifer
- Common buzzard, Buteo buteo (A)
- Long-legged buzzard, Buteo rufinus (A)
- Red-necked buzzard, Buteo auguralis
- Augur buzzard, Buteo augur

== Barn-owls ==
Order: Strigiformes Family: Tytonidae

Barn-owls are medium to large owls with large heads and characteristic heart-shaped faces. They have long strong legs with powerful talons.

- Western barn owl, Tyto alba

== Owls ==
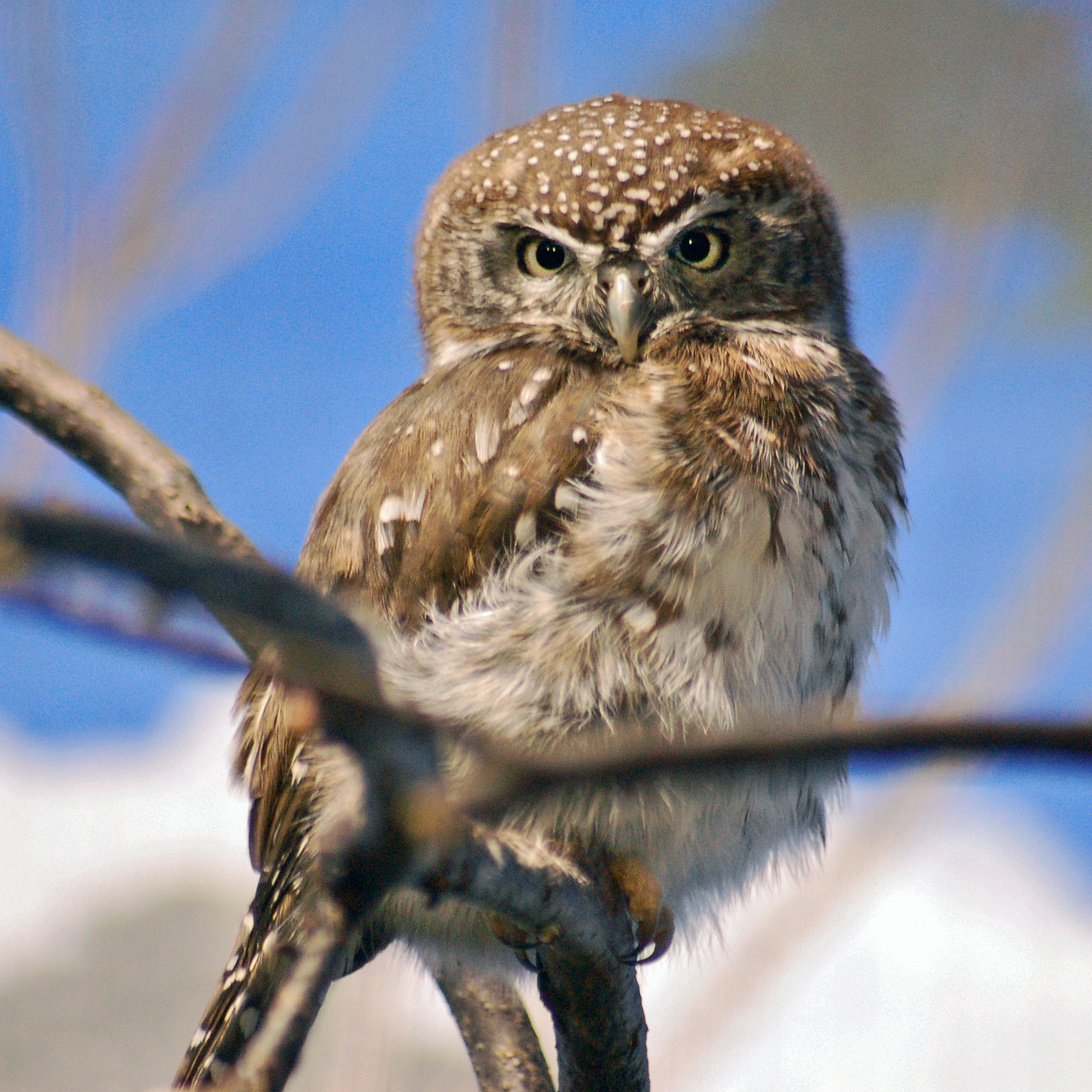
Pearl-spotted owlet (Glaucidium perlatum)

Order: Strigiformes Family: Strigidae

The typical owls are small to large solitary nocturnal birds of prey. They have large forward-facing eyes and ears, a hawk-like beak and a conspicuous circle of feathers around each eye called a facial disk.

- Eurasian scops-owl, Otus scops
- African scops-owl, Otus senegalensis
- Northern white-faced owl, Ptilopsis leucotis
- Grayish eagle-owl, Bubo cinerascens
- Verreaux's eagle-owl, Bubo lacteus
- Pel's fishing-owl, Scotopelia peli
- Pearl-spotted owlet, Glaucidium perlatum
- African wood-owl, Strix woodfordii
- Short-eared owl, Asio flammeus (A)
- Marsh owl, Asio capensis

== Mousebirds ==
Order: Coliiformes Family: Coliidae

The mousebirds are slender grayish or brown birds with soft, hairlike body feathers and very long thin tails. They are arboreal and scurry through the leaves like rodents in search of berries, fruit, and buds. They are acrobatic and can feed upside down. All species have strong claws and reversible outer toes. They also have crests and stubby bills.

- Blue-naped mousebird, Urocolius macrourus (A)

== Hoopoes ==
Order: Bucerotiformes Family: Upupidae

Hoopoes have black, white and orangey-pink colouring with a large erectile crest on their head.

- Eurasian hoopoe, Upupa epops

== Woodhoopoes and scimitarbills ==
Order: Bucerotiformes Family: Phoeniculidae

The woodhoopoes are related to the kingfishers, rollers and hoopoes. They most resemble the hoopoes with their long curved bills, used to probe for insects, and short rounded wings. However, they differ in that they have metallic plumage, often blue, green or purple, and lack an erectile crest.

- Green woodhoopoe, Phoeniculus purpureus
- Black scimitarbill, Rhinopomastus aterrimus

== Ground-hornbills ==
Order: Bucerotiformes Family: Bucorvidae

The ground-hornbills are terrestrial birds which feed almost entirely on insects, other birds, snakes, and amphibians.

- Abyssinian ground-hornbill, Bucorvus abyssinicus

== Hornbills ==
Order: Bucerotiformes Family: Bucerotidae

Hornbills are a group of birds whose bill is shaped like a cow's horn, but without a twist, sometimes with a casque on the upper mandible. Frequently, the bill is brightly coloured.

- African pied hornbill, Lophoceros fasciatus
- African gray hornbill, Lophoceros nasutus
- Western red-billed hornbill, Tockus kempi
- Black-casqued hornbill, Ceratogymna atrata (A)
- Yellow-casqued hornbill, Ceratogymna elata (Ex)
- Piping hornbill, Bycanistes fistulator

== Kingfishers ==
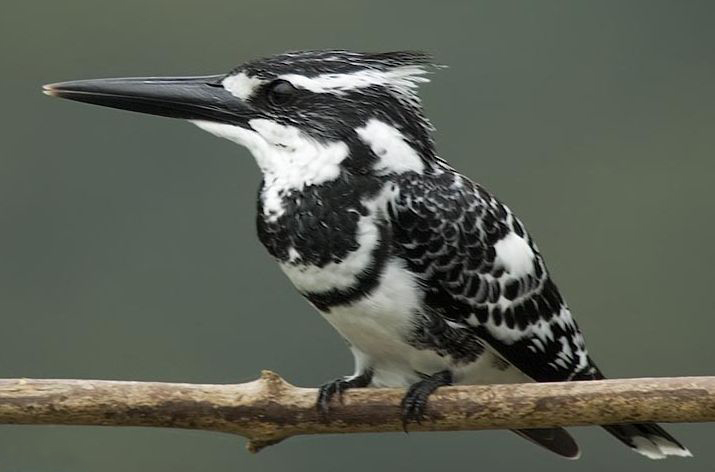
The widespread pied kingfisher is quite gregarious and is often found in small noisy groups.

Order: Coraciiformes Family: Alcedinidae

- Shining blue kingfisher, Alcedo quadribrachys
- Malachite kingfisher, Corythornis cristatus
- African pygmy kingfisher, Ispidina picta
- Gray-headed kingfisher, Halcyon leucocephala
- Woodland kingfisher, Halcyon senegalensis
- Blue-breasted kingfisher, Halcyon malimbica
- Striped kingfisher, Halcyon chelicuti
- Giant kingfisher, Megaceryle maxima
- Pied kingfisher, Ceryle rudis

== Bee-eaters ==
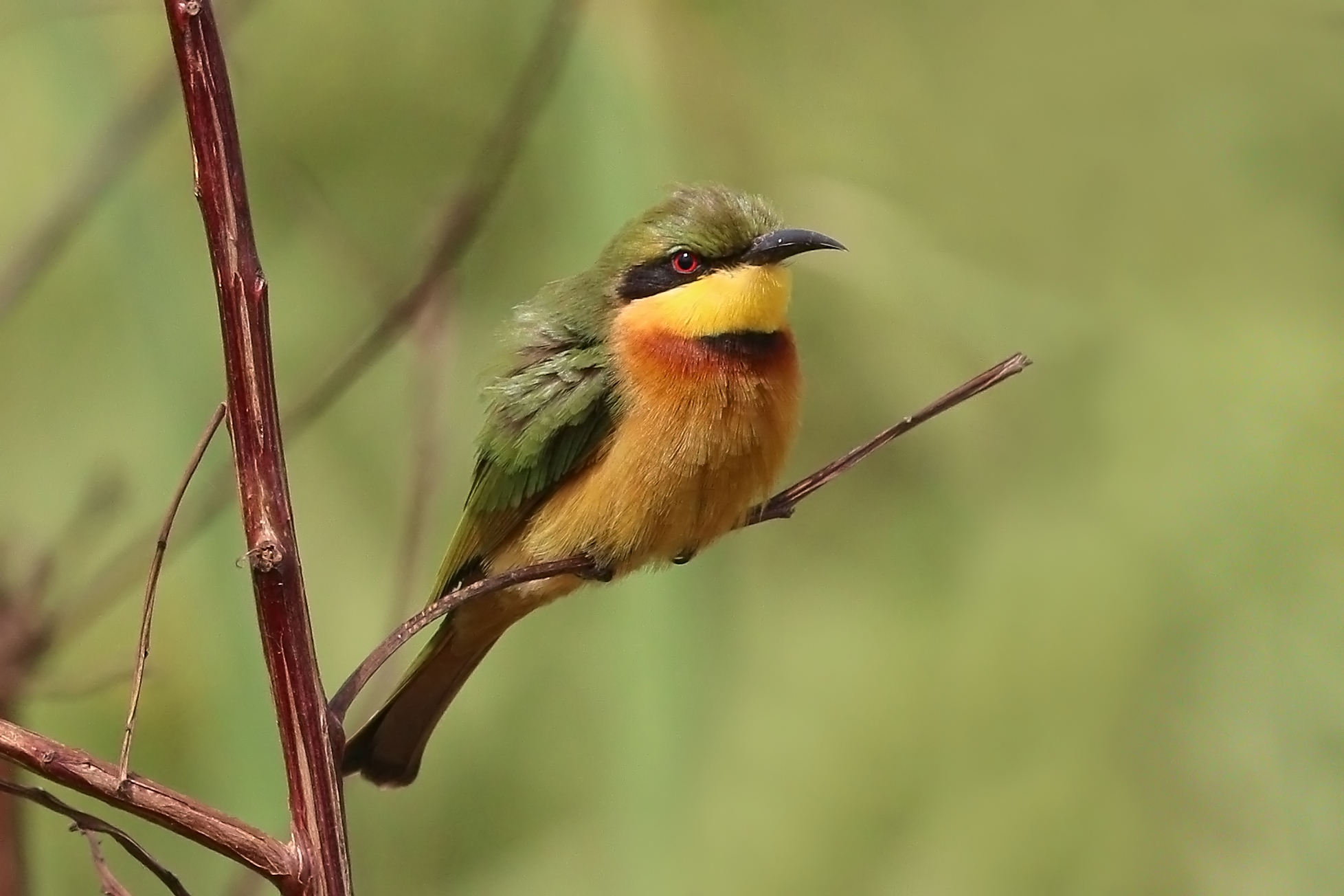
Little bee-eater (Merops pusillus pusillus)

Order: Coraciiformes Family: Meropidae

The bee-eaters are a group of coraciiform birds in the family Meropidae. Most species are found in Africa but others occur in southern Europe, Madagascar, Australia and New Guinea. They are characterised by richly coloured plumage, slender bodies and usually elongated central tail feathers. All are colourful and have long downturned bills and pointed wings, which give them a swallow-like appearance when seen from afar.

- Red-throated bee-eater, Merops bulocki
- Little bee-eater, Merops pusillus
- Swallow-tailed bee-eater, Merops hirundineus
- White-throated bee-eater, Merops albicollis
- Green bee-eater, Merops orientalis
- Blue-cheeked bee-eater, Merops persicus
- European bee-eater, Merops apiaster
- Northern carmine bee-eater, Merops nubicus

== Rollers ==
Order: Coraciiformes Family: Coraciidae

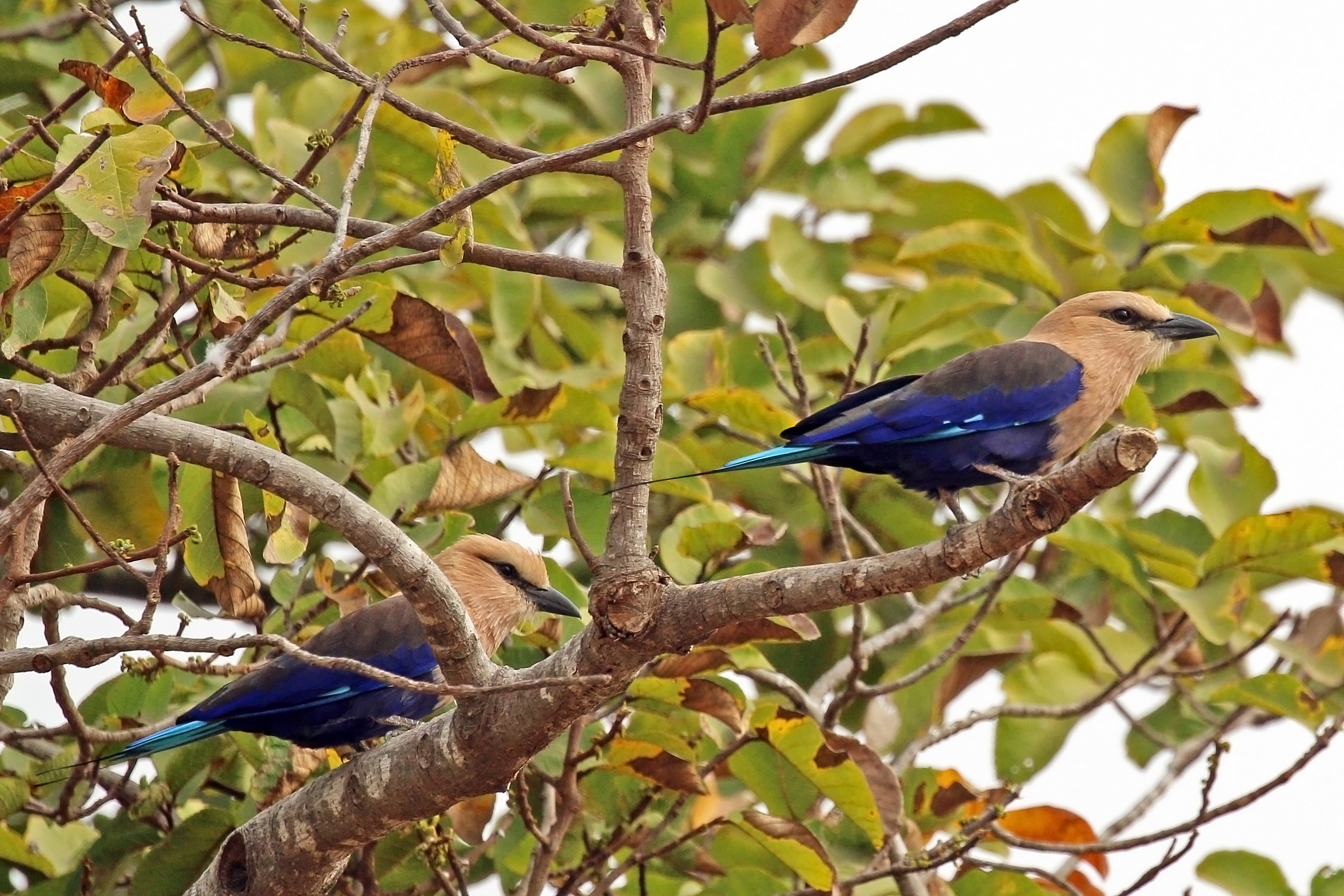
Blue-bellied roller

Rollers resemble crows in size and build, but are more closely related to the kingfishers and bee-eaters. They share the colourful appearance of those groups with blues and browns predominating. The two inner front toes are connected, but the outer toe is not.

- European roller, Coracias garrulus
- Abyssinian roller, Coracias abyssinica
- Rufous-crowned roller, Coracias naevia
- Blue-bellied roller, Coracias cyanogaster
- Broad-billed roller, Eurystomus glaucurus

== African barbets ==
Order: Piciformes Family: Lybiidae

The African barbets are plump birds, with short necks and large heads. They get their name from the bristles which fringe their heavy bills. Most species are brightly coloured.

- Red-rumped tinkerbird, Pogoniulus atroflavus
- Yellow-rumped tinkerbird, Pogoniulus bilineatus
- Yellow-fronted tinkerbird, Pogoniulus chrysoconus
- Hairy-breasted barbet, Tricholaema hirsuta (A)
- Vieillot's barbet, Lybius vieilloti
- Bearded barbet, Lybius dubius

== Honeyguides ==
Order: Piciformes Family: Indicatoridae

Honeyguides are among the few birds that feed on wax. They are named for the greater honeyguide which leads traditional honey-hunters to bees' nests and, after the hunters have harvested the honey, feeds on the remaining contents of the hive.

- Cassin's honeyguide, Prodotiscus insignis (A)
- Wahlberg's honeyguide, Prodotiscus regulus (A)
- Least honeyguide, Indicator exilis
- Lesser honeyguide, Indicator minor
- Spotted honeyguide, Indicator maculatus
- Greater honeyguide, Indicator indicator

== Woodpeckers ==
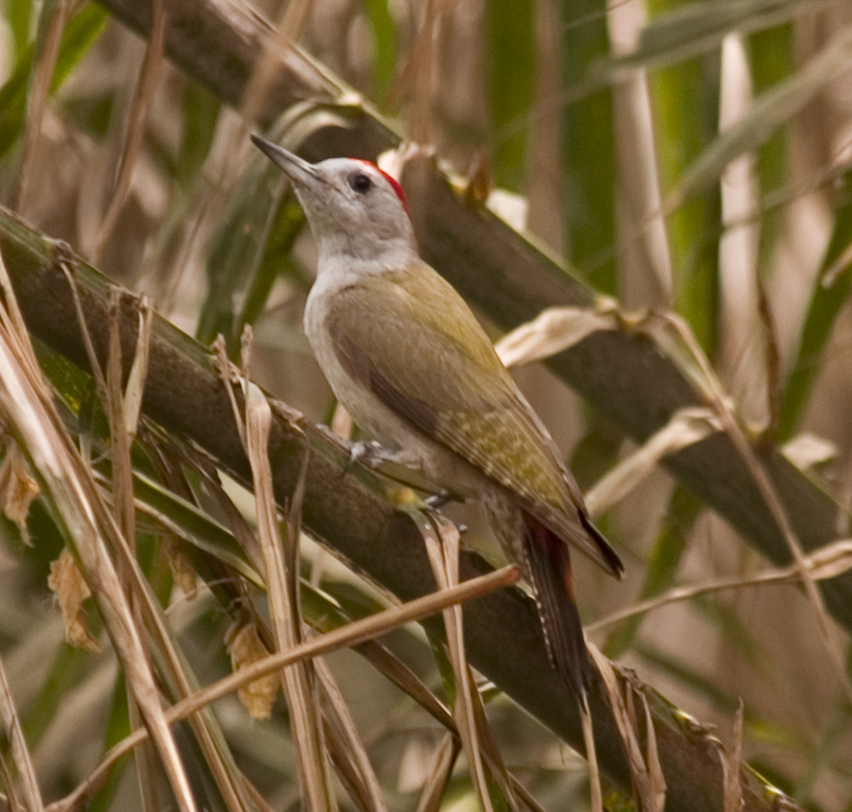
African grey woodpecker

Order: Piciformes Family: Picidae

Woodpeckers are small to medium-sized birds with chisel-like beaks, short legs, stiff tails and long tongues used for capturing insects. Some species have feet with two toes pointing forward and two backward, while several species have only three toes. Many woodpeckers have the habit of tapping noisily on tree trunks with their beaks.

- Eurasian wryneck, Jynx torquilla
- Little grey woodpecker, Chloropicus elachus
- Cardinal woodpecker, Chloropicus fuscescens
- Brown-backed woodpecker, Chloropicus obsoletus
- African gray woodpecker, Chloropicus goertae
- Buff-spotted woodpecker, Campethera nivosa
- Little green woodpecker, Campethera maculosa (A)
- Fine-spotted woodpecker, Campethera punctuligera
- Golden-tailed woodpecker, Campethera abingoni

== Falcons and caracaras ==
Order: Falconiformes Family: Falconidae

Falconidae is a family of diurnal birds of prey. They differ from hawks, eagles and kites in that they kill with their beaks instead of their talons.

- Lesser kestrel, Falco naumanni
- Eurasian kestrel, Falco tinnunculus
- Fox kestrel, Falco alopex (A)
- Gray kestrel, Falco ardosiaceus
- Red-necked falcon, Falco chicquera
- Red-footed falcon, Falco vespertinus (A)
- Eurasian hobby, Falco subbuteo
- African hobby, Falco cuvierii
- Lanner falcon, Falco biarmicus
- Peregrine falcon, Falco peregrinus

== Old World parrots ==
Order: Psittaciformes Family: Psittaculidae

Characteristic features of parrots include a strong curved bill, an upright stance, strong legs, and clawed zygodactyl feet. Many parrots are vividly colored, and some are multi-colored. In size they range from 8 cm (3.1 in) to 1 m (3.3 ft) in length. Old World parrots are found from Africa east across south and southeast Asia and Oceania to Australia and New Zealand.

- Rose-ringed parakeet, Psittacula krameri

== African and New World parrots ==
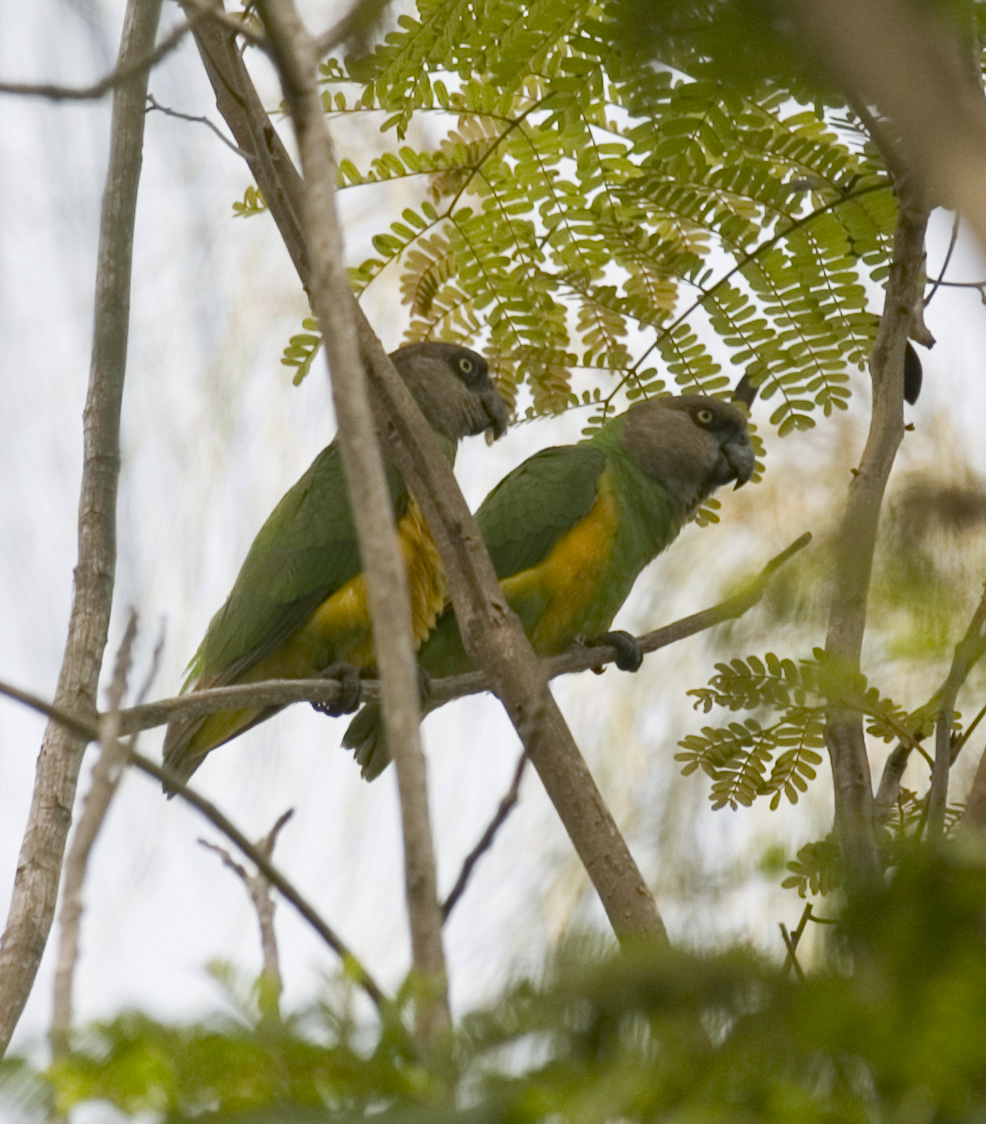
Senegal parrot (Poicephalus senegalus)

Order: Psittaciformes Family: Psittacidae

Parrots are small to large birds with a characteristic curved beak. Their upper mandibles have slight mobility in the joint with the skull and they have a generally erect stance. All parrots are zygodactyl, having the four toes on each foot placed two at the front and two to the back. Most of the more than 150 species in this family are found in the New World.

- Brown-necked parrot, Poicephalus fuscicollis
- Senegal parrot, Poicephalus senegalus

== Cuckooshrikes ==
Order: Passeriformes Family: Campephagidae

The cuckooshrikes are small to medium-sized passerine birds. They are predominantly greyish with white and black, although some species are brightly coloured.

- White-breasted cuckooshrike, Coracina pectoralis
- Red-shouldered cuckooshrike, Campephaga phoenicea

== Old World orioles ==
Order: Passeriformes Family: Oriolidae

The Old World orioles are colourful passerine birds. They are not related to the New World orioles.

- Eurasian golden oriole, Oriolus oriolus (A)
- African golden oriole, Oriolus auratus

== Wattle-eyes and batises ==
Order: Passeriformes Family: Platysteiridae

The wattle-eyes, or puffback flycatchers, are small stout passerine birds of the African tropics. They get their name from the brightly coloured fleshy eye decorations found in most species in this group.

- Brown-throated wattle-eye, Platysteira cyanea
- Senegal batis, Batis senegalensis

== Vangas, helmetshrikes, and allies ==
Order: Passeriformes Family: Vangidae

The helmetshrikes are similar in build to the shrikes, but tend to be colourful species with distinctive crests or other head ornaments, such as wattles, from which they get their name.

- White helmetshrike, Prionops plumatus
- African shrike-flycatcher, Megabyas flammulatus (A)
- Black-and-white shrike-flycatcher, Bias musicus (A)

== Bushshrikes and allies ==
Order: Passeriformes Family: Malaconotidae

Bushshrikes are similar in habits to shrikes, hunting insects and other small prey from a perch on a bush. Although similar in build to the shrikes, these tend to be either colourful species or largely black; some species are quite secretive.

- Brubru, Nilaus afer
- Northern puffback, Dryoscopus gambensis
- Black-crowned tchagra, Tchagra senegala
- Yellow-crowned gonolek, Laniarius barbarus
- Sulphur-breasted bushshrike, Telophorus sulfureopectus
- Gray-headed bushshrike, Malaconotus blanchoti

== Drongos ==
Order: Passeriformes Family: Dicruridae

The drongos are mostly black or dark grey in colour, sometimes with metallic tints. They have long forked tails, and some Asian species have elaborate tail decorations. They have short legs and sit very upright when perched, like a shrike. They flycatch or take prey from the ground.

- Western square-tailed drongo, Dicrurus occidentalis
- Glossy-backed drongo, Dicrurus divaricatus

== Monarch flycatchers ==
Order: Passeriformes Family: Monarchidae

The monarch flycatchers are small to medium-sized insectivorous passerines which hunt by flycatching.

- Black-headed paradise-flycatcher, Terpsiphone rufiventer
- African paradise-flycatcher, Terpsiphone viridis

== Shrikes ==
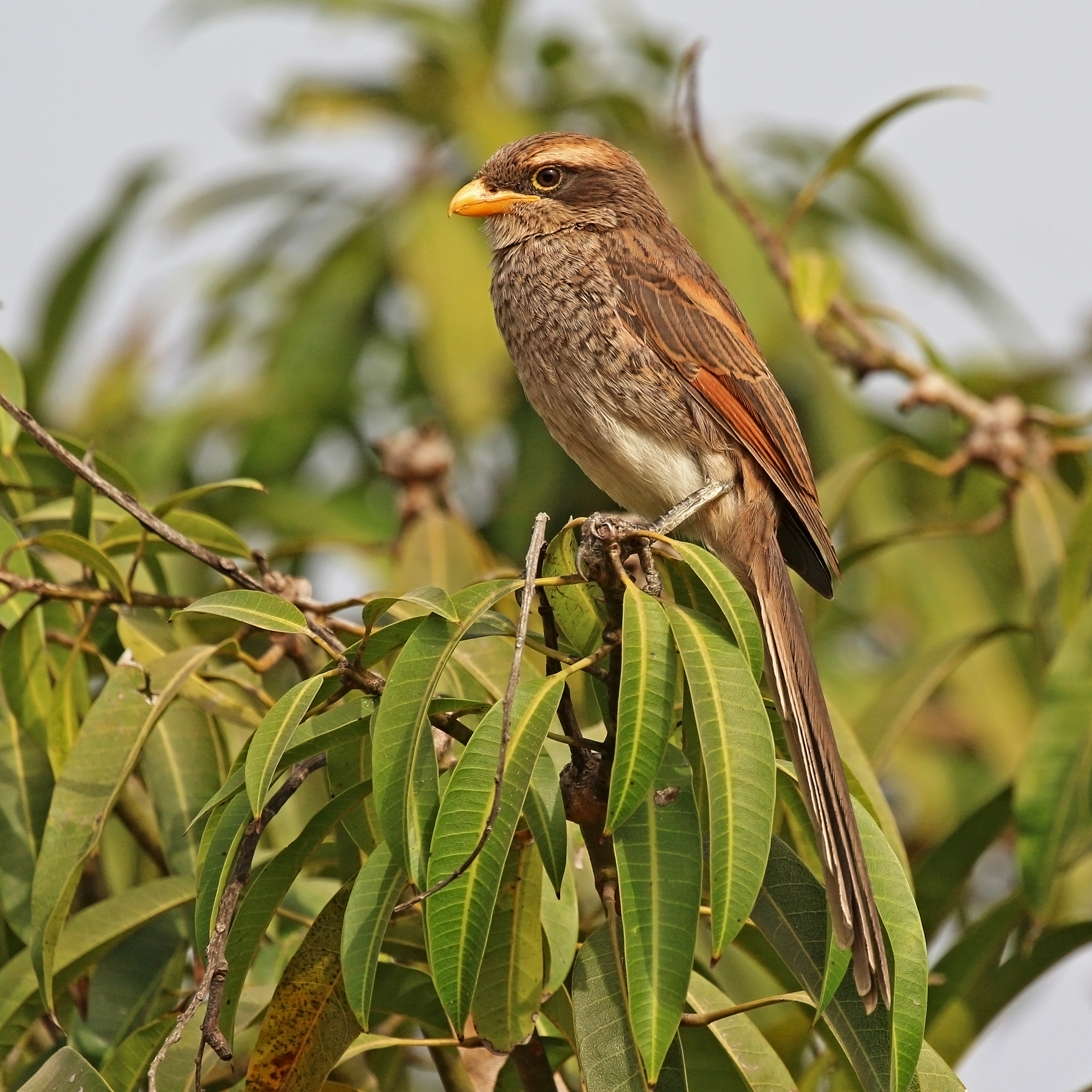
Yellow-billed shrike

Order: Passeriformes Family: Laniidae

Shrikes are passerine birds known for their habit of catching other birds and small animals and impaling the uneaten portions of their bodies on thorns. A shrike's beak is hooked, like that of a typical bird of prey.

- Red-backed shrike, Lanius collurio (A)
- Red-tailed shrike, Lanius phoenicuroides
- Isabelline shrike, Lanius isabellinus (A)
- Great gray shrike, Lanius excubitor (A)
- Yellow-billed shrike, Lanius corvinus
- Woodchat shrike, Lanius senator

== Crows, jays, and magpies ==
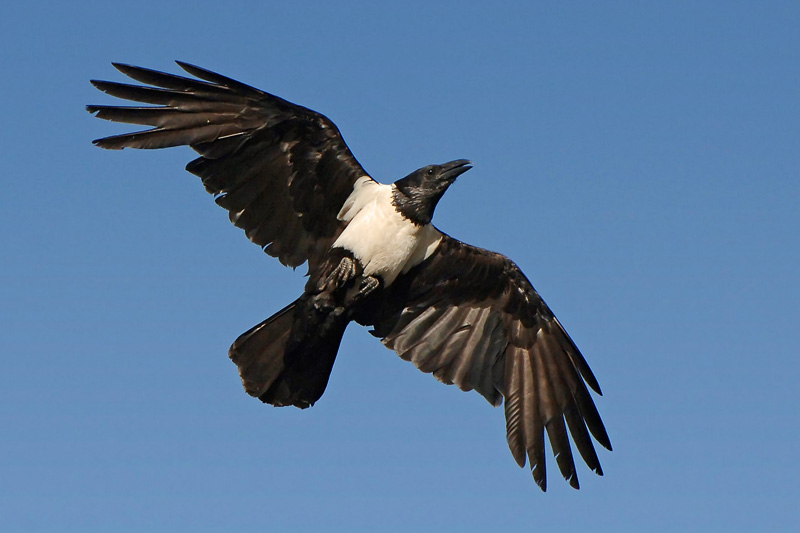
Pied crows are abundant along the coast, less common upriver.

Order: Passeriformes Family: Corvidae

The family Corvidae includes crows, ravens, jays, choughs, magpies, treepies, nutcrackers, and ground jays. Corvids are above average in size among the Passeriformes, and some of the larger species show high levels of intelligence.

- Piapiac, Ptilostomus afer
- Pied crow, Corvus albus
- Brown-necked raven, Corvus ruficollis (A)

== Hyliotas ==
Order: Passeriformes Family: Hyliotidae

The members of this small family, all of genus Hyliota, are birds of the forest canopy. They tend to feed in mixed-species flocks.

- Yellow-bellied hyliota, Hyliota flavigaster
- Southern hyliota, Hyliota australis

== Fairy flycatchers ==
Order: Passeriformes Family: Stenostiridae

Most of the species of this small family are found in Africa, though a few inhabit tropical Asia. They are not closely related to other birds called "flycatchers".

- African blue flycatcher, Elminia longicauda

== Tits, chickadees, and titmice ==
Order: Passeriformes Family: Paridae

The Paridae are mainly small stocky woodland species with short stout bills. Some have crests. They are adaptable birds, with a mixed diet including seeds and insects.

- White-shouldered black-tit, Melaniparus guineensis

== Penduline-tits ==
Order: Passeriformes Family: Remizidae

The penduline-tits are a group of small passerine birds related to the true tits. They are insectivores.

- Yellow penduline-tit, Anthoscopus parvulus

== Larks ==
Order: Passeriformes Family: Alaudidae

- Rufous-rumped lark, Pinarocorys erythropygia (A)
- Dusky lark, Pinarocorys nigricans (A)
- Chestnut-backed sparrow-lark, Eremopterix leucotis
- Black-crowned sparrow-lark, Eremopterix nigriceps (A)
- Flappet lark, Mirafra rufocinnamomea
- Kordofan lark, Mirafra cordofanica
- Horsfield's bushlark, Mirafra javanica
- Temminck's lark, Eremophila bilopha (A)
- Sun lark, Galerida modesta
- Crested lark, Galerida cristata

== Nicators ==
Order: Passeriformes Family: Nicatoridae

The nicators are shrike-like, with hooked bills. They are endemic to sub-Saharan Africa.

- Western nicator, Nicator chloris

== African warblers ==
Order: Passeriformes Family: Macrosphenidae

African warblers are small to medium-sized insectivores which are found in a wide variety of habitats south of the Sahara.

- Green crombec, Sylvietta virens
- Lemon-bellied crombec, Sylvietta denti (A)
- Northern crombec, Sylvietta brachyura
- Green hylia, Hylia prasina

== Cisticolas and allies ==
Order: Passeriformes Family: Cisticolidae

The Cisticolidae are warblers found mainly in warmer southern regions of the Old World. They are generally very small birds of drab brown or grey appearance found in open country such as grassland or scrub.

- Yellow-bellied eremomela, Eremomela icteropygialis
- Senegal eremomela, Eremomela pusilla
- Green-backed eremomela, Camaroptera brachyura
- Olive-green camaroptera, Camaroptera chloronota
- Yellow-breasted apalis, Apalis flavida
- Tawny-flanked prinia, Prinia subflava
- River prinia, Prinia fluviatilis
- Oriole warbler, Hypergerus atriceps
- Red-faced cisticola, Cisticola erythrops
- Singing cisticola, Cisticola cantans
- Whistling cisticola, Cisticola lateralis
- Dorst's cisticola, Cisticola guinea
- Winding cisticola, Cisticola marginatus
- Croaking cisticola, Cisticola natalensis
- Siffling cisticola, Cisticola brachypterus
- Rufous cisticola, Cisticola rufus
- Zitting cisticola, Cisticola juncidis
- Desert cisticola, Cisticola aridulus
- Black-backed cisticola, Cisticola eximius

== Reed warblers and allies ==
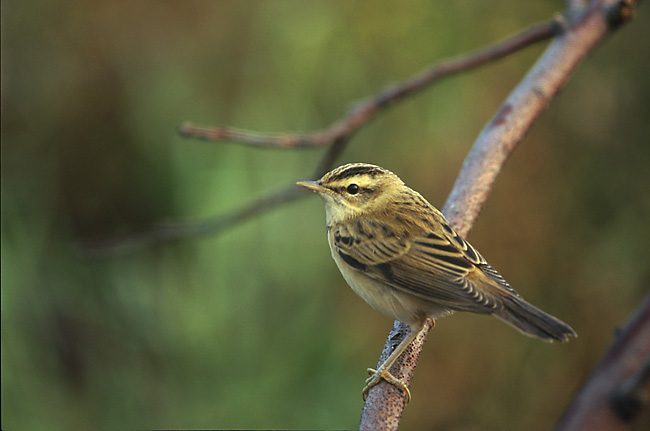
Sedge warbler (Acrocephalus schoenobaenus)

Order: Passeriformes Family: Acrocephalidae

The members of this family are usually rather large for "warblers". Most are rather plain olivaceous brown above with much yellow to beige below. They are usually found in open woodland, reedbeds, or tall grass. The family occurs mostly in southern to western Eurasia and surroundings, but it also ranges far into the Pacific, with some species in Africa.

- Eastern olivaceous warbler, Iduna pallida
- Western olivaceous warbler, Iduna opaca
- Melodious warbler, Hippolais polyglotta
- Icterine warbler, Hippolais icterina (A)
- Moustached warbler, Acrocephalus melanopogon (A)
- Sedge warbler, Acrocephalus schoenobaenus
- Marsh warbler, Acrocephalus palustris (A)
- Common reed warbler, Acrocephalus scirpaceus
- Greater swamp warbler, Acrocephalus rufescens
- Great reed warbler, Acrocephalus arundinaceus (A)

== Grassbirds and allies ==
Order: Passeriformes Family: Locustellidae

Locustellidae are a family of small insectivorous songbirds found mainly in Eurasia, Africa, and the Australian region. They are smallish birds with tails that are usually long and pointed, and tend to be drab brownish or buffy all over.

- Savi's warbler, Locustella luscinioides (A)
- Common grasshopper-warbler, Locustella naevia (A)

== Swallows ==
Order: Passeriformes Family: Hirundinidae

The family Hirundinidae is adapted to aerial feeding. They have a slender streamlined body, long pointed wings, and a short bill with a wide gape. The feet are adapted to perching rather than walking, and the front toes are partially joined at the base.

- Plain martin, Riparia paludicola
- Bank swallow, Riparia riparia
- Banded martin, Neophedina cincta (A)
- Eurasian crag-martin, Ptyonoprogne rupestris
- Barn swallow, Hirundo rustica
- Red-chested swallow, Hirundo lucida
- Ethiopian swallow, Hirundo aethiopica
- Wire-tailed swallow, Hirundo smithii
- Pied-winged swallow, Hirundo leucosoma
- Red-rumped swallow, Cecropis daurica
- Lesser striped swallow, Cecropis abyssinica (A)
- Rufous-chested swallow, Cecropis semirufa
- Mosque swallow, Cecropis senegalensis
- Common house-martin, Delichon urbicum
- Fanti sawwing, Psalidoprocne obscura
- Gray-rumped swallow, Pseudhirundo griseopyga (A)

== Bulbuls ==
Order: Passeriformes Family: Pycnonotidae

Bulbuls are medium-sized songbirds. Some are colourful with yellow, red or orange vents, cheeks, throats or supercilia, but most are drab, with uniform olive-brown to black plumage. Some species have distinct crests.

- Gray-headed bristlebill, Bleda canicapillus
- Sjöstedt's greenbul, Baeopogon clamans
- Yellow-throated greenbul, Atimastillas flavicollis
- Swamp greenbul, Thescelocichla leucopleura (A)
- Red-tailed greenbul, Criniger calurus
- Little greenbul, Eurillas virens
- Leaf-love, Phyllastrephus scandens
- White-throated greenbul, Phyllastrephus albigularis
- Common bulbul, Pycnonotus barbatus

== Leaf warblers ==
Order: Passeriformes Family: Phylloscopidae

Leaf warblers are a family of small insectivorous birds found mostly in Eurasia and ranging into Wallacea and Africa. The species are of various sizes, often green-plumaged above and yellow below, or more subdued with greyish-green to greyish-brown colours.

- Wood warbler, Phylloscopus sibilatrix (A)
- Western Bonelli's warbler, Phylloscopus bonelli
- Yellow-browed warbler, Phylloscopus inornatus (A)
- Willow warbler, Phylloscopus trochilus
- Common chiffchaff, Phylloscopus collybita
- Iberian chiffchaff, Phylloscopus ibericus (A)

== Sylviid warblers, parrotbills, and allies ==
Order: Passeriformes Family: Sylviidae

The family Sylviidae is a group of small insectivorous passerine birds. As another common name, Old World warblers, implies, they mainly occur as breeding species in Europe, Asia and, to a lesser extent, Africa. Most are of generally undistinguished appearance, but many have distinctive songs.

- Eurasian blackcap, Sylvia atricapilla
- Garden warbler, Sylvia borin
- Barred warbler, Curruca nisoria (A)
- Lesser whitethroat, Curruca curruca (A)
- Western Orphean warbler, Curruca hortensis (A)
- Rüppell's warbler, Curruca ruppeli (A)
- Western subalpine warbler, Curruca iberiae
- Eastern subalpine warbler, Curruca cantillans
- Greater whitethroat, Curruca communis
- Spectacled warbler, Curruca conspicillata (A)

== White-eyes, yuhinas, and allies ==
Order: Passeriformes Family: Zosteropidae

The white-eyes are small and mostly undistinguished, their plumage above being generally some dull colour like greenish-olive, but some species have a white or bright yellow throat, breast, or lower parts, and several have buff flanks. As their name suggests, many species have a white ring around each eye.

- Northern yellow white-eye, Zosterops senegalensis

== Ground babblers and allies ==
Order: Passeriformes Family: Pellorneidae

These small to medium-sized songbirds have soft fluffy plumage but are otherwise rather diverse. Members of the genus Illadopsis are found in forests, but some other genera are birds of scrublands.

- Brown illadopsis, Illadopsis fulvescens (A)
- Puvel's illadopsis, Illadopsis puveli

== Laughingthrushes and allies ==
Order: Passeriformes Family: Leiothrichidae

The members of this family are diverse in size and colouration, though those of genus Turdoides tend to be brown or greyish. The family is found in Africa, India, and southeast Asia.

- Capuchin babbler, Turdoides atripennis
- Blackcap babbler, Turdoides reinwardtii
- Brown babbler, Turdoides plebejus

== Treecreepers ==
Order: Passeriformes Family: Certhiidae

Treecreepers are small woodland birds, brown above and white below. They have thin pointed down-curved bills, which they use to extricate insects from bark. They have stiff tail feathers, like woodpeckers, which they use to support themselves on vertical trees.

- African spotted creeper, Salpornis salvadori

== Oxpeckers ==
Order: Passeriformes Family: Buphagidae

As both the English and scientific names of these birds imply, they feed on ectoparasites, primarily ticks, found on large mammals.

- Yellow-billed oxpecker, Buphagus africanus

== Starlings ==
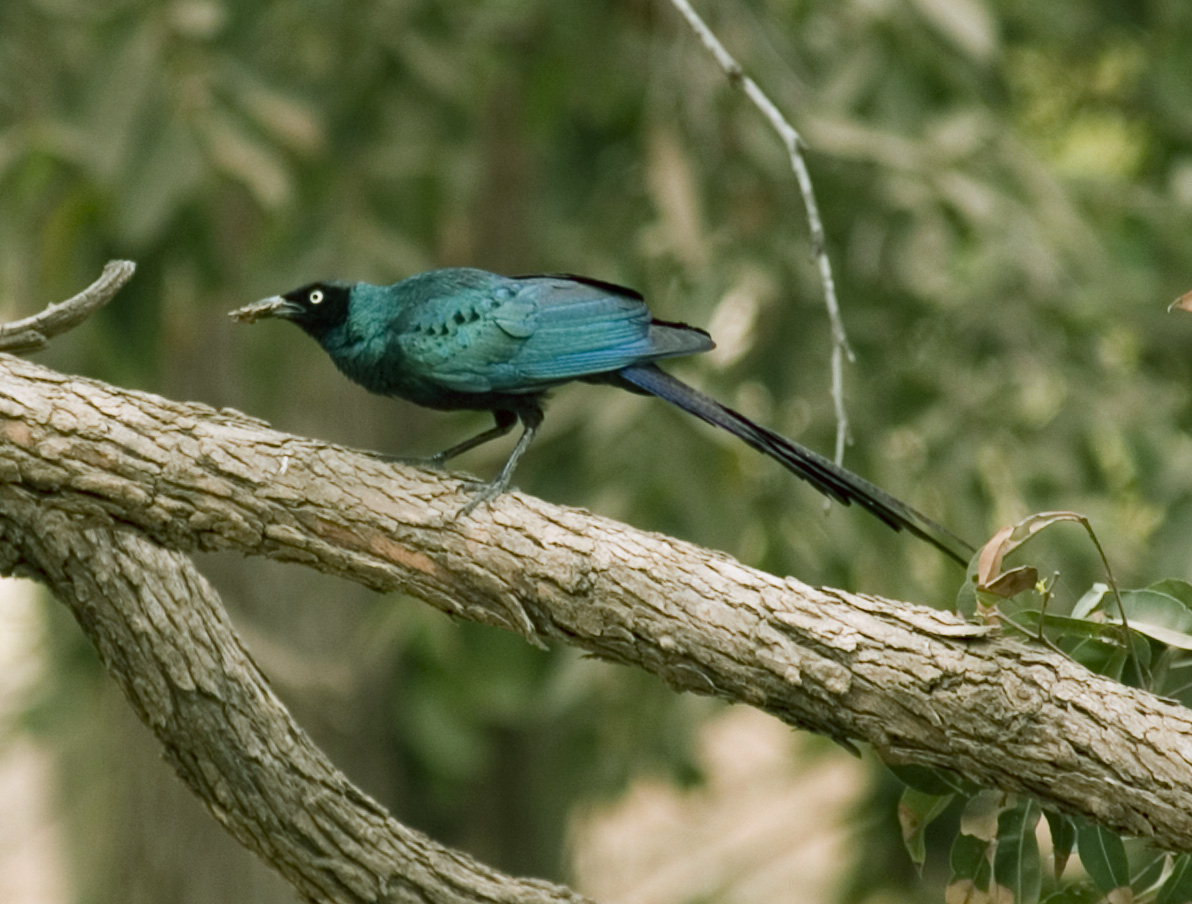
The long-tailed glossy-starling is common and widespread throughout the country.

Order: Passeriformes Family: Sturnidae

Starlings are small to medium-sized passerine birds. Their flight is strong and direct and they are very gregarious. Their preferred habitat is fairly open country. They eat insects and fruit. Plumage is typically dark with a metallic sheen.

- Wattled starling, Creatophora cinerea (A)
- Violet-backed starling, Cinnyricinclus leucogaster
- Neumann's starling, Onychognathus neumanni
- Long-tailed glossy starling, Lamprotornis caudatus
- Splendid starling, Lamprotornis splendidus
- Chestnut-bellied starling, Lamprotornis pulcher
- Lesser blue-eared starling, Lamprotornis chloropterus
- Greater blue-eared starling, Lamprotornis chalybaeus
- Purple starling, Lamprotornis purpureus
- Bronze-tailed starling, Lamprotornis chalcurus

== Thrushes and allies ==
Order: Passeriformes Family: Turdidae

The thrushes are a group of passerine birds that occur mainly in the Old World. They are plump, soft plumaged, small to medium-sized insectivores or sometimes omnivores, often feeding on the ground. Many have attractive songs.

- African thrush, Turdus pelios

== Old World flycatchers ==
Order: Passeriformes Family: Muscicapidae

Old World flycatchers are a large group of small passerine birds native to the Old World. They are mainly small arboreal insectivores. The appearance of these birds is highly varied, but they mostly have weak songs and harsh calls.

- Spotted flycatcher, Muscicapa striata
- Swamp flycatcher, Muscicapa aquatica
- Pale flycatcher, Agricola pallidus
- Gray tit-flycatcher, Fraseria plumbea
- Northern black-flycatcher, Melaenornis edolioides
- White-tailed alethe, Alethe diademata
- Black scrub-robin, Cercotrichas podobe
- Rufous-tailed scrub-robin, Cercotrichas galactotes (A)
- Snowy-crowned robin-chat, Cossypha niveicapilla
- White-crowned robin-chat, Cossypha albicapilla
- Common nightingale, Luscinia megarhynchos
- Bluethroat, Luscinia svecica (A)
- European pied flycatcher, Ficedula hypoleuca
- Common redstart, Phoenicurus phoenicurus
- Rufous-tailed rock-thrush, Monticola saxatilis
- Blue rock-thrush, Monticola solitarius
- Whinchat, Saxicola rubetra
- African stonechat, Saxicola torquatus (A)
- Northern anteater-chat, Myrmecocichla aethiops
- Northern wheatear, Oenanthe oenanthe
- Isabelline wheatear, Oenanthe isabellina (A)
- Western black-eared wheatear, Oenanthe hispanica (A)
- White-fronted black-chat, Oenanthe albifrons
- Blackstart, Oenanthe melanura (A)
- White-crowned wheatear, Oenanthe leucopyga (A)

== Sunbirds and spiderhunters ==
Order: Passeriformes Family: Nectariniidae

The sunbirds and spiderhunters are very small passerine birds which feed largely on nectar, although they will also take insects, especially when feeding young. Flight is fast and direct on their short wings. Most species can take nectar by hovering like a hummingbird, but usually perch to feed.

- Mouse-brown sunbird, Anthreptes gabonicus
- Western violet-backed sunbird, Anthreptes longuemarei
- Collared sunbird, Hedydipna collaris
- Pygmy sunbird, Hedydipna platura
- Green-headed sunbird, Cyanomitra verticalis
- Scarlet-chested sunbird, Chalcomitra senegalensis
- Olive-bellied sunbird, Cinnyris chloropygia
- Beautiful sunbird, Cinnyris pulchellus
- Splendid sunbird, Cinnyris coccinigaster
- Variable sunbird, Cinnyris venustus
- Copper sunbird, Cinnyris cupreus

== Weavers and allies ==
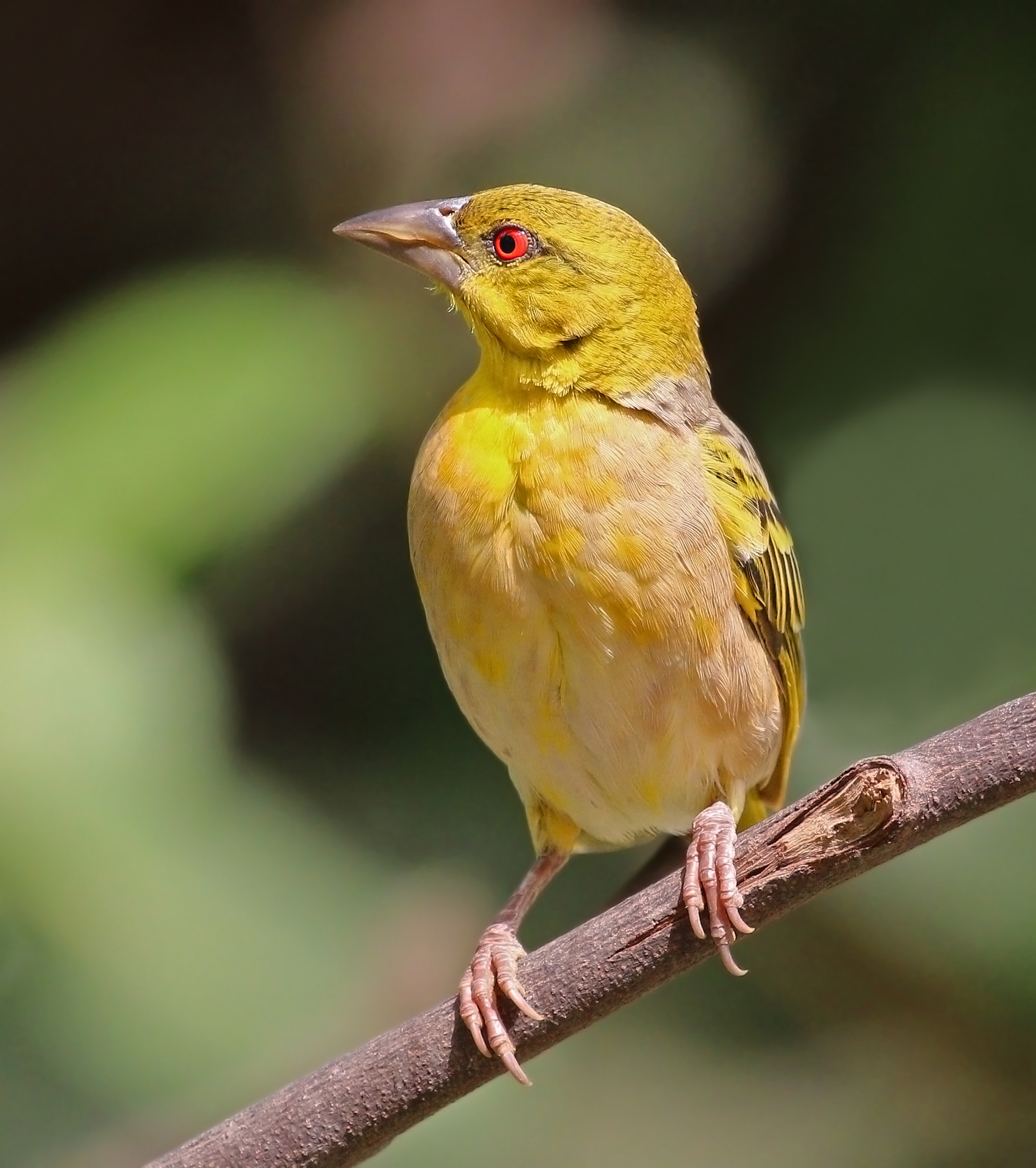
Village weaver (Ploceus cucullatus cucullatus) female

Order: Passeriformes Family: Ploceidae

The weavers are small passerine birds related to the finches. They are seed-eating birds with rounded conical bills. The males of many species are brightly coloured, usually in red or yellow and black. Some species show variation in colour only in the breeding season.

- White-billed buffalo-weaver, Bubalornis albirostris
- Speckle-fronted weaver, Sporopipes frontalis
- Chestnut-crowned sparrow-weaver, Plocepasser superciliosus
- Red-headed weaver, Anaplectes rubriceps (A)
- Little weaver, Ploceus luteolus
- Olive-naped weaver, Ploceus brachypterus
- Vitelline masked weaver, Ploceus velatus
- Heuglin's masked weaver, Ploceus heuglini
- Chestnut-and-black weaver, Ploceus castaneofuscus
- Village weaver, Ploceus cucullatus
- Black-headed weaver, Ploceus melanocephalus
- Red-headed quelea, Quelea erythrops
- Red-billed quelea, Quelea quelea
- Northern red bishop, Euplectes franciscanus
- Southern red bishop, Euplectes orix
- Black-winged bishop, Euplectes hordeaceus
- Yellow-crowned bishop, Euplectes afer
- Yellow-mantled widowbird, Euplectes macroura
- Red-collared widowbird, Euplectes ardens (A)

== Waxbills and allies ==
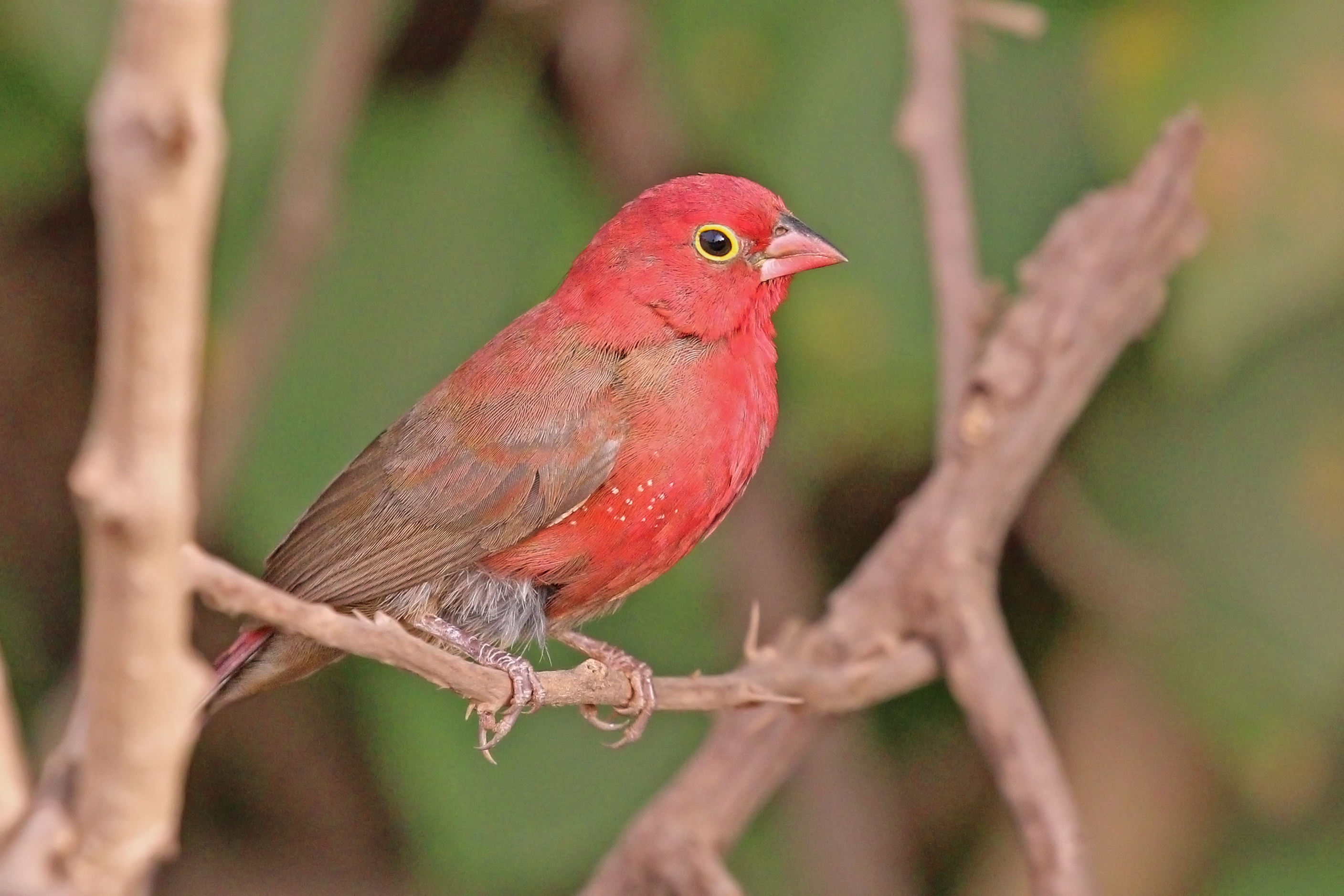
Red-billed firefinches forage on the ground in small family groups, often with one or more village indigobird foster chicks in tow.

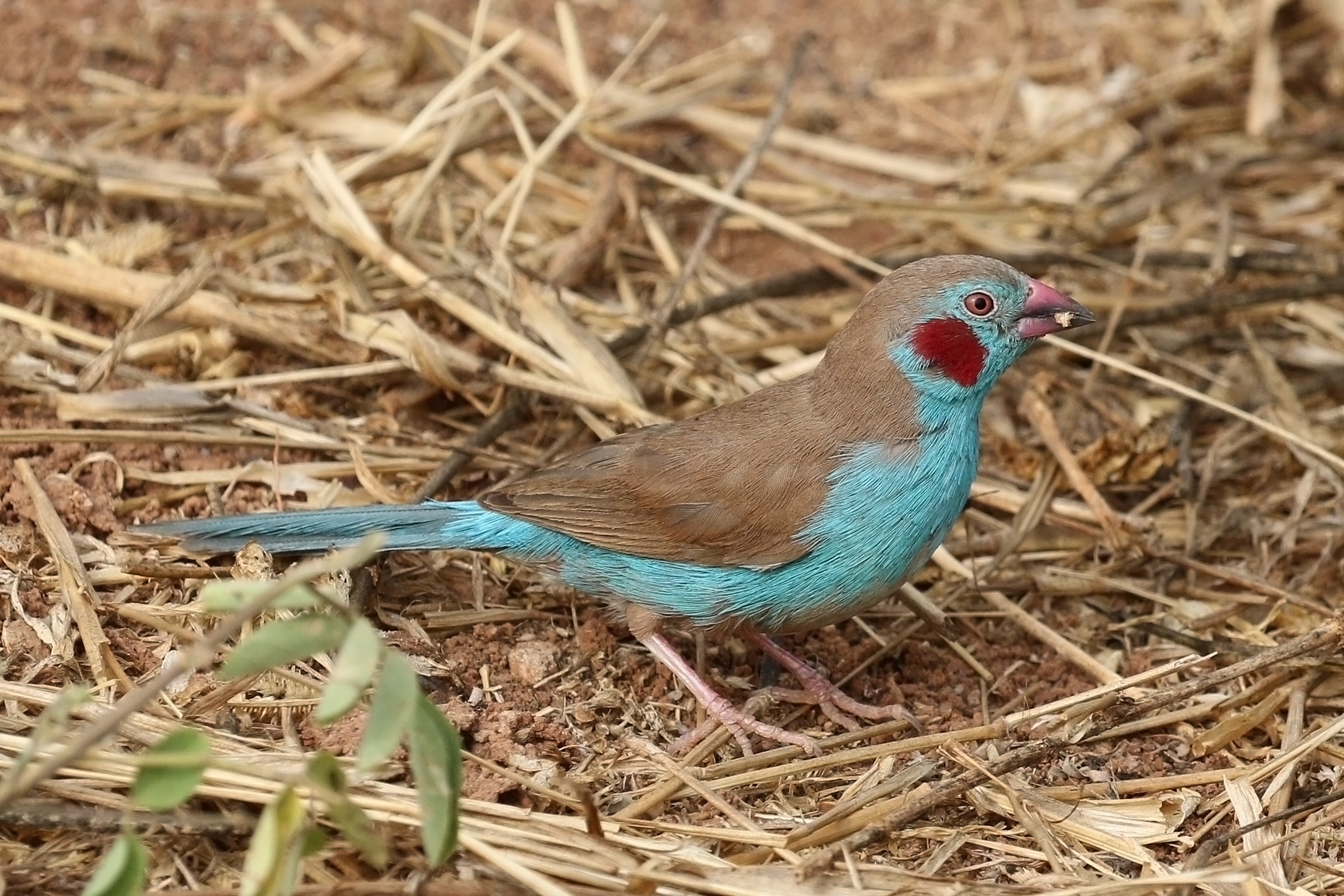
The ground-feeding red-cheeked cordon-bleu is widespread throughout the country.

Order: Passeriformes Family: Estrildidae

The estrildid finches are small passerine birds of the Old World tropics and Australasia. They are gregarious and often colonial seed eaters with short thick but pointed bills. They are all similar in structure and habits, but have wide variation in plumage colours and patterns.

- Bronze mannikin, Spermestes cucullata
- Magpie mannikin, Spermestes fringilloides
- African silverbill, Euodice cantans
- Indian silverbill, Euodice malabarica (I)
- Chestnut-breasted nigrita, Nigrita bicolor (A)
- Gray-headed oliveback, Delacourella capistrata (A)
- Lavender waxbill, Glaucestrilda caerulescens
- Orange-cheeked waxbill, Estrilda melpoda
- Black-rumped waxbill, Estrilda troglodytes
- Quailfinch, Ortygospiza atricollis
- Cut-throat, Amadina fasciata
- Zebra waxbill, Amandava subflava
- Red-cheeked cordonbleu, Uraeginthus bengalus
- Western bluebill, Spermophaga haematina
- Crimson seedcracker, Pyrenestes sanguineus
- Black-bellied seedcracker, Pyrenestes ostrinus (A)
- Green-winged pytilia, Pytilia melba (A)
- Red-winged pytilia, Pytilia phoenicoptera
- Dybowski's twinspot, Euschistospiza dybowskii
- Red-billed firefinch, Lagonosticta senegala
- Bar-breasted firefinch, Lagonosticta rufopicta
- Black-faced firefinch, Lagonosticta larvata

== Indigobirds ==
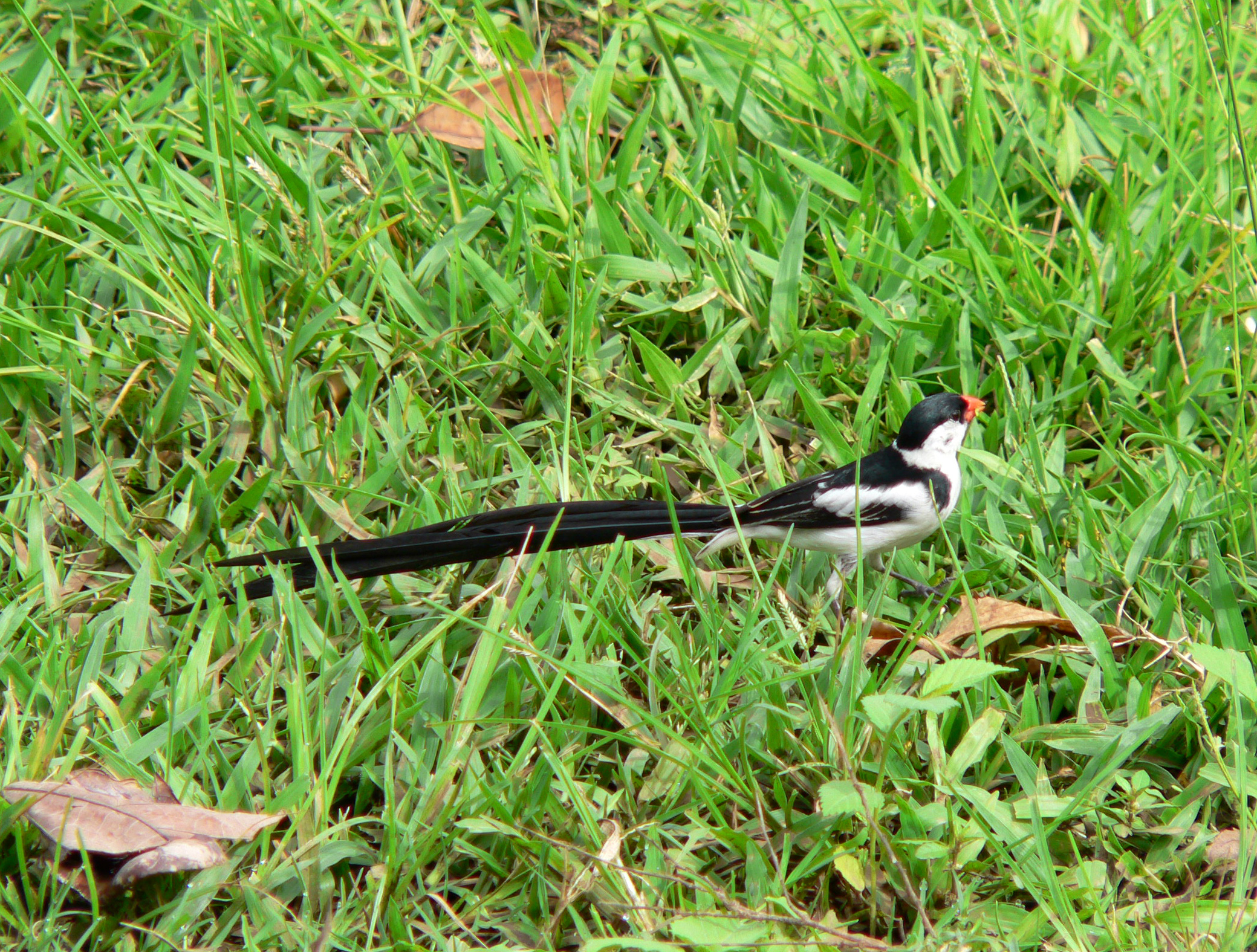
The pin-tailed whydah (male pictured above) is a brood parasite of various waxbill species.

Order: Passeriformes Family: Viduidae

The indigobirds are finch-like species which usually have black or indigo predominating in their plumage. All are brood parasites which lay their eggs in the nests of waxbills and other estrildid finches.

- Pin-tailed whydah, Vidua macroura
- Sahel paradise-whydah, Vidua orientalis
- Exclamatory paradise-whydah, Vidua interjecta
- Village indigobird, Vidua chalybeata
- Wilson's indigobird, Vidua wilsoni (A)
- Quailfinch indigobird, Vidua nigeriae
- Baka indigobird, Vidua larvaticola
- Cameroon indigobird, Vidua camerunensis
- Parasitic weaver, Anomalospiza imberbis (A)

== Old World sparrows ==
Order: Passeriformes Family: Passeridae

Sparrows are small passerine birds. In general, sparrows tend to be small, plump, brown or grey birds with short tails and short powerful beaks. Sparrows are seed eaters, but they also consume small insects.

- House sparrow, Passer domesticus (I)
- Northern gray-headed sparrow, Passer griseus
- Sudan golden sparrow, Passer luteus
- Sahel bush sparrow, Gymnoris dentata

== Wagtails and pipits ==
Order: Passeriformes Family: Motacillidae

Motacillidae is a family of small passerine birds with medium to long tails. They include the wagtails, longclaws, and pipits. They are slender ground-feeding insectivores of open country.

- Western yellow wagtail, Motacilla flava
- African pied wagtail, Motacilla aguimp (A)
- White wagtail, Motacilla alba
- Tawny pipit, Anthus campestris
- Plain-backed pipit, Anthus leucophrys
- Tree pipit, Anthus trivialis
- Red-throated pipit, Anthus cervinus
- Yellow-throated longclaw, Macronyx croceus

== Finches, euphonias, and allies ==
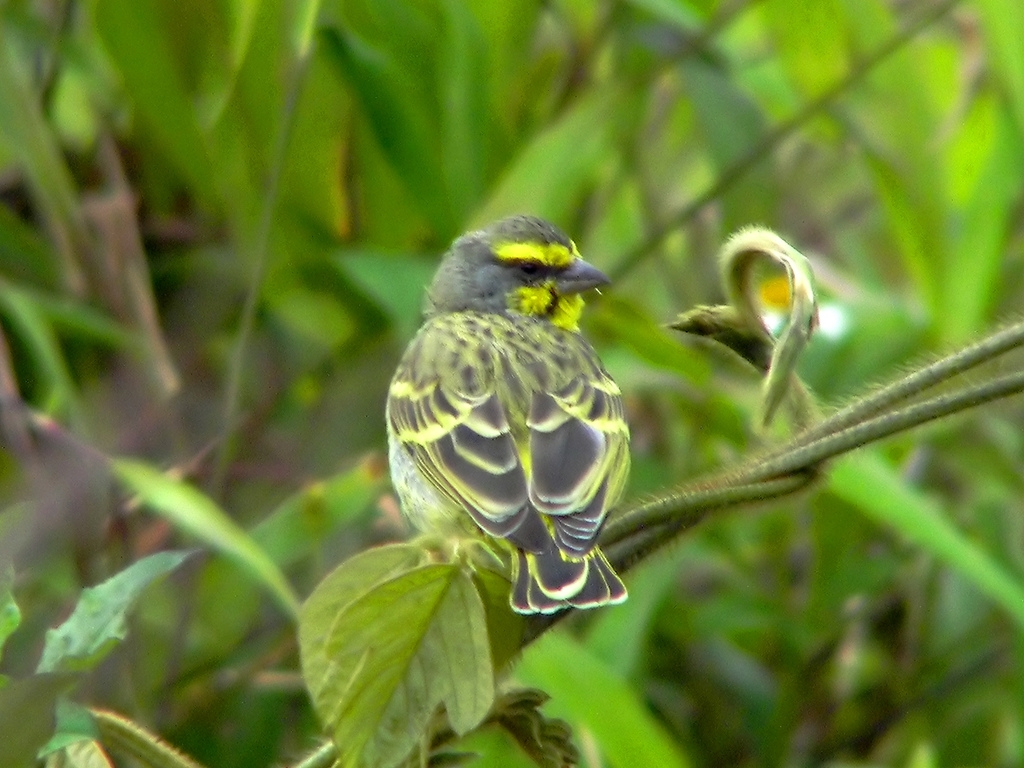
The yellow-fronted canary is a common resident breeder throughout the country.

Order: Passeriformes Family: Fringillidae

Finches are seed-eating passerine birds, that are small to moderately large and have a strong beak, usually conical and in some species very large. All have twelve tail feathers and nine primaries. These birds have a bouncing flight with alternating bouts of flapping and gliding on closed wings, and most sing well.

- White-rumped seedeater, Crithagra leucopygius
- Yellow-fronted canary, Crithagra mozambicus

== Old World buntings ==
Order: Passeriformes Family: Emberizidae

The emberizids are a large family of passerine birds. They are seed-eating birds with distinctively shaped bills. Many emberizid species have distinctive head patterns.

- Brown-rumped bunting, Emberiza affinis
- Ortolan bunting, Emberiza hortulana (A)
- Golden-breasted bunting, Emberiza flaviventris (A)
- Gosling's bunting, Emberiza goslingi
- House bunting, Emberiza sahari (A)
- Striolated bunting, Emberiza striolata (A)

== See also ==
- List of regional bird lists
