= List of birds of Tanzania =

This is a list of the bird species recorded in Tanzania. The avifauna of Tanzania included a total of 1160 confirmed species as of October 2024. Of them, 29 are endemic, and four have been introduced by humans. One additional species is hypothetical as defined below; it and two proposed endemic species are not included in the counts. Unless otherwise noted, the list is that of Avibase.

This list's taxonomic treatment (designation and sequence of orders, families and species) and nomenclature (English and scientific names) are those of The Clements Checklist of Birds of the World, 2022 edition.

The following tags highlight several categories of occurrence other than regular migrants and non-endemic residents. The notes of population status are from the Avibase Bird Checklists of the World.

- (A) Accidental - a species that rarely or accidentally occurs in Tanzania (also called a vagrant)
- (E) Endemic - a species endemic to Tanzania
- (I) Introduced - a species introduced to Tanzania as a consequence, direct or indirect, of human actions
- (H) Hypothetical - a species possibly present but which has not been documented

== Ostriches ==
Order: Struthioniformes Family: Struthionidae

The ostriches are flightless birds native to Africa, and are the largest living species of bird. They are distinctive in their appearance, with a long neck and legs and the ability to run at high speeds.

- Common ostrich, Struthio camelus

== Ducks, geese, and waterfowl ==
Order: Anseriformes Family: Anatidae

Anatidae includes the ducks and most duck-like waterfowl, such as geese and swans. These birds are adapted to an aquatic existence with webbed feet, flattened bills, and feathers that are excellent at shedding water due to an oily coating.

- White-faced whistling-duck, Dendrocygna viduata
- Fulvous whistling-duck, Dendrocygna bicolor
- White-backed duck, Thalassornis leuconotus
- Knob-billed duck, Sarkidiornis melanotos
- Egyptian goose, Alopochen aegyptiaca
- Spur-winged goose, Plectropterus gambensis
- African pygmy-goose, Nettapus auritus
- Garganey, Spatula querquedula
- Blue-billed teal, Spatula hottentota
- Cape shoveler, Spatula smithii (A)
- Northern shoveler, Spatula clypeata
- Gadwall, Mareca strepera
- Eurasian wigeon, Mareca penelope
- African black duck, Anas sparsa
- Yellow-billed duck, Anas undulata
- Cape teal, Anas capensis
- Red-billed duck, Anas erythrorhyncha
- Northern pintail, Anas acuta
- Green-winged teal, Anas crecca
- Southern pochard, Netta erythrophthalma
- Common pochard, Aythya ferina (A) (vulnerable)
- Tufted duck, Aythya fuligula
- Maccoa duck, Oxyura maccoa (vulnerable)

== Guineafowl ==
Order: Galliformes Family: Numididae

Guineafowl are a group of African seed-eating, ground-nesting birds that resemble partridges, but with featherless heads and spangled grey plumage.

- Helmeted guineafowl, Numida meleagris
- Vulturine guineafowl, Acryllium vulturinum
- Eastern crested guineafowl, Guttera pucherani
- Southern crested guineafowl, Guttera edouardi

== Pheasants, grouse, and allies ==
Order: Galliformes Family: Phasianidae

The Phasianidae are a family of terrestrial birds which consists of quails, partridges, snowcocks, francolins, spurfowls, tragopans, monals, pheasants, peafowls, and jungle fowls. In general, they are plump (although they vary in size) and have broad, relatively short wings.

- Udzungwa partridge, Xenoperdix udzungwensis (E) (endangered)
- Rubeho forest partridge, Xenoperdix obscuratus (E) (endangered)
- Latham's francolin, Peliperdix lathami
- Crested francolin, Ortygornis sephaena
- Coqui francolin, Campocolinus coqui
- Ring-necked francolin, Scleroptila streptophora
- Red-winged francolin, Scleroptila levaillantii (near-threatened)
- Shelley's francolin, Scleroptila shelleyi
- Blue quail, Synoicus adansonii
- Common quail, Coturnix coturnix
- Harlequin quail, Coturnix delegorguei
- Hildebrandt's francolin, Pternistis hildebrandti
- Scaly francolin, Pternistis squamatus
- Yellow-necked francolin, Pternistis leucoscepus
- Gray-breasted francolin, Pternistis rufopictus (E)
- Red-necked francolin, Pternistis afer

== Flamingos ==
Order: Phoenicopteriformes Family: Phoenicopteridae

Flamingos are gregarious wading birds, usually 3 to 5 feet (0.9 to 1.5 m) tall, found in both the Western and Eastern Hemispheres. Flamingos filter-feed on shellfish and algae. Their oddly shaped beaks are specially adapted to separate mud and silt from the food they consume and, uniquely, are used upside-down.

- Greater flamingo, Phoenicopterus roseus
- Lesser flamingo, Phoeniconaias minor (near-threatened)

== Grebes ==
Order: Podicipediformes Family: Podicipedidae

Grebes are small to medium-large freshwater diving birds. They have lobed toes and are excellent swimmers and divers. However, they have their feet placed far back on the body, making them quite ungainly on land.

- Little grebe, Tachybaptus ruficollis
- Great crested grebe, Podiceps cristatus
- Eared grebe, Podiceps nigricollis

== Pigeons and doves ==
Order: Columbiformes Family: Columbidae

Pigeons and doves are stout-bodied birds with short necks and short slender bills with a fleshy cere.

- Rock pigeon, Columba livia (I)
- Speckled pigeon, Columba guinea
- Afep pigeon, Columba unicincta (A)
- Rameron pigeon, Columba arquatrix
- Delegorgue's pigeon, Columba delegorguei
- Lemon dove, Columba larvata
- European turtle-dove, Streptopelia turtur (A) (vulnerable)
- Dusky turtle-dove, Streptopelia lugens
- Mourning collared-dove, Streptopelia decipiens
- Red-eyed dove, Streptopelia semitorquata
- Ring-necked dove, Streptopelia capicola
- Laughing dove, Streptopelia senegalensis
- Emerald-spotted wood-dove, Turtur chalcospilos
- Blue-spotted wood-dove, Turtur afer
- Tambourine dove, Turtur tympanistria
- Namaqua dove, Oena capensis
- Pemba green-pigeon, Treron pembaensis (E) (vulnerable)
- African green-pigeon, Treron calvus

== Sandgrouse ==
Order: Pterocliformes Family: Pteroclidae

Sandgrouse have small pigeon-like heads and necks, but sturdy compact bodies. They have long pointed wings and sometimes tails and a fast direct flight. Flocks fly to watering holes at dawn and dusk. Their legs are feathered down to the toes.

- Chestnut-bellied sandgrouse, Pterocles exustus
- Yellow-throated sandgrouse, Pterocles gutturalis
- Black-faced sandgrouse, Pterocles decoratus

== Bustards ==
Order: Otidiformes Family: Otididae

Bustards are large terrestrial birds mainly associated with dry open country and steppes in the Old World. They are omnivorous and nest on the ground. They walk steadily on strong legs and big toes, pecking for food as they go. They have long broad wings with "fingered" wingtips and striking patterns in flight. Many have interesting mating displays.

- Kori bustard, Ardeotis kori (near-threatened)
- Denham's bustard, Neotis denhami (near-threatened)
- White-bellied bustard, Eupodotis senegalensis
- Buff-crested bustard, Lophotis gindiana
- Black-bellied bustard, Lissotis melanogaster
- Hartlaub's bustard, Lissotis hartlaubii

== Turacos ==
Order: Musophagiformes Family: Musophagidae

The turacos, plantain-eaters, and go-away-birds make up the family Musophagidae. They are medium-sized arboreal birds. The turacos and plantain-eaters are brightly colored, usually in blue, green, or purple. The go-away birds are mostly gray and white.

- Great blue turaco, Corythaeola cristata
- Livingstone's turaco, Tauraco livingstonii
- Schalow's turaco, Tauraco schalowi
- Black-billed turaco, Tauraco schuettii
- Fischer's turaco, Tauraco fischeri (near-threatened)
- Hartlaub's turaco, Tauraco hartlaubi
- Purple-crested turaco, Tauraco porphyreolophus
- Ross's turaco, Musophaga rossae
- Bare-faced go-away-bird, Corythaixoides personatus
- Gray go-away-bird, Corythaixoides concolor
- White-bellied go-away-bird, Corythaixoides leucogaster
- Eastern plantain-eater, Crinifer zonurus

== Cuckoos ==
Order: Cuculiformes Family: Cuculidae

The family Cuculidae includes cuckoos, roadrunners, and anis. These birds are of variable size with slender bodies, long tails, and strong legs. The Old World cuckoos are brood parasites.

- Senegal coucal, Centropus senegalensis
- Blue-headed coucal, Centropus monachus
- Coppery-tailed coucal, Centropus cupreicaudus
- White-browed coucal, Centropus superciliosus
- Black coucal, Centropus grillii
- Blue malkoha, Ceuthmochares aereus
- Green malkoha, Ceuthmochares australis
- Great spotted cuckoo, Clamator glandarius
- Levaillant's cuckoo, Clamator levaillantii
- Pied cuckoo, Clamator jacobinus
- Thick-billed cuckoo, Pachycoccyx audeberti
- Dideric cuckoo, Chrysococcyx caprius
- Klaas's cuckoo, Chrysococcyx klaas
- African emerald cuckoo, Chrysococcyx cupreus
- Dusky long-tailed cuckoo, Cercococcyx mechowi
- Barred long-tailed cuckoo, Cercococcyx montanus
- Black cuckoo, Cuculus clamosus
- Red-chested cuckoo, Cuculus solitarius
- Lesser cuckoo, Cuculus poliocephalus
- African cuckoo, Cuculus gularis
- Madagascar cuckoo, Cuculus rochii
- Common cuckoo, Cuculus canorus

== Nightjars and allies ==
Order: Caprimulgiformes Family: Caprimulgidae

Nightjars are medium-sized nocturnal birds that usually nest on the ground. They have long wings, short legs, and very short bills. Most have small feet, of little use for walking, and long pointed wings. Their soft plumage is camouflaged to resemble bark or leaves.

- Pennant-winged nightjar, Caprimulgus vexillarius
- Standard-winged nightjar, Caprimulgus longipennis (A)
- Eurasian nightjar, Caprimulgus europaeus
- Sombre nightjar, Caprimulgus fraenatus
- Rufous-cheeked nightjar, Caprimulgus rufigena (A)
- Nubian nightjar, Caprimulgus nubicus
- Donaldson-Smith's nightjar, Caprimulgus donaldsoni
- Fiery-necked nightjar, Caprimulgus pectoralis
- Montane nightjar, Caprimulgus poliocephalus
- Swamp nightjar, Caprimulgus natalensis
- Plain nightjar, Caprimulgus inornatus
- Freckled nightjar, Caprimulgus tristigma
- Slender-tailed nightjar, Caprimulgus clarus
- Square-tailed nightjar, Caprimulgus fossii

== Swifts ==
Order: Caprimulgiformes Family: Apodidae

Swifts are small birds which spend the majority of their lives flying. These birds have very short legs and never settle voluntarily on the ground, perching instead only on vertical surfaces. Many swifts have long swept-back wings which resemble a crescent or boomerang.

- Mottled spinetail, Telacanthura ussheri
- Bat-like spinetail, Neafrapus boehmi
- Scarce swift, Schoutedenapus myoptilus
- Alpine swift, Apus melba
- Mottled swift, Apus aequatorialis
- Common swift, Apus apus
- Nyanza swift, Apus niansae
- African swift, Apus barbatus
- Forbes-Watson's swift, Apus berliozi (A)
- Little swift, Apus affinis
- Horus swift, Apus horus
- White-rumped swift, Apus caffer
- African palm-swift, Cypsiurus parvus

== Flufftails ==
Order: Gruiformes Family: Sarothruridae

The flufftails are a small family of ground-dwelling birds found only in Madagascar and sub-Saharan Africa.

- White-spotted flufftail, Sarothrura pulchra
- Buff-spotted flufftail, Sarothrura elegans
- Red-chested flufftail, Sarothrura rufa
- Chestnut-headed flufftail, Sarothrura lugens
- Streaky-breasted flufftail, Sarothrura boehmi
- Striped flufftail, Sarothrura affinis

== Rails, gallinules, and coots ==
Order: Gruiformes Family: Rallidae

Rallidae is a large family of small to medium-sized birds which includes the rails, crakes, coots, and gallinules. Typically they inhabit dense vegetation in damp environments near lakes, swamps, or rivers. In general they are shy and secretive birds, making them difficult to observe. Most species have strong legs and long toes which are well adapted to soft uneven surfaces. They tend to have short rounded wings and to be weak fliers.

- African rail, Rallus caerulescens
- Corn crake, Crex crex
- African crake, Crex egregia
- Spotted crake, Porzana porzana
- Lesser moorhen, Paragallinula angulata
- Eurasian moorhen, Gallinula chloropus
- Red-knobbed coot, Fulica cristata
- Allen's gallinule, Porphyrio alleni
- African swamphen, Porphyrio madagascariensis
- Striped crake, Amaurornis marginalis
- Black crake, Zapornia flavirostra
- Baillon's crake, Zapornia pusilla

== Finfoots ==
Order: Gruiformes Family: Heliornithidae

Heliornithidae is a small family of tropical birds with webbed lobes on their feet similar to those of grebes and coots.

- African finfoot, Podica senegalensis

== Cranes ==
Order: Gruiformes Family: Gruidae

Cranes are large, long-legged, and long-necked birds. Unlike the similar-looking but unrelated herons, cranes fly with necks outstretched, not pulled back. Most have elaborate and noisy courting displays or "dances".

- Gray crowned-crane, Balearica regulorum (endangered)
- Wattled crane, Bugeranus carunculatus (vulnerable)

== Thick-knees ==
Order: Charadriiformes Family: Burhinidae

The thick-knees are a group of largely tropical waders in the family Burhinidae. They are found worldwide within the tropical zone, with some species also breeding in temperate Europe and Australia. They are medium to large waders with strong black or yellow-black bills, large yellow eyes, and cryptic plumage. Despite being classed as waders, most species have a preference for arid or semi-arid habitats.

- Water thick-knee, Burhinus vermiculatus
- Eurasian thick-knee, Burhinus oedicnemus (A)
- Indian thick-knee, Burhinus indicus
- Spotted thick-knee, Burhinus capensis

== Stilts and avocets ==
Order: Charadriiformes Family: Recurvirostridae

Recurvirostridae is a family of large wading birds, which includes the avocets and stilts. The avocets have long legs and long up-curved bills. The stilts have extremely long legs and long, thin, straight bills.

- Black-winged stilt, Himantopus himantopus
- Pied avocet, Recurvirostra avosetta

== Oystercatchers ==
Order: Charadriiformes Family: Haematopodidae

The oystercatchers are large and noisy plover-like birds, with strong bills used for smashing or prising open molluscs.

- Eurasian oystercatcher, Haematopus ostralegus

== Plovers and lapwings ==
Order: Charadriiformes Family: Charadriidae

The family Charadriidae includes the plovers, dotterels, and lapwings. They are small to medium-sized birds with compact bodies, short thick necks, and long, usually pointed, wings. They are found in open country worldwide, mostly in habitats near water.

- Black-bellied plover, Pluvialis squatarola
- Pacific golden-plover, Pluvialis fulva
- Long-toed lapwing, Vanellus crassirostris
- Blacksmith lapwing, Vanellus armatus
- Spur-winged plover, Vanellus spinosus
- Black-headed lapwing, Vanellus tectus
- White-headed lapwing, Vanellus albiceps
- Senegal lapwing, Vanellus lugubris
- Black-winged lapwing, Vanellus melanopterus
- Crowned lapwing, Vanellus coronatus
- Wattled lapwing, Vanellus senegallus
- Brown-chested lapwing, Vanellus superciliosus
- Lesser sand-plover, Charadrius mongolus
- Greater sand-plover, Charadrius leschenaultii
- Caspian plover, Charadrius asiaticus
- Kittlitz's plover, Charadrius pecuarius
- Kentish plover, Charadrius alexandrinus (A)
- Common ringed plover, Charadrius hiaticula
- Little ringed plover, Charadrius dubius
- Three-banded plover, Charadrius tricollaris
- Forbes's plover, Charadrius forbesi
- White-fronted plover, Charadrius marginatus
- Chestnut-banded plover, Charadrius pallidus (near-threatened)

== Painted-snipes ==
Order: Charadriiformes Family: Rostratulidae

Painted-snipes are short-legged, long-billed birds similar in shape to the true snipes, but more brightly colored.

- Greater painted-snipe, Rostratula benghalensis

== Jacanas ==
Order: Charadriiformes Family: Jacanidae

The jacanas are a family of waders found throughout the tropics. They are identifiable by their huge feet and claws which enable them to walk on floating vegetation in the shallow lakes that are their preferred habitat.

- Lesser jacana, Microparra capensis
- African jacana, Actophilornis africanus

== Sandpipers and allies ==
Order: Charadriiformes Family: Scolopacidae

Scolopacidae is a large diverse family of small to medium-sized shorebirds including the sandpipers, curlews, godwits, shanks, tattlers, woodcocks, snipes, dowitchers, and phalaropes. The majority of these species eat small invertebrates picked out of the mud or soil. Variation in length of legs and bills enables multiple species to feed in the same habitat, particularly on the coast, without direct competition for food.

- Whimbrel, Numenius phaeopus
- Eurasian curlew, Numenius arquata (near-threatened)
- Bar-tailed godwit, Limosa lapponica (near-threatened)
- Black-tailed godwit, Limosa limosa (near-threatened)
- Ruddy turnstone, Arenaria interpres
- Red knot, Calidris canutus (near-threatened)
- Ruff, Calidris pugnax
- Broad-billed sandpiper, Calidris falcinellus
- Curlew sandpiper, Calidris ferruginea (near-threatened)
- Temminck's stint, Calidris temminckii (A)
- Long-toed stint, Calidris subminuta (A)
- Sanderling, Calidris alba
- Little stint, Calidris minuta
- Pectoral sandpiper, Calidris melanotos (A)
- Jack snipe, Lymnocryptes minimus
- Great snipe, Gallinago media (near-threatened)
- Common snipe, Gallinago gallinago
- African snipe, Gallinago nigripennis
- Terek sandpiper, Xenus cinereus
- Red-necked phalarope, Phalaropus lobatus
- Red phalarope, Phalaropus fulicarius (A)
- Common sandpiper, Actitis hypoleucos
- Green sandpiper, Tringa ochropus
- Spotted redshank, Tringa erythropus
- Common greenshank, Tringa nebularia
- Marsh sandpiper, Tringa stagnatilis
- Wood sandpiper, Tringa glareola
- Common redshank, Tringa totanus

== Buttonquails ==
Order: Charadriiformes Family: Turnicidae

The buttonquails are small, drab, running birds which resemble the true quails. The female is the brighter of the sexes and initiates courtship. The male incubates the eggs and tends the young.

- Small buttonquail, Turnix sylvaticus
- Black-rumped buttonquail, Turnix nanus
- Quail-plover, Ortyxelos meiffrenii (A)

== Crab-plover ==
Order: Charadriiformes Family: Dromadidae

The crab-plover is related to the waders. It resembles a plover but has very long grey legs and a strong heavy black bill similar to that of a tern. It has black-and-white plumage, a long neck, partially webbed feet, and a bill designed for eating crabs.

- Crab-plover, Dromas ardeola

== Pratincoles and coursers ==
Order: Charadriiformes Family: Glareolidae

Glareolidae is a family of wading birds comprising the pratincoles, which have short legs, long pointed wings, and long forked tails, and the coursers, which have long legs, short wings, and long, pointed bills which curve downwards.

- Temminck's courser, Cursorius temminckii
- Double-banded courser, Smutsornis africanus
- Three-banded courser, Rhinoptilus cinctus
- Bronze-winged courser, Rhinoptilus chalcopterus
- Collared pratincole, Glareola pratincola
- Black-winged pratincole, Glareola nordmanni (A) (near-threatened)
- Madagascar pratincole, Glareola ocularis (vulnerable)
- Rock pratincole, Glareola nuchalis

== Skuas and jaegers ==
Order: Charadriiformes Family: Stercorariidae

The family Stercorariidae are, in general, medium to large birds, typically with gray or brown plumage, often with white markings on the wings. They nest on the ground in temperate and arctic regions and are long-distance migrants.

- Pomarine jaeger, Stercorarius pomarinus (A)
- Parasitic jaeger, Stercorarius parasiticus
- Long-tailed jaeger, Stercorarius longicaudus (A)

== Gulls, terns, and skimmers ==
Order: Charadriiformes Family: Laridae

Laridae is a family of medium to large seabirds which include the gulls, kittiwakes, terns, and skimmers. Gulls are typically gray or white, often with black markings on the head or wings. They have stout, longish bills and webbed feet. Terns are a group of generally medium to large seabirds typically with gray or white plumage, often with black markings on the head. Most terns hunt fish by diving but some pick insects off the surface of fresh water. Terns are generally long-lived birds, with several species known to live in excess of 30 years. Skimmers are a small family of tropical tern-like birds. They have an elongated lower mandible which they use to feed by flying low over the water surface and skimming the water for small fish.

- Slender-billed gull, Chroicocephalus genei (A)
- Gray-hooded gull, Chroicocephalus cirrocephalus
- Black-headed gull, Chroicocephalus ridibundus
- Franklin's gull, Leucophaeus pipixcan (A)
- Sooty gull, Ichthyaetus hemprichii
- Herring gull, Larus argentatus
- Lesser black-backed gull, Larus fuscus
- Kelp gull, Larus dominicanus (A)
- Brown noddy, Anous stolidus
- Lesser noddy, Anous tenuirostris
- Sooty tern, Onychoprion fuscatus
- Bridled tern, Onychoprion anaethetus
- Little tern, Sternula albifrons (A)
- Saunders's tern, Sternula saundersi
- Gull-billed tern, Gelochelidon nilotica
- Caspian tern, Hydroprogne caspia
- White-winged tern, Chlidonias leucopterus
- Whiskered tern, Chlidonias hybrida
- Roseate tern, Sterna dougallii
- Black-naped tern, Sterna sumatrana (A)
- Common tern, Sterna hirundo
- White-cheeked tern, Sterna repressa
- Great crested tern, Thalasseus bergii
- Sandwich tern, Thalasseus sandvicensis
- Lesser crested tern, Thalasseus bengalensis
- African skimmer, Rynchops flavirostris (near-threatened)

== Tropicbirds ==
Order: Phaethontiformes Family: Phaethontidae

Tropicbirds are slender white birds of tropical oceans, with exceptionally long central tail feathers. Their heads and long wings have black markings.

- White-tailed tropicbird, Phaethon lepturus
- Red-billed tropicbird, Phaethon aethereus (A)

== Albatrosses ==
Order: Procellariiformes Family: Diomedeidae

The albatrosses are among the largest of flying birds, and the great albatrosses from the genus Diomedea have the largest wingspans of any extant birds.

- White-capped albatross, Thalassarche cauta (A)

== Southern storm-petrels ==
Order: Procellariiformes Family: Oceanitidae

The storm-petrels are the smallest seabirds, relatives of the petrels, feeding on planktonic crustaceans and small fish picked from the surface, typically while hovering. The flight is fluttering and sometimes bat-like. Until 2018, this family's species were included with the other storm-petrels in family Hydrobatidae.

- White-bellied storm-petrel, Fregetta grallaria (A)

== Shearwaters and petrels ==
Order: Procellariiformes Family: Procellariidae

The procellariids are the main group of medium-sized "true petrels", characterised by united nostrils with medium septum and a long outer functional primary.

- Southern giant-petrel, Macronectes giganteus (A)
- White-chinned petrel, Procellaria aequinoctialis (A)
- Wedge-tailed shearwater, Ardenna pacifica (A)
- Tropical shearwater, Puffinus bailloni (A)

== Storks ==
Order: Ciconiiformes Family: Ciconiidae

Storks are large, long-legged, long-necked wading birds with long, stout bills. Storks are mute, but bill-clattering is an important mode of communication at the nest. Their nests can be large and may be reused for many years. Many species are migratory.

- African openbill, Anastomus lamelligerus
- Black stork, Ciconia nigra
- Abdim's stork, Ciconia abdimii
- African woolly-necked stork, Ciconia microscelis
- White stork, Ciconia ciconia
- Saddle-billed stork, Ephippiorhynchus senegalensis
- Marabou stork, Leptoptilos crumenifer
- Yellow-billed stork, Mycteria ibis

== Frigatebirds ==
Order: Suliformes Family: Fregatidae

Frigatebirds are large seabirds usually found over tropical oceans. They are large, black-and-white, or completely black, with long wings and deeply forked tails. The males have colored inflatable throat pouches. They do not swim or walk and cannot take off from a flat surface. Having the largest wingspan-to-body-weight ratio of any bird, they are essentially aerial, able to stay aloft for more than a week.

- Lesser frigatebird, Fregata ariel
- Great frigatebird, Fregata minor

== Boobies and gannets ==
Order: Suliformes Family: Sulidae

The sulids comprise the gannets and boobies. Both groups are medium to large coastal seabirds that plunge-dive for fish.

- Masked booby, Sula dactylatra
- Brown booby, Sula leucogaster (A)
- Red-footed booby, Sula sula (A)
- Cape gannet, Morus capensis (endangered)

== Anhingas ==
Order: Suliformes Family: Anhingidae

Anhingas or darters are often called "snake-birds" because of their long thin neck, which gives a snake-like appearance when they swim with their bodies submerged. The males have black and dark-brown plumage, an erectile crest on the nape, and a larger bill than the female. The females have much paler plumage especially on the neck and underparts. The darters have completely webbed feet and their legs are short and set far back on the body. Their plumage is somewhat permeable, like that of cormorants, and they spread their wings to dry after diving.

- African darter, Anhinga melanogaster

== Cormorants and shags ==
Order: Suliformes Family: Phalacrocoracidae

Phalacrocoracidae is a family of medium to large coastal, fish-eating seabirds that includes cormorants and shags. Plumage coloration varies, with the majority having mainly dark plumage, some species being black-and-white, and a few being colorful.

- Long-tailed cormorant, Microcarbo africanus
- Great cormorant, Phalacrocorax carbo

== Pelicans ==
Order: Pelecaniformes Family: Pelecanidae

Pelicans are large water birds with a distinctive pouch under their beak. As with other members of the order Pelecaniformes, they have webbed feet with four toes.

- Great white pelican, Pelecanus onocrotalus
- Pink-backed pelican, Pelecanus rufescens

== Shoebill ==
Order: Pelecaniformes Family: Balaenicipididae

The shoebill is a large bird related to the storks. It derives its name from its massive shoe-shaped bill.

- Shoebill, Balaeniceps rex (vulnerable)

== Hamerkop ==
Order: Pelecaniformes Family: Scopidae

The hamerkop is a medium-sized bird with a long shaggy crest. The shape of its head with a curved bill and crest at the back is reminiscent of a hammer, hence its name. Its plumage is drab-brown all over.

- Hamerkop, Scopus umbretta

== Herons, egrets, and bitterns ==
Order: Pelecaniformes Family: Ardeidae

The family Ardeidae contains the bitterns, herons, and egrets. Herons and egrets are medium to large wading birds with long necks and legs. Bitterns tend to be shorter-necked and more wary. Members of Ardeidae fly with their necks retracted, unlike other long-necked birds such as storks, ibises, and spoonbills.

- Great bittern, Botaurus stellaris
- Little bittern, Ixobrychus minutus
- Dwarf bittern, Ixobrychus sturmii
- Gray heron, Ardea cinerea
- Black-headed heron, Ardea melanocephala
- Goliath heron, Ardea goliath
- Purple heron, Ardea purpurea
- Great egret, Ardea alba
- Intermediate egret, Ardea intermedia
- Little egret, Egretta garzetta
- Western reef-heron, Egretta gularis
- Black heron, Egretta ardesiaca
- Cattle egret, Bubulcus ibis
- Squacco heron, Ardeola ralloides
- Malagasy pond-heron, Ardeola idae (endangered)
- Rufous-bellied heron, Ardeola rufiventris
- Striated heron, Butorides striata
- Black-crowned night-heron, Nycticorax nycticorax
- White-backed night-heron, Gorsachius leuconotus

== Ibises and spoonbills ==
Order: Pelecaniformes Family: Threskiornithidae

Threskiornithidae is a family of large terrestrial and wading birds which includes the ibises and spoonbills. They have long, broad wings with 11 primary and about 20 secondary feathers. They are strong fliers and despite their size and weight, very capable soarers.

- Glossy ibis, Plegadis falcinellus
- African sacred ibis, Threskiornis aethiopicus
- Olive ibis, Bostrychia olivacea
- Spot-breasted ibis, Bostrychia rara
- Hadada ibis, Bostrychia hagedash
- African spoonbill, Platalea alba

== Secretarybird ==
Order: Accipitriformes Family: Sagittariidae

The secretarybird is a bird of prey but is easily distinguished from other raptors by its long crane-like legs.

- Secretarybird, Sagittarius serpentarius (vulnerable)

== Osprey ==
Order: Accipitriformes Family: Pandionidae

The family Pandionidae contains only one species, the osprey. The osprey is a medium-large raptor which is a specialist fish-eater with a worldwide distribution.

- Osprey, Pandion haliaetus

== Hawks, eagles, and kites ==
Order: Accipitriformes Family: Accipitridae

Accipitridae is a family of birds of prey which includes hawks, eagles, kites, harriers, and Old World vultures. These birds have powerful hooked beaks for tearing flesh from their prey, strong legs, powerful talons, and keen eyesight.

- Black-winged kite, Elanus caeruleus
- Scissor-tailed kite, Chelictinia riocourii
- African harrier-hawk, Polyboroides typus
- Palm-nut vulture, Gypohierax angolensis
- Bearded vulture, Gypaetus barbatus (near-threatened)
- Egyptian vulture, Neophron percnopterus (endangered)
- European honey-buzzard, Pernis apivorus
- Oriental honey-buzzard, Pernis ptilorhynchus (A)
- African cuckoo-hawk, Aviceda cuculoides
- White-headed vulture, Trigonoceps occipitalis (critically endangered)
- Lappet-faced vulture, Torgos tracheliotos (endangered)
- Hooded vulture, Necrosyrtes monachus (critically endangered)
- White-backed vulture, Gyps africanus (critically endangered)
- Rüppell's griffon, Gyps rueppelli (critically endangered)
- Bateleur, Terathopius ecaudatus (near-threatened)
- Short-toed snake-eagle, Circaetus gallicus (A)
- Beaudouin's snake-eagle, Circaetus beaudouini
- Black-chested snake-eagle, Circaetus pectoralis
- Brown snake-eagle, Circaetus cinereus
- Fasciated snake-eagle, Circaetus fasciolatus (near-threatened)
- Banded snake-eagle, Circaetus cinerascens
- Bat hawk, Macheiramphus alcinus
- Crowned eagle, Stephanoaetus coronatus (near-threatened)
- Martial eagle, Polemaetus bellicosus (vulnerable)
- Long-crested eagle, Lophaetus occipitalis
- Lesser spotted eagle, Clanga pomarina
- Greater spotted eagle, Clanga clanga (A)(vulnerable)
- Wahlberg's eagle, Hieraaetus wahlbergi
- Booted eagle, Hieraaetus pennatus
- Ayres's hawk-eagle, Hieraaetus ayresii
- Tawny eagle, Aquila rapax (vulnerable)
- Steppe eagle, Aquila nipalensis (endangered)
- Imperial eagle, Aquila heliaca (vulnerable)
- Cassin's hawk-eagle, Aquila africana (A)
- Verreaux's eagle, Aquila verreauxii
- African hawk-eagle, Aquila spilogaster
- Lizard buzzard, Kaupifalco monogrammicus
- Dark chanting-goshawk, Melierax metabates
- Eastern chanting-goshawk, Melierax poliopterus
- Gabar goshawk, Micronisus gabar
- Grasshopper buzzard, Butastur rufipennis
- Eurasian marsh-harrier, Circus aeruginosus
- African marsh-harrier, Circus ranivorus
- Malagasy harrier, Circus macrosceles (A)
- Pallid harrier, Circus macrourus (near-threatened)
- Montagu's harrier, Circus pygargus
- African goshawk, Accipiter tachiro
- Shikra, Accipiter badius
- Levant sparrowhawk, Accipiter brevipes (A)
- Little sparrowhawk, Accipiter minullus
- Ovambo sparrowhawk, Accipiter ovampensis
- Eurasian sparrowhawk, Accipiter nisus (A)
- Rufous-breasted sparrowhawk, Accipiter rufiventris
- Black goshawk, Accipiter melanoleucus
- Black kite, Milvus migrans
- African fish-eagle, Haliaeetus vocifer
- Common buzzard, Buteo buteo
- Mountain buzzard, Buteo oreophilus (near-threatened)
- Long-legged buzzard, Buteo rufinus (A)
- Augur buzzard, Buteo augur

== Barn-owls ==
Order: Strigiformes Family: Tytonidae

Barn-owls are medium to large owls with large heads and characteristic heart-shaped faces. They have long strong legs with powerful talons.

- African grass-owl, Tyto capensis
- Western barn owl, Tyto alba
- Congo bay-owl, Phodilus prigoginei (endangered)

== True owls ==
Order: Strigiformes Family: Strigidae

The typical owls are small to large solitary nocturnal birds of prey. They have large forward-facing eyes and ears, a hawk-like beak, and a conspicuous circle of feathers around each eye called a facial disk.

- Sokoke scops-owl, Otus ireneae (endangered)
- Eurasian scops-owl, Otus scops
- Pemba scops-owl, Otus pembaensis (E) (vulnerable)
- African scops-owl, Otus senegalensis
- Southern white-faced owl, Ptilopsis granti
- Cape eagle-owl, Bubo capensis
- Spotted eagle-owl, Bubo africanus
- Fraser's eagle-owl, Bubo poensis
- Verreaux's eagle-owl, Bubo lacteus
- Pel's fishing-owl, Scotopelia peli
- Pearl-spotted owlet, Glaucidium perlatum
- African barred owlet, Glaucidium capense
- African wood-owl, Strix woodfordii
- Short-eared owl, Asio flammeus (A)
- Marsh owl, Asio capensis

== Mousebirds ==
Order: Coliiformes Family: Coliidae

The mousebirds are slender grayish or brown birds with soft, hairlike body feathers and very long thin tails. They are arboreal and scurry through the leaves like rodents in search of berries, fruit, and buds. They are acrobatic and can feed upside down. All species have strong claws and reversible outer toes. They also have crests and stubby bills.

- Speckled mousebird, Colius striatus
- White-headed mousebird, Colius leucocephalus
- Blue-naped mousebird, Urocolius macrourus
- Red-faced mousebird, Urocolius indicus

== Trogons ==
Order: Trogoniformes Family: Trogonidae

The family Trogonidae includes trogons and quetzals. Found in tropical woodlands worldwide, they feed on insects and fruit, and their broad bills and weak legs reflect their diet and arboreal habits. Although their flight is fast, they are reluctant to fly any distance. Trogons have soft, often colorful, feathers with distinctive male and female plumage.

- Narina trogon, Apaloderma narina
- Bar-tailed trogon, Apaloderma vittatum

== Hoopoes ==
Order: Bucerotiformes Family: Upupidae

Hoopoes have black, white, and orangey-pink coloring with a large erectile crest on their head.

- Eurasian hoopoe, Upupa epops

== Woodhoopoes and scimitarbills ==
Order: Bucerotiformes Family: Phoeniculidae

The woodhoopoes and scimitarbills are related to the hoopoes, ground-hornbills, and hornbills. They most resemble the hoopoes with their long curved bills, used to probe for insects, and short rounded wings. However, they differ in that they have metallic plumage, often blue, green, or purple, and lack an erectile crest.

- Green woodhoopoe, Phoeniculus purpureus
- Violet woodhoopoe, Phoeniculus damarensis
- White-headed woodhoopoe, Phoeniculus bollei
- Forest woodhoopoe, Phoeniculus castaneiceps
- Common scimitarbill, Rhinopomastus cyanomelas
- Abyssinian scimitarbill, Rhinopomastus minor

== Ground-hornbills ==
Order: Bucerotiformes Family: Bucorvidae

The ground-hornbills are terrestrial birds which feed almost entirely on insects, other birds, snakes, and amphibians.

- Southern ground-hornbill, Bucorvus leadbeateri (vulnerable)

== Hornbills ==
Order: Bucerotiformes Family: Bucerotidae

Hornbills are a group of birds whose bill is shaped like a cow's horn, but without a twist, sometimes with a casque on the upper mandible. Frequently, the bill is brightly colored.

- Crowned hornbill, Lophoceros alboterminatus
- African pied hornbill, Lophoceros fasciatus
- African gray hornbill, Lophoceros nasutus
- Pale-billed hornbill, Lophoceros pallidirostris
- Eastern yellow-billed hornbill, Tockus flavirostris
- Von der Decken's hornbill, Tockus deckeni
- Tanzanian red-billed hornbill, Tockus ruahae (E)
- Northern red-billed hornbill, Tockus erythrorhynchus
- Silvery-cheeked hornbill, Bycanistes brevis
- Black-and-white-casqued hornbill, Bycanistes subcylindricus
- Trumpeter hornbill, Bycanistes bucinator

== Kingfishers ==
Order: Coraciiformes Family: Alcedinidae

Kingfishers are medium-sized birds with large heads, long, pointed bills, short legs, and stubby tails.

- Half-collared kingfisher, Alcedo semitorquata
- Shining-blue kingfisher, Alcedo quadribrachys (A)
- Malachite kingfisher, Corythornis cristatus
- White-bellied kingfisher, Corythornis leucogaster
- African pygmy kingfisher, Ispidina picta
- Gray-headed kingfisher, Halcyon leucocephala
- Woodland kingfisher, Halcyon senegalensis
- Mangrove kingfisher, Halcyon senegaloides
- Blue-breasted kingfisher, Halcyon malimbica
- Brown-hooded kingfisher, Halcyon albiventris
- Striped kingfisher, Halcyon chelicuti
- Giant kingfisher, Megaceryle maximus
- Pied kingfisher, Ceryle rudis

== Bee-eaters ==
Order: Coraciiformes Family: Meropidae

The bee-eaters are a group of near passerine birds in the family Meropidae. Most species are found in Africa but others occur in southern Europe, Madagascar, Australia, and New Guinea. They are characterised by richly colored plumage, slender bodies, and usually elongated central tail feathers. All are colorful and have long downturned bills and pointed wings, which give them a swallow-like appearance when seen from afar.

- Red-throated bee-eater, Merops bulocki (A)
- White-fronted bee-eater, Merops bullockoides
- Little bee-eater, Merops pusillus
- Blue-breasted bee-eater, Merops variegatus
- Cinnamon-chested bee-eater, Merops oreobates
- Swallow-tailed bee-eater, Merops hirundineus
- Somali bee-eater, Merops revoilii
- White-throated bee-eater, Merops albicollis
- Böhm's bee-eater, Merops boehmi
- Blue-cheeked bee-eater, Merops persicus
- Madagascar bee-eater, Merops superciliosus
- European bee-eater, Merops apiaster
- Northern carmine bee-eater, Merops nubicus
- Southern carmine bee-eater, Merops nubicoides

== Rollers ==
Order: Coraciiformes Family: Coraciidae

Rollers resemble crows in size and build, but are more closely related to the kingfishers and bee-eaters. They share the colorful appearance of those groups with blues and browns predominating. The two inner front toes are connected, but the outer toe is not.

- European roller, Coracias garrulus
- Lilac-breasted roller, Coracias caudatus
- Racket-tailed roller, Coracias spatulatus
- Rufous-crowned roller, Coracias naevius
- Broad-billed roller, Eurystomus glaucurus

== African barbets ==
Order: Piciformes Family: Lybiidae

The African barbets are plump birds with short necks and large heads. They get their name from the bristles which fringe their heavy bills. Most species are brightly colored.

- Crested barbet, Trachyphonus vaillantii
- Red-and-yellow barbet, Trachyphonus erythrocephalus
- D'Arnaud's barbet, Trachyphonus darnaudii
- Gray-throated barbet, Gymnobucco bonapartei
- White-eared barbet, Stactolaema leucotis
- Whyte's barbet, Stactolaema whytii
- Green barbet, Stactolaema olivacea
- Green tinkerbird, Pogoniulus simplex
- Moustached tinkerbird, Pogoniulus leucomystax
- Yellow-rumped tinkerbird, Pogoniulus bilineatus
- Red-fronted tinkerbird, Pogoniulus pusillus
- Yellow-fronted tinkerbird, Pogoniulus chrysoconus
- Yellow-spotted barbet, Buccanodon duchaillui
- Hairy-breasted barbet, Tricholaema hirsuta
- Red-fronted barbet, Tricholaema diademata
- Miombo barbet, Tricholaema frontata
- Spot-flanked barbet, Tricholaema lachrymosa
- Black-throated barbet, Tricholaema melanocephala
- White-headed barbet, Lybius leucocephalus
- Red-faced barbet, Lybius rubrifacies (near-threatened)
- Black-billed barbet, Lybius guifsobalito
- Black-collared barbet, Lybius torquatus
- Brown-breasted barbet, Lybius melanopterus
- Black-backed barbet, Lybius minor
- Double-toothed barbet, Lybius bidentatus

== Honeyguides ==
Order: Piciformes Family: Indicatoridae

Honeyguides are among the few birds that feed on wax. They are named for the greater honeyguide which leads traditional honey-hunters to bees' nests and, after the hunters have harvested the honey, feeds on the remaining contents of the hive.

- Green-backed honeyguide, Prodotiscus zambesiae
- Wahlberg's honeyguide, Prodotiscus regulus
- Pallid honeyguide, Indicator meliphilus
- Least honeyguide, Indicator exilis
- Lesser honeyguide, Indicator minor
- Scaly-throated honeyguide, Indicator variegatus
- Greater honeyguide, Indicator indicator

== Woodpeckers ==
Order: Piciformes Family: Picidae

Woodpeckers are small to medium-sized birds with chisel-like beaks, short legs, stiff tails, and long tongues used for capturing insects. Some species have feet with two toes pointing forward and two backward, while several species have only three toes. Many woodpeckers have the habit of tapping noisily on tree trunks with their beaks.

- Eurasian wryneck, Jynx torquilla (A)
- Rufous-necked wryneck, Jynx ruficollis
- Speckle-breasted woodpecker, Chloropicus poecilolaemus (A)
- Cardinal woodpecker, Chloropicus fuscescens
- Bearded woodpecker, Chloropicus namaquus
- Golden-crowned woodpecker, Chloropicus xantholophus (A)
- Stierling's woodpecker, Chloropicus stierlingi (near-threatened)
- Brown-backed woodpecker, Chloropicus obsoletus
- African gray woodpecker, Chloropicus goertae
- Mountain gray woodpecker, Chloropicus spodocephalus
- Olive woodpecker, Chloropicus griseocephalus
- Brown-eared woodpecker, Campethera caroli
- Buff-spotted woodpecker, Campethera nivosa
- Tullberg's woodpecker, Campethera tullbergi
- Green-backed woodpecker, Campethera cailliautii
- Nubian woodpecker, Campethera nubica
- Bennett's woodpecker, Campethera bennettii
- Reichenow's woodpecker, Campethera scriptoricauda
- Golden-tailed woodpecker, Campethera abingoni
- Mombasa woodpecker, Campethera mombassica

== Falcons and caracaras ==
Order: Falconiformes Family: Falconidae

Falconidae is a family of diurnal birds of prey. They differ from hawks, eagles, and kites in that they kill with their beaks instead of their talons.

- Pygmy falcon, Polihierax semitorquatus
- Lesser kestrel, Falco naumanni
- Eurasian kestrel, Falco tinnunculus
- Rock kestrel, Falco rupicolus
- Greater kestrel, Falco rupicoloides
- Fox kestrel, Falco alopex
- Gray kestrel, Falco ardosiaceus
- Dickinson's kestrel, Falco dickinsoni
- Red-necked falcon, Falco chicquera
- Red-footed falcon, Falco vespertinus (near-threatened)
- Amur falcon, Falco amurensis
- Eleonora's falcon, Falco eleonorae
- Sooty falcon, Falco concolor (vulnerable)
- Eurasian hobby, Falco subbuteo
- African hobby, Falco cuvierii
- Lanner falcon, Falco biarmicus
- Saker falcon, Falco cherrug (A) (endangered)
- Peregrine falcon, Falco peregrinus
- Taita falcon, Falco fasciinucha (vulnerable)

== Old World parrots ==
Order: Psittaciformes Family: Psittaculidae

Characteristic features of parrots include a strong curved bill, an upright stance, strong legs, and clawed zygodactyl feet. Many parrots are vividly colored, and some are multi-colored. In size they range from 8 cm (3.1 in) to 1 m (3.3 ft) in length. Old World parrots are found from Africa east across south and southeast Asia and Oceania to Australia and New Zealand.

- Red-headed lovebird, Agapornis pullarius
- Fischer's lovebird, Agapornis fischeri (near-threatened)
- Yellow-collared lovebird, Agapornis personatus (E)
- Lilian's lovebird, Agapornis lilianae (near-threatened)

== African and New World parrots ==
Order: Psittaciformes Family: Psittacidae

Characteristic features of parrots include a strong curved bill, an upright stance, strong legs, and clawed zygodactyl feet. Many parrots are vividly colored, and some are multi-colored. In size they range from 8 cm (3.1 in) to 1 m (3.3 ft) in length. Most of the more than 150 species in this family are found in the New World.

- Gray parrot, Psittacus erithacus
- Brown-necked parrot, Poicephalus fuscicollis
- Red-fronted parrot, Poicephalus gulielmi
- Meyer's parrot, Poicephalus meyeri
- Brown-headed parrot, Poicephalus cryptoxanthus
- Red-bellied parrot, Poicephalus rufiventris

== African broadbills ==
Order: Passeriformes Family: Eurylaimidae

The broadbills are small, brightly colored birds which feed on fruit and also take insects in flycatcher fashion, snapping their broad bills. Their habitat is canopies of wet forests.

- African broadbill, Smithornis capensis

== Pittas ==
Order: Passeriformes Family: Pittidae

Pittas are medium-sized by passerine standards and are stocky, with fairly long, strong legs, short tails, and stout bills. Many are brightly colored. They spend the majority of their time on wet forest floors, eating snails, insects and similar invertebrates.

- African pitta, Pitta angolensis

== Cuckooshrikes ==
Order: Passeriformes Family: Campephagidae

The cuckooshrikes are small to medium-sized passerine birds. They are predominantly grayish with white and black, although some species are brightly colored.

- Gray cuckooshrike, Coracina caesia
- White-breasted cuckooshrike, Coracina pectoralis
- Black cuckooshrike, Campephaga flava
- Purple-throated cuckooshrike, Campephaga quiscalina

== Old World orioles ==
Order: Passeriformes Family: Oriolidae

The Old World orioles are colorful passerine birds. They are not related to the similar-appearing New World orioles.

- Eurasian golden oriole, Oriolus oriolus
- African golden oriole, Oriolus auratus
- Green-headed oriole, Oriolus chlorocephalus
- Western black-headed oriole, Oriolus brachyrynchus (A)
- African black-headed oriole, Oriolus larvatus
- Black-tailed oriole, Oriolus percivali

== Wattle-eyes and batises ==
Order: Passeriformes Family: Platysteiridae

The wattle-eyes, or puffback flycatchers, are small stout passerine birds of the African tropics. They get their name from the brightly colored fleshy eye decorations found in most species in this group.

- Brown-throated wattle-eye, Platysteira cyanea
- Black-throated wattle-eye, Platysteira peltata
- Chestnut wattle-eye, Platysteira castanea
- Jameson's wattle-eye, Platysteira jamesoni
- Yellow-bellied wattle-eye, Platysteira concreta
- Short-tailed batis, Batis mixta
- Dark batis, Batis crypta
- Rwenzori batis, Batis diops
- Cape batis, Batis capensis
- Chinspot batis, Batis molitor
- Pale batis, Batis soror
- Western black-headed batis, Batis erlangeri
- Eastern black-headed batis, Batis minor
- Pygmy batis, Batis perkeo

== Vangas, helmetshrikes, and allies ==
Order: Passeriformes Family: Vangidae

The helmetshrikes are similar in build to the shrikes, but tend to be colorful species with distinctive crests or other head ornaments, such as wattles, from which they get their name.

- White helmetshrike, Prionops plumatus
- Gray-crested helmetshrike, Prionops poliolophus (near-threatened)
- Retz's helmetshrike, Prionops retzii
- Chestnut-fronted helmetshrike, Prionops scopifrons
- African shrike-flycatcher, Megabyas flammulatus
- Black-and-white shrike-flycatcher, Bias musicus

== Bushshrikes and allies ==
Order: Passeriformes Family: Malaconotidae

Bushshrikes are similar in habits to shrikes, hunting insects and other small prey from a perch on a bush. Although similar in build to the shrikes, these tend to be either colorful species or largely black; some species are quite secretive.

- Brubru, Nilaus afer
- Northern puffback, Dryoscopus gambensis
- Pringle's puffback, Dryoscopus pringlii
- Black-backed puffback, Dryoscopus cubla
- Pink-footed puffback, Dryoscopus angolensis
- Marsh tchagra, Tchagra minuta
- Black-crowned tchagra, Tchagra senegala
- Brown-crowned tchagra, Tchagra australis
- Three-streaked tchagra, Tchagra jamesi
- Lühder's bushshrike, Laniarius luehderi
- Tropical boubou, Laniarius major
- Zanzibar boubou, Laniarius sublacteus
- Black-headed gonolek, Laniarius erythrogaster
- Papyrus gonolek, Laniarius mufumbiri (A) (near-threatened)
- Slate-colored boubou, Laniarius funebris
- Fülleborn's boubou, Laniarius fuelleborni
- Rosy-patched bushshrike, Rhodophoneus cruentus
- Sulphur-breasted bushshrike, Telophorus sulfureopectus
- Black-fronted bushshrike, Telophorus nigrifrons
- Four-colored bushshrike, Telophorus viridis
- Gray-headed bushshrike, Malaconotus blanchoti
- Uluguru bushshrike, Malaconotus alius (E) (endangered)

== Drongos ==
Order: Passeriformes Family: Dicruridae

The drongos are mostly black or dark gray in color, sometimes with metallic tints. They have long forked tails, and some Asian species have elaborate tail decorations. They have short legs and sit very upright when perched, like a shrike. They flycatch or take prey from the ground.

- Common square-tailed drongo, Dicrurus ludwigii
- Fork-tailed drongo, Dicrurus adsimilis

== Monarch flycatchers ==
Order: Passeriformes Family: Monarchidae

The monarch flycatchers are small to medium-sized insectivorous passerines which hunt by flycatching.

- African crested-flycatcher, Trochocercus cyanomelas
- Black-headed paradise-flycatcher, Terpsiphone rufiventer
- African paradise-flycatcher, Terpsiphone viridis

== Shrikes ==
Order: Passeriformes Family: Laniidae

Shrikes are passerine birds known for their habit of catching other birds and small animals and impaling the uneaten portions of their bodies on thorns. A typical shrike's beak is hooked, like that of a raptor.

- Red-backed shrike, Lanius collurio
- Red-tailed shrike, Lanius phoenicuroides
- Isabelline shrike, Lanius isabellinus (A)
- Lesser gray shrike, Lanius minor
- Gray-backed fiscal, Lanius excubitoroides
- Long-tailed fiscal, Lanius cabanisi
- Magpie shrike, Lanius melanoleucus
- Taita fiscal, Lanius dorsalis
- Mackinnon's shrike, Lanius mackinnoni
- Northern fiscal, Lanius humeralis
- Southern fiscal, Lanius collaris
- Souza's shrike, Lanius souzae
- Masked shrike, Lanius nubicus (A)
- Woodchat shrike, Lanius senator
- White-rumped shrike, Eurocephalus ruppelli

== Crows, jays, and magpies ==
Order: Passeriformes Family: Corvidae

The family Corvidae includes crows, ravens, jays, choughs, magpies, treepies, nutcrackers, and ground jays. Corvids are above average in size among the Passeriformes, and some of the larger species show high levels of intelligence.

- Piapiac, Ptilostomus afer (A)
- House crow, Corvus splendens (I)
- Cape crow, Corvus capensis
- Pied crow, Corvus albus
- Somali crow, Corvus edithae
- White-necked raven, Corvus albicollis

== Hyliotas ==
Order: Passeriformes Family: Hyliotidae

The members of this small family, all of genus Hyliota, are birds of the forest canopy. They tend to feed in mixed-species flocks.

- Yellow-bellied hyliota, Hyliota flavigaster
- Usambara hyliota, Hyliota usambara (E)(endangered)

== Fairy flycatchers ==
Order: Passeriformes Family: Stenostiridae

Most of the species of this small family are found in Africa, though a few inhabit tropical Asia. They are not closely related to other birds called "flycatchers".

- African blue flycatcher, Elminia longicauda
- White-tailed blue flycatcher, Elminia albicauda
- Dusky crested-flycatcher, Elminia nigromitrata
- White-tailed crested-flycatcher, Elminia albonotata

== Tits, chickadees, and titmice ==
Order: Passeriformes Family: Paridae

The Paridae are mainly small stocky woodland species with short stout bills. Some have crests. They are adaptable birds, with a mixed diet including seeds and insects.

- White-shouldered black-tit, Melaniparus guineensis
- White-winged black-tit, Melaniparus leucomelas
- Rufous-bellied tit, Melaniparus rufiventris
- White-bellied tit, Melaniparus albiventris
- Southern black-tit, Melaniparus niger
- Miombo tit, Melaniparus griseiventris
- Somali tit, Melaniparus thruppi
- Red-throated tit, Melaniparus fringillinus

== Penduline-tits ==
Order: Passeriformes Family: Remizidae

The penduline tits are a group of small passerine birds related to the true tits. They are insectivores.

- Mouse-colored penduline-tit, Anthoscopus musculus
- African penduline-tit, Anthoscopus caroli

== Larks ==
Order: Passeriformes Family: Alaudidae

Larks are small terrestrial birds with often extravagant songs and display flights. Most larks are fairly dull in appearance. Their food is insects and seeds.

- Spike-heeled lark, Chersomanes albofasciata
- Dusky lark, Pinarocorys nigricans
- Chestnut-backed sparrow-lark, Eremopterix leucotis
- Fischer's sparrow-lark, Eremopterix leucopareia
- Pink-breasted lark, Calendulauda poecilosterna
- Fawn-colored lark, Calendulauda africanoides
- Red-winged lark, Mirafra hypermetra
- Rufous-naped lark, Mirafra africana
- Angola lark, Mirafra angolensis
- Flappet lark, Mirafra rufocinnamomea
- Friedmann's lark, Mirafra pulpa (population data deficient)
- White-tailed lark, Mirafra albicauda
- Latakoo lark, Mirafra cheniana (A)
- Horsfield's bushlark, Mirafra javanica
- Red-capped lark, Calandrella cinerea
- Greater short-toed lark, Calandrella brachydactyla (A)
- Somali short-toed lark, Alaudala somalica
- Short-tailed lark, Spizocorys fremantlii

== Nicators ==
Order: Passeriformes Family: Nicatoridae

The nicators are shrike-like, with hooked bills. They are endemic to sub-Saharan Africa.

- Western nicator, Nicator chloris
- Eastern nicator, Nicator gularis

== African warblers ==
Order: Passeriformes Family: Macrosphenidae

The African warblers are small to medium-sized insectivores which are found in a wide variety of habitats south of the Sahara.

- Green crombec, Sylvietta virens
- White-browed crombec, Sylvietta leucophrys
- Northern crombec, Sylvietta brachyura
- Red-capped crombec, Sylvietta ruficapilla
- Red-faced crombec, Sylvietta whytii
- Somali crombec, Sylvietta isabellina (A)
- Cape crombec, Sylvietta rufescens
- Moustached grass-warbler, Melocichla mentalis
- Yellow longbill, Macrosphenus flavicans
- Gray longbill, Macrosphenus concolor (A)
- Kretschmer's longbill, Macrosphenus kretschmeri
- Green hylia, Hylia prasina

== Cisticolas and allies ==
Order: Passeriformes Family: Cisticolidae

The Cisticolidae are warblers found mainly in warmer southern regions of the Old World. They are generally very small birds of drab brown or gray appearance found in open country such as grassland or scrub.

- Yellow-vented eremomela, Eremomela flavicrissalis (A)
- Yellow-bellied eremomela, Eremomela icteropygialis
- Greencap eremomela, Eremomela scotops
- Black-necked eremomela, Eremomela atricollis
- White-chinned prinia, Schistolais leucopogon
- African tailorbird, Artisornis metopias
- Long-billed tailorbird, Artisornis moreaui
- Miombo wren-warbler, Calamonastes undosus
- Stierling's wren-warbler, Calamonastes stierlingi
- Gray wren-warbler, Calamonastes simplex
- Green-backed camaroptera, Camaroptera brachyura
- Olive-green camaroptera, Camaroptera chloronota
- Cricket longtail, Spiloptila clamans
- Buff-bellied warbler, Phyllolais pulchella
- Bar-throated apalis, Apalis thoracica
- Taita apalis, Apalis fuscigularis (H)
- Black-throated apalis, Apalis jacksoni
- White-winged apalis, Apalis chariessa (near-threatened)
- Masked apalis, Apalis binotata
- Yellow-breasted apalis, Apalis flavida
- Buff-throated apalis, Apalis rufogularis
- Kungwe apalis, Apalis argentea
- Chestnut-throated apalis, Apalis porphyrolaema
- Chapin's apalis, Apalis chapini
- Black-headed apalis, Apalis melanocephala
- Gray apalis, Apalis cinerea
- Brown-headed apalis, Apalis alticola
- Maasai apalis, Apalis stronachi
- Tawny-flanked prinia, Prinia subflava
- Pale prinia, Prinia somalica (A)
- Red-winged prinia, Prinia erythroptera
- Red-fronted prinia, Prinia rufifrons
- Mrs. Moreau's warbler, Scepomycter winifredae (E) (vulnerable)
- Black-faced rufous-warbler, Bathmocercus rufus
- Gray-capped warbler, Eminia lepida
- Red-faced cisticola, Cisticola erythrops
- Singing cisticola, Cisticola cantans
- Trilling cisticola, Cisticola woosnami
- Chubb's cisticola, Cisticola chubbi
- Hunter's cisticola, Cisticola hunteri
- Black-lored cisticola, Cisticola nigriloris
- Kilombero cisticola, Cisticola bakerorum (E)
- Rock-loving cisticola, Cisticola aberrans
- Rattling cisticola, Cisticola chiniana
- Ashy cisticola, Cisticola cinereolus
- Wailing cisticola, Cisticola lais
- Churring cisticola, Cisticola njombe
- Coastal cisticola, Cisticola haematocephalus
- White-tailed cisticola, Cisticola anderseni (E)
- Chirping cisticola, Cisticola pipiens
- Winding cisticola, Cisticola marginatus
- Rufous-winged cisticola, Cisticola galactotes
- Carruthers's cisticola, Cisticola carruthersi
- Levaillant's cisticola, Cisticola tinniens (A)
- Stout cisticola, Cisticola robustus
- Croaking cisticola, Cisticola natalensis
- Piping cisticola, Cisticola fulvicapillus
- Tabora cisticola, Cisticola angusticaudus
- Siffling cisticola, Cisticola brachypterus
- Tiny cisticola, Cisticola nana
- Zitting cisticola, Cisticola juncidis
- Desert cisticola, Cisticola aridulus
- Black-backed cisticola, Cisticola eximius (A)
- Pectoral-patch cisticola, Cisticola brunnescens
- Pale-crowned cisticola, Cisticola cinnamomeus
- Wing-snapping cisticola, Cisticola ayresii

== Reed warblers and allies ==
Order: Passeriformes Family: Acrocephalidae

The members of this family are usually rather large for "warblers". Most are rather plain olivaceous brown above with much yellow to beige below. They are usually found in open woodland, reedbeds, or tall grass. The family occurs mostly in southern to western Eurasia and surroundings, but it also ranges far into the Pacific, with some species in Africa.

- Eastern olivaceous warbler, Iduna pallida
- African yellow-warbler, Iduna natalensis
- Mountain yellow-warbler, Iduna similis
- Upcher's warbler, Hippolais languida
- Olive-tree warbler, Hippolais olivetorum
- Icterine warbler, Hippolais icterina
- Sedge warbler, Acrocephalus schoenobaenus
- Marsh warbler, Acrocephalus palustris
- Common reed warbler, Acrocephalus scirpaceus
- Basra reed warbler, Acrocephalus griseldis (endangered)
- Lesser swamp warbler, Acrocephalus gracilirostris
- Greater swamp warbler, Acrocephalus rufescens
- Great reed warbler, Acrocephalus arundinaceus

== Grassbirds and allies ==
Order: Passeriformes Family: Locustellidae

Locustellidae are a family of small insectivorous songbirds found mainly in Eurasia, Africa, and the Australian region. They are smallish birds with tails that are usually long and pointed, and tend to be drab brownish or buffy all over.

- Bamboo warbler, Locustella alfredi
- River warbler, Locustella fluviatilis
- Fan-tailed grassbird, Catriscus brevirostris
- Evergreen-forest warbler, Bradypterus lopezi
- Cinnamon bracken-warbler, Bradypterus cinnamomeus
- Little rush warbler, Bradypterus baboecala
- White-winged swamp warbler, Bradypterus carpalis
- Highland rush warbler, Bradypterus centralis (A)

== Swallows ==
Order: Passeriformes Family: Hirundinidae

The family Hirundinidae is adapted to aerial feeding. They have a slender streamlined body, long pointed wings, and a short bill with a wide gape. The feet are adapted to perching rather than walking, and the front toes are partially joined at the base.

- Plain martin, Riparia paludicola
- Bank swallow, Riparia riparia
- Banded martin, Neophedina cincta
- Mascarene martin, Phedina borbonica
- Rock martin, Ptyonoprogne fuligula
- Barn swallow, Hirundo rustica
- Ethiopian swallow, Hirundo aethiopica
- Angola swallow, Hirundo angolensis
- White-throated swallow, Hirundo albigularis
- Wire-tailed swallow, Hirundo smithii
- Pearl-breasted swallow, Hirundo dimidiata (A)
- Montane blue swallow, Hirundo atrocaerulea (vulnerable)
- Greater striped swallow, Cecropis cucullata (A)
- Red-rumped swallow, Cecropis daurica
- Lesser striped swallow, Cecropis abyssinica
- Rufous-chested swallow, Cecropis semirufa
- Mosque swallow, Cecropis senegalensis
- Common house-martin, Delichon urbicum
- White-headed sawwing, Psalidoprocne albiceps
- Black sawwing, Psalidoprocne pristoptera
- Gray-rumped swallow, Pseudhirundo griseopyga

== Bulbuls ==
Order: Passeriformes Family: Pycnonotidae

Bulbuls are medium-sized songbirds. Some are colorful with yellow, red, or orange vents, cheeks, throats, or supercilia, but most are drab, with uniform olive-brown to black plumage. Some species have distinct crests.

- Sombre greenbul, Andropadus importunus
- Slender-billed greenbul, Stelgidillas gracilirostris
- Red-tailed bristlebill, Bleda syndactylus
- Lesser bristlebill, Bleda notatus
- Shelley's greenbul, Arizelocichla masukuensis
- Eastern mountain greenbul, Arizelocichla nigriceps
- Uluguru mountain greenbul, Arizelocichla neumanni (E)
- Yellow-throated mountain greenbul, Arizelocichla chlorigula (E)
- Black-browed mountain greenbul, Arizelocichla fusciceps
- Stripe-cheeked bulbul, Arizelocichla milanjensis
- Yellow-bellied greenbul, Chlorocichla flaviventris
- Joyful greenbul, Chlorocichla laetissima (A)
- Honeyguide greenbul, Baeopogon indicator (A)
- Yellow-throated greenbul, Atimastillas flavicollis
- Spotted greenbul, Ixonotus guttatus
- Gray greenbul, Eurillas gracilis (A)
- Plain greenbul, Eurillas curvirostris
- Yellow-whiskered bulbul, Eurillas latirostris
- Little greenbul, Eurillas virens
- Leaf-love, Phyllastrephus scandens
- Terrestrial brownbul, Phyllastrephus terrestris
- Northern brownbul, Phyllastrephus strepitans
- Gray-olive greenbul, Phyllastrephus cerviniventris
- Baumann's greenbul, Phyllastrephus baumanni (A)
- Toro olive-greenbul, Phyllastrephus hypochloris (A)
- Fischer's greenbul, Phyllastrephus fischeri
- Cabanis's greenbul, Phyllastrephus cabanisi
- Icterine greenbul, Phyllastrephus icterinus
- Xavier's greenbul, Phyllastrephus xavieri
- Yellow-streaked bulbul, Phyllastrephus flavostriatus
- Tiny greenbul, Phyllastrephus debilis
- Usambara greenbul, Phyllastrephus albigula (E) (near-threatened)
- Common bulbul, Pycnonotus barbatus

== Leaf warblers ==
Order: Passeriformes Family: Phylloscopidae

Leaf warblers are a family of small insectivorous birds found mostly in Eurasia and ranging into Wallacea and Africa. The species are of various sizes, often green-plumaged above and yellow below, or more subdued with grayish-green to grayish-brown colors.

- Wood warbler, Phylloscopus sibilatrix
- Willow warbler, Phylloscopus trochilus
- Common chiffchaff, Phylloscopus collybita
- Brown woodland-warbler, Phylloscopus umbrovirens
- Yellow-throated woodland-warbler, Phylloscopus ruficapillus
- Laura's woodland-warbler, Phylloscopus laurae
- Uganda woodland-warbler, Phylloscopus budongoensis

== Bush warblers and allies ==
Order: Passeriformes Family: Scotocercidae

The members of this family are found throughout Africa, Asia, and Polynesia. Their taxonomy is in flux, and some authorities place genus Erythrocerus in another family.

- Yellow flycatcher, Erythrocercus holochlorus
- Livingstone's flycatcher, Erythrocercus livingstonei

== Sylviid warblers, parrotbills, and allies ==
Order: Passeriformes Family: Sylviidae

The family Sylviidae ("Old World warblers") is a group of small insectivorous passerine birds. They mainly occur as breeding species, as one common name implies, in Europe, Asia, and, to a lesser extent, Africa. Most are of generally undistinguished appearance, but many have distinctive songs.

- Eurasian blackcap, Sylvia atricapilla
- Garden warbler, Sylvia borin
- African hill babbler, Sylvia abyssinica
- Rwenzori hill babbler, Sylvia atriceps
- Barred warbler, Curruca nisoria
- Banded parisoma, Curruca boehmi
- Brown parisoma, Curruca lugens
- Greater whitethroat, Curruca communis

== White-eyes, yuhinas, and allies ==
Order: Passeriformes Family: Zosteropidae

The white-eyes are small and mostly undistinguished, their plumage above being generally some dull color like greenish-olive, but some species have a white or bright yellow throat, breast, or lower parts, and several have buff flanks. As their name suggests, many species have a white ring around each eye.

- Pale white-eye, Zosterops flavilateralis
- Mbulu white-eye, Zosterops mbuluensis
- Green white-eye, Zosterops stuhlmanni
- Kilimanjaro white-eye, Zosterops eurycricotus (E)
- Northern yellow white-eye, Zosterops senegalensis
- South Pare white-eye, Zosterops winifredae (E) (vulnerable)
- Southern yellow white-eye, Zosterops anderssoni
- Pemba white-eye, Zosterops vaughani (E)

== Ground babblers and allies ==
Order: Passeriformes Family: Pellorneidae

These small to medium-sized songbirds have soft fluffy plumage but are otherwise rather diverse. Members of the genus Illadopsis are found in forests, but some other genera are birds of scrublands.

- Brown illadopsis, Illadopsis fulvescens
- Pale-breasted illadopsis, Illadopsis rufipennis
- Mountain illadopsis, Illadopsis pyrrhoptera
- Scaly-breasted illadopsis, Illadopsis albipectus

== Laughingthrushes and allies ==
Order: Passeriformes Family: Leiothrichidae

The members of this family are diverse in size and coloration, though those of genus Turdoides tend to be brown or grayish. The family is found in Africa, India, and southeast Asia.

- Rufous chatterer, Argya rubiginosa
- Scaly chatterer, Argya aylmeri
- Brown babbler, Turdoides plebejus (A)
- Scaly babbler, Turdoides squamulata
- Arrow-marked babbler, Turdoides jardineii
- Hartlaub's babbler, Turdoides hartlaubii
- Black-lored babbler, Turdoides sharpei
- Northern pied-babbler, Turdoides hypoleucus

== Treecreepers ==
Order: Passeriformes Family: Certhiidae

Treecreepers are small woodland birds, brown above and white below. They have thin pointed down-curved bills, which they use to extricate insects from bark. They have stiff tail feathers, like woodpeckers, which they use to support themselves on vertical trees.

- African spotted creeper, Salpornis salvadori

== Oxpeckers ==
Order: Passeriformes Family: Buphagidae

As both the English and scientific names of these birds imply, they feed on ectoparasites, primarily ticks, found on large mammals.

- Red-billed oxpecker, Buphagus erythrorynchus
- Yellow-billed oxpecker, Buphagus africanus

== Starlings ==
Order: Passeriformes Family: Sturnidae

Starlings are small to medium-sized passerine birds. Their flight is strong and direct and they are very gregarious. Their preferred habitat is fairly open country. They eat insects and fruit. Plumage is typically dark with a metallic sheen.

- Wattled starling, Creatophora cinerea
- Rosy starling, Pastor roseus (A)
- Violet-backed starling, Cinnyricinclus leucogaster
- Slender-billed starling, Onychognathus tenuirostris
- Neumann's starling, Onychognathus neumanni
- Red-winged starling, Onychognathus morio
- Chestnut-winged starling, Onychognathus fulgidus
- Waller's starling, Onychognathus walleri
- Babbling starling, Neocichla gutturalis
- Magpie starling, Speculipastor bicolor (A)
- Sharpe's starling, Pholia sharpii
- Abbott's starling, Poeoptera femoralis (vulnerable)
- Stuhlmann's starling, Poeoptera stuhlmanni
- Kenrick's starling, Poeoptera kenricki
- Black-bellied starling, Notopholia corrusca
- Hildebrandt's starling, Lamprotornis hildebrandti
- Shelley's starling, Lamprotornis shelleyi (A)
- Rüppell's starling, Lamprotornis purpuropterus
- Ashy starling, Lamprotornis unicolor
- Splendid starling, Lamprotornis splendidus
- Golden-breasted starling, Lamprotornis regius
- Superb starling, Lamprotornis superbus
- Fischer's starling, Lamprotornis fischeri
- Lesser blue-eared starling, Lamprotornis chloropterus
- Sharp-tailed starling, Lamprotornis acuticaudus
- Greater blue-eared starling, Lamprotornis chalybaeus

== Thrushes and allies ==
Order: Passeriformes Family: Turdidae

The thrushes are a group of passerine birds that occur mainly in the Old World. They are plump, soft plumaged, small to medium-sized insectivores or sometimes omnivores, often feeding on the ground. Many have attractive songs.

- Rufous flycatcher-thrush, Neocossyphus fraseri
- Red-tailed ant-thrush, Neocossyphus rufus
- White-tailed ant-thrush, Neocossyphus poensis
- Spotted ground-thrush, Geokichla guttata (A) (endangered)
- Abyssinian ground-thrush, Geokichla piaggiae
- Orange ground-thrush, Geokichla gurneyi
- Groundscraper thrush, Turdus litsitsirupa
- Abyssinian thrush, Turdus abyssinicus
- Usambara thrush, Turdus roehli (E) (near-threatened)
- African bare-eyed thrush, Turdus tephronotus
- Kurrichane thrush, Turdus libonyana
- African thrush, Turdus pelios

== Old World flycatchers ==
Order: Passeriformes Family: Muscicapidae

Old World flycatchers are a large group of small passerine birds native to the Old World. They are mainly small arboreal insectivores. The appearance of these birds is highly varied, but they mostly have weak songs and harsh calls.

- African dusky flycatcher, Muscicapa adusta
- Spotted flycatcher, Muscicapa striata
- Swamp flycatcher, Muscicapa aquatica
- Böhm's flycatcher, Muscicapa boehmi
- Sooty flycatcher, Muscicapa infuscata (A)
- African gray flycatcher, Bradornis microrhynchus
- Pale flycatcher, Agricola pallidus
- Gray-throated tit-flycatcher, Fraseria griseigularis
- Gray tit-flycatcher, Fraseria plumbea
- Ashy flycatcher, Fraseria caerulescens
- Silverbird, Empidornis semipartitus
- Northern black-flycatcher, Melaenornis edolioides
- Southern black-flycatcher, Melaenornis pammelaina
- White-eyed slaty-flycatcher, Melaenornis fischeri
- Fire-crested alethe, Alethe castanea
- Bearded scrub-robin, Cercotrichas quadrivirgata
- Miombo scrub-robin, Cercotrichas barbata
- Rufous-tailed scrub-robin, Cercotrichas galactotes (A)
- Brown-backed scrub-robin, Cercotrichas hartlaubi
- Red-backed scrub-robin, Cercotrichas leucophrys
- Olive-flanked robin-chat, Cossypha anomala
- Cape robin-chat, Cossypha caffra
- Blue-shouldered robin-chat, Cossypha cyanocampter
- Gray-winged robin-chat, Cossypha polioptera
- Rüppell's robin-chat, Cossypha semirufa
- White-browed robin-chat, Cossypha heuglini
- Red-capped robin-chat, Cossypha natalensis
- Snowy-crowned robin-chat, Cossypha niveicapilla
- Collared palm-thrush, Cichladusa arquata
- Spotted morning-thrush, Cichladusa guttata
- White-starred robin, Pogonocichla stellata
- Swynnerton's robin, Swynnertonia swynnertoni (vulnerable)
- Brown-chested alethe, Chamaetylas poliocephala
- White-chested alethe, Chamaetylas fuelleborni
- Yellow-breasted forest robin, Stiphrornis mabirae
- Short-tailed akalat, Sheppardia poensis
- Bocage's akalat, Sheppardia bocagei
- Lowland akalat, Sheppardia cyornithopsis
- Sharpe's akalat, Sheppardia sharpei
- East coast akalat, Sheppardia gunningi (near-threatened)
- Usambara akalat, Sheppardia montana (E) (endangered)
- Iringa akalat, Sheppardia lowei (E) (vulnerable)
- Rubeho akalat, Sheppardia aurantiithorax (E) (endangered)
- White-throated robin, Irania gutturalis
- Thrush nightingale, Luscinia luscinia
- Common nightingale, Luscinia megarhynchos
- Semicollared flycatcher, Ficedula semitorquata
- Collared flycatcher, Ficedula albicollis (A)
- Common redstart, Phoenicurus phoenicurus (A)
- Little rock-thrush, Monticola rufocinereus
- Rufous-tailed rock-thrush, Monticola saxatilis
- Miombo rock-thrush, Monticola angolensis
- Whinchat, Saxicola rubetra
- African stonechat, Saxicola torquatus
- Moorland chat, Pinarochroa sordida
- Mocking cliff-chat, Thamnolaea cinnamomeiventris
- Sooty chat, Myrmecocichla nigra
- Northern anteater-chat, Myrmecocichla aethiops
- Arnot's chat, Myrmecocichla arnotti
- Northern wheatear, Oenanthe oenanthe
- Capped wheatear, Oenanthe pileata
- Isabelline wheatear, Oenanthe isabellina
- Pied wheatear, Oenanthe pleschanka
- Familiar chat, Oenanthe familiaris
- Abyssinian wheatear, Oenanthe lugubris
- Mourning wheatear, Oenanthe lugens

== Dapple-throat and allies ==
Order: Passeriformes Family: Modulatricidae

These species and one other, all of different genera, were formerly placed in family Promeropidae, the sugarbirds, but were accorded their own family in 2017.

- Spot-throat, Modulatrix stictigula
- Dapple-throat, Arcanator orostruthus (vulnerable)

== Sunbirds and spiderhunters ==
Order: Passeriformes Family: Nectariniidae

The sunbirds and spiderhunters are very small passerine birds which feed largely on nectar, although they will also take insects, especially when feeding young. Flight is fast and direct on their short wings. Most species can take nectar by hovering like a hummingbird, but usually perch to feed.

- Fraser's sunbird, Deleornis fraseri
- Gray-headed sunbird, Deleornis axillaris
- Plain-backed sunbird, Anthreptes reichenowi (near-threatened)
- Anchieta's sunbird, Anthreptes anchietae
- Western violet-backed sunbird, Anthreptes longuemarei
- Eastern violet-backed sunbird, Anthreptes orientalis
- Uluguru violet-backed sunbird, Anthreptes neglectus
- Little green sunbird, Anthreptes seimundi (A)
- Green sunbird, Anthreptes rectirostris
- Banded sunbird, Anthreptes rubritorques (E) (vulnerable)
- Collared sunbird, Hedydipna collaris
- Amani sunbird, Hedydipna pallidigaster (endangered)
- Green-headed sunbird, Cyanomitra verticalis
- Blue-throated brown sunbird, Cyanomitra cyanolaema
- Olive sunbird, Cyanomitra olivacea
- Mouse-colored sunbird, Cyanomitra veroxii
- Green-throated sunbird, Chalcomitra rubescens
- Amethyst sunbird, Chalcomitra amethystina
- Scarlet-chested sunbird, Chalcomitra senegalensis
- Hunter's sunbird, Chalcomitra hunteri
- Tacazze sunbird, Nectarinia tacazze
- Bronze sunbird, Nectarinia kilimensis
- Malachite sunbird, Nectarinia famosa
- Red-tufted sunbird, Nectarinia johnstoni
- Golden-winged sunbird, Drepanorhynchus reichenowi
- Olive-bellied sunbird, Cinnyris chloropygius
- Western miombo sunbird, Cinnyris gertrudis
- Eastern miombo sunbird, Cinnyris manoensis
- Montane double-collared sunbird, Cinnyris ludovicensis
- Regal sunbird, Cinnyris regius
- Eastern double-collared sunbird, Cinnyris mediocris
- Usambara double-collared sunbird, Cinnyris usambaricus (near-threatened)
- Forest double-collared sunbird, Cinnyris fuelleborni
- Moreau's sunbird, Cinnyris moreaui (E) (near-threatened)
- Loveridge's sunbird, Cinnyris loveridgei (E) (endangered)
- Beautiful sunbird, Cinnyris pulchellus
- Mariqua sunbird, Cinnyris mariquensis
- Shelley's sunbird, Cinnyris shelleyi
- Red-chested sunbird, Cinnyris erythrocerca
- Black-bellied sunbird, Cinnyris nectarinioides
- Purple-banded sunbird, Cinnyris bifasciatus
- Tsavo sunbird, Cinnyris tsavoensis
- Violet-breasted sunbird, Cinnyris chalcomelas
- Pemba sunbird, Cinnyris pembae (E)
- Orange-tufted sunbird, Cinnyris bouvieri (A)
- Superb sunbird, Cinnyris superbus
- Rufous-winged sunbird, Cinnyris rufipennis (E) (vulnerable)
- Oustalet's sunbird, Cinnyris oustaleti
- White-breasted sunbird, Cinnyris talatala
- Variable sunbird, Cinnyris venustus
- Copper sunbird, Cinnyris cupreus

== Weavers and allies ==
Order: Passeriformes Family: Ploceidae

The weavers are small passerine birds related to the finches. They are seed-eating birds with rounded conical bills. The males of many species are brightly colored, usually in red or yellow and black, and some species show variation in color only in the breeding season.

- White-billed buffalo-weaver, Bubalornis albirostris (A)
- Red-billed buffalo-weaver, Bubalornis niger
- White-headed buffalo-weaver, Dinemellia dinemelli
- Speckle-fronted weaver, Sporopipes frontalis
- White-browed sparrow-weaver, Plocepasser mahali
- Chestnut-backed sparrow-weaver, Plocepasser rufoscapulatus
- Rufous-tailed weaver, Histurgops ruficauda
- Gray-headed social-weaver, Pseudonigrita arnaudi
- Black-capped social-weaver, Pseudonigrita cabanisi
- Red-headed malimbe, Malimbus rubricollis
- Red-headed weaver, Anaplectes rubriceps
- Bertram's weaver, Ploceus bertrandi
- Baglafecht weaver, Ploceus baglafecht
- Little weaver, Ploceus luteolus
- Slender-billed weaver, Ploceus pelzelni
- Black-necked weaver, Ploceus nigricollis
- Spectacled weaver, Ploceus ocularis
- Black-billed weaver, Ploceus melanogaster
- African golden-weaver, Ploceus subaureus
- Holub's golden-weaver, Ploceus xanthops
- Orange weaver, Ploceus aurantius
- Golden palm weaver, Ploceus bojeri
- Taveta golden-weaver, Ploceus castaneiceps
- Southern brown-throated weaver, Ploceus xanthopterus
- Northern brown-throated weaver, Ploceus castanops
- Kilombero weaver, Ploceus burnieri (E) (vulnerable)
- Lesser masked-weaver, Ploceus intermedius
- Vitelline masked-weaver, Ploceus vitellinus
- Tanganyika masked-weaver, Ploceus reichardi (E) Some sightings in Zambia
- Speke's weaver, Ploceus spekei
- Vieillot's black weaver, Ploceus nigerrimus
- Village weaver, Ploceus cucullatus
- Weyns's weaver, Ploceus weynsi
- Black-headed weaver, Ploceus melanocephalus
- Golden-backed weaver, Ploceus jacksoni
- Chestnut weaver, Ploceus rubiginosus
- Forest weaver, Ploceus bicolor
- Brown-capped weaver, Ploceus insignis
- Olive-headed weaver, Ploceus olivaceiceps (near-threatened)
- Usambara weaver, Ploceus nicolli (E) (endangered)
- Compact weaver, Pachyphantes superciliosus
- Cardinal quelea, Quelea cardinalis
- Red-headed quelea, Quelea erythrops
- Red-billed quelea, Quelea quelea
- Southern red bishop, Euplectes orix
- Zanzibar red bishop, Euplectes nigroventris
- Black-winged bishop, Euplectes hordeaceus
- Black bishop, Euplectes gierowii
- Yellow-crowned bishop, Euplectes afer
- Fire-fronted bishop, Euplectes diadematus
- Yellow bishop, Euplectes capensis
- White-winged widowbird, Euplectes albonotatus
- Yellow-mantled widowbird, Euplectes macroura
- Red-collared widowbird, Euplectes ardens
- Red-cowled widowbird, Euplectes laticauda
- Fan-tailed widowbird, Euplectes axillaris
- Marsh widowbird, Euplectes hartlaubi
- Buff-shouldered widowbird, Euplectes psammocromius
- Jackson's widowbird, Euplectes jacksoni (near-threatened)
- Grosbeak weaver, Amblyospiza albifrons

== Waxbills and allies ==
Order: Passeriformes Family: Estrildidae

The estrildid finches are small passerine birds of the Old World tropics and Australasia. They are gregarious and often colonial seed eaters with short thick but pointed bills. They are all similar in structure and habits, but have wide variation in plumage colors and patterns.

- Gray-headed silverbill, Spermestes griseicapilla
- Bronze mannikin, Spermestes cucullata
- Magpie mannikin, Spermestes fringilloides
- Black-and-white mannikin, Spermestes bicolor
- African silverbill, Euodice cantans
- Java sparrow, Padda oryzivora (I) (endangered)
- White-collared oliveback, Nesocharis ansorgei
- Yellow-bellied waxbill, Coccopygia quartinia
- Green-backed twinspot, Mandingoa nitidula
- Abyssinian crimsonwing, Cryptospiza salvadorii
- Red-faced crimsonwing, Cryptospiza reichenovii
- Jameson's antpecker, Parmoptila jamesoni (A)
- White-breasted nigrita, Nigrita fusconotus (A)
- Gray-headed nigrita, Nigrita canicapilla
- Black-faced waxbill, Brunhilda erythronotos
- Black-cheeked waxbill, Brunhilda charmosyna
- Black-tailed waxbill, Glaucestrilda perreini
- Black-crowned waxbill, Estrilda nonnula
- Fawn-breasted waxbill, Estrilda paludicola
- Common waxbill, Estrilda astrild
- Black-rumped waxbill, Estrilda troglodytes (A)
- Crimson-rumped waxbill, Estrilda rhodopyga
- Quailfinch, Ortygospiza atricollis
- Locustfinch, Paludipasser locustella
- Cut-throat, Amadina fasciata
- Zebra waxbill, Amandava subflava
- Purple grenadier, Granatina ianthinogaster
- Southern cordonbleu, Uraeginthus angolensis
- Red-cheeked cordonbleu, Uraeginthus bengalus
- Blue-capped cordonbleu, Uraeginthus cyanocephalus
- Red-headed bluebill, Spermophaga ruficapilla
- Lesser seedcracker, Pyrenestes minor
- Black-bellied seedcracker, Pyrenestes ostrinus
- Green-winged pytilia, Pytilia melba
- Orange-winged pytilia, Pytilia afra
- Peters's twinspot, Hypargos niveoguttatus
- Red-billed firefinch, Lagonosticta senegala
- African firefinch, Lagonosticta rubricata
- Jameson's firefinch, Lagonosticta rhodopareia
- Brown firefinch, Lagonosticta nitidula

== Indigobirds ==
Order: Passeriformes Family: Viduidae

The indigobirds are finch-like species which usually have black or indigo predominating in their plumage. All are brood parasites which lay their eggs in the nests of estrildid finches.

- Pin-tailed whydah, Vidua macroura
- Broad-tailed paradise-whydah, Vidua obtusa
- Eastern paradise-whydah, Vidua paradisaea
- Steel-blue whydah, Vidua hypocherina
- Straw-tailed whydah, Vidua fischeri
- Village indigobird, Vidua chalybeata
- Wilson's indigobird, Vidua wilsoni
- Variable indigobird, Vidua funerea
- Purple indigobird, Vidua purpurascens
- Green indigobird, Vidua codringtoni
- Parasitic weaver, Anomalospiza imberbis

== Old World sparrows ==
Order: Passeriformes Family: Passeridae

Sparrows are small passerine birds. In general, sparrows tend to be small, plump, brown or gray birds with short tails and short powerful beaks. Sparrows are seed eaters, but they also consume small insects.

- House sparrow, Passer domesticus (I)
- Kenya rufous sparrow, Passer rufocinctus
- Northern gray-headed sparrow, Passer griseus
- Parrot-billed sparrow, Passer gongonensis
- Swahili sparrow, Passer suahelicus
- Southern gray-headed sparrow, Passer diffusus
- Chestnut sparrow, Passer eminibey
- Yellow-spotted bush sparrow, Gymnoris pyrgita
- Yellow-throated bush sparrow, Gymnoris superciliaris

== Wagtails and pipits ==
Order: Passeriformes Family: Motacillidae

Motacillidae is a family of small passerine birds with medium to long tails. They include the wagtails, longclaws, and pipits. They are slender ground-feeding insectivores of open country.

- Cape wagtail, Motacilla capensis
- Mountain wagtail, Motacilla clara
- Gray wagtail, Motacilla cinerea
- Western yellow wagtail, Motacilla flava
- African pied wagtail, Motacilla aguimp
- White wagtail, Motacilla alba
- African pipit, Anthus cinnamomeus
- Woodland pipit, Anthus nyassae
- Long-billed pipit, Anthus similis
- Plain-backed pipit, Anthus leucophrys
- Buffy pipit, Anthus vaalensis
- Striped pipit, Anthus lineiventris
- Tree pipit, Anthus trivialis
- Red-throated pipit, Anthus cervinus
- Short-tailed pipit, Anthus brachyurus
- Bush pipit, Anthus caffer
- Sokoke pipit, Anthus sokokensis (endangered)
- Golden pipit, Tmetothylacus tenellus
- Yellow-throated longclaw, Macronyx croceus
- Fülleborn's longclaw, Macronyx fuellebornii
- Pangani longclaw, Macronyx aurantiigula
- Rosy-throated longclaw, Macronyx ameliae

== Finches, euphonias, and allies ==
Order: Passeriformes Family: Fringillidae

Finches are seed-eating passerine birds that are small to moderately large and have a strong beak, usually conical and in some species very large. All have twelve tail feathers and nine primaries. These birds have a bouncing flight with alternating bouts of flapping and gliding on closed wings, and most sing well.

- Oriole finch, Linurgus olivaceus
- Yellow-fronted canary, Crithagra mozambica
- Western citril, Crithagra frontalis
- Southern citril, Crithagra hyposticuta
- Papyrus canary, Crithagra koliensis
- Black-throated canary, Crithagra atrogularis
- Reichenow's seedeater, Crithagra reichenowi
- White-bellied canary, Crithagra dorsostriata
- Southern grosbeak-canary, Crithagra buchanani
- Brimstone canary, Crithagra sulphurata
- Streaky seedeater, Crithagra striolata
- Yellow-browed seedeater, Crithagra whytii
- Thick-billed seedeater, Crithagra burtoni
- Tanzania seedeater, Crithagra melanochroa (E)
- Black-eared seedeater, Crithagra mennelli
- Reichard's seedeater, Crithagra reichardi
- Yellow-crowned canary, Serinus flavivertex

== Old World buntings ==
Order: Passeriformes Family: Emberizidae

The emberizids are a large family of passerine birds. They are seed-eating birds with distinctively shaped bills. Many emberizid species have distinctive head patterns.

- Ortolan bunting, Emberiza hortulana (A)
- Cabanis's bunting, Emberiza cabanisi
- Golden-breasted bunting, Emberiza flaviventris
- Somali bunting, Emberiza poliopleura
- Vincent's bunting, Emberiza vincenti
- Cinnamon-breasted bunting, Emberiza tahapisi

== See also ==
- List of birds
- Lists of birds by region
