= Longbill =

Longbill may refer to:

- One of two species of longbill in the bird family Melanocharitidae
- One of six species of longbill, African "warblers" in the genera Macrosphenus and Amaurocichla
- The longbill spearfish, a species of marlin
