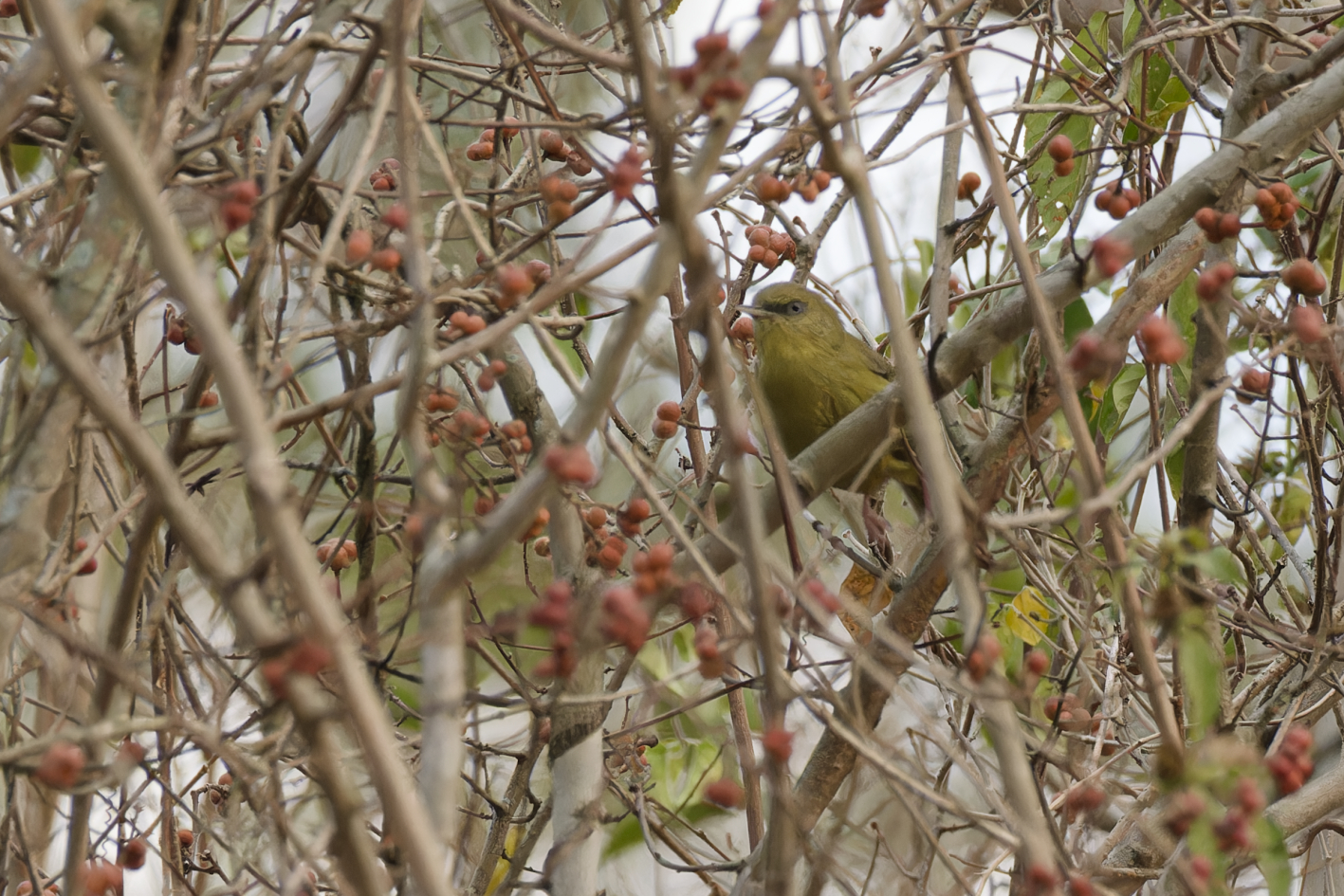

Conservation status
- Endangered (IUCN 3.1)

Scientific classification
- Kingdom: Animalia
- Phylum: Chordata
- Class: Aves
- Order: Passeriformes
- Family: Macrosphenidae
- Genus: Macrosphenus
- Species: M. pulitzeri

Binomial name
- Macrosphenus pulitzeri Boulton, 1931
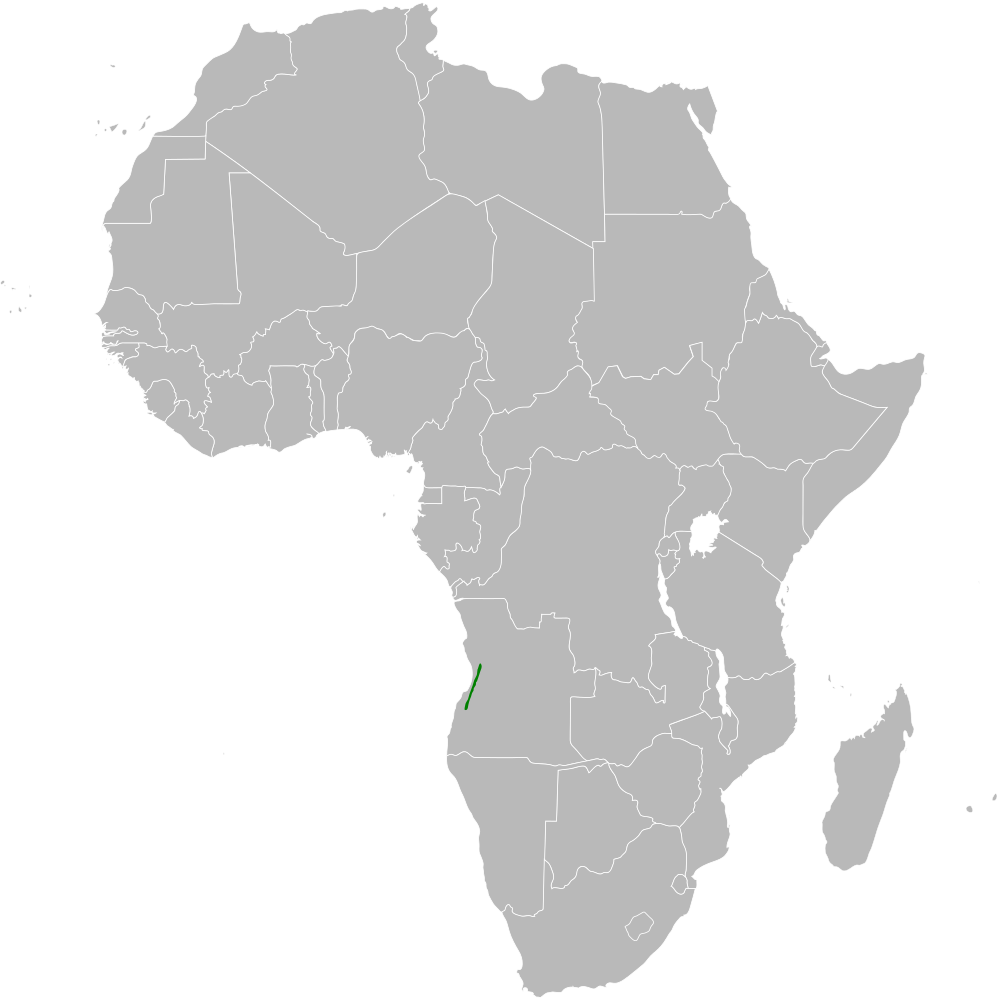

= Pulitzer's longbill =

Species of bird

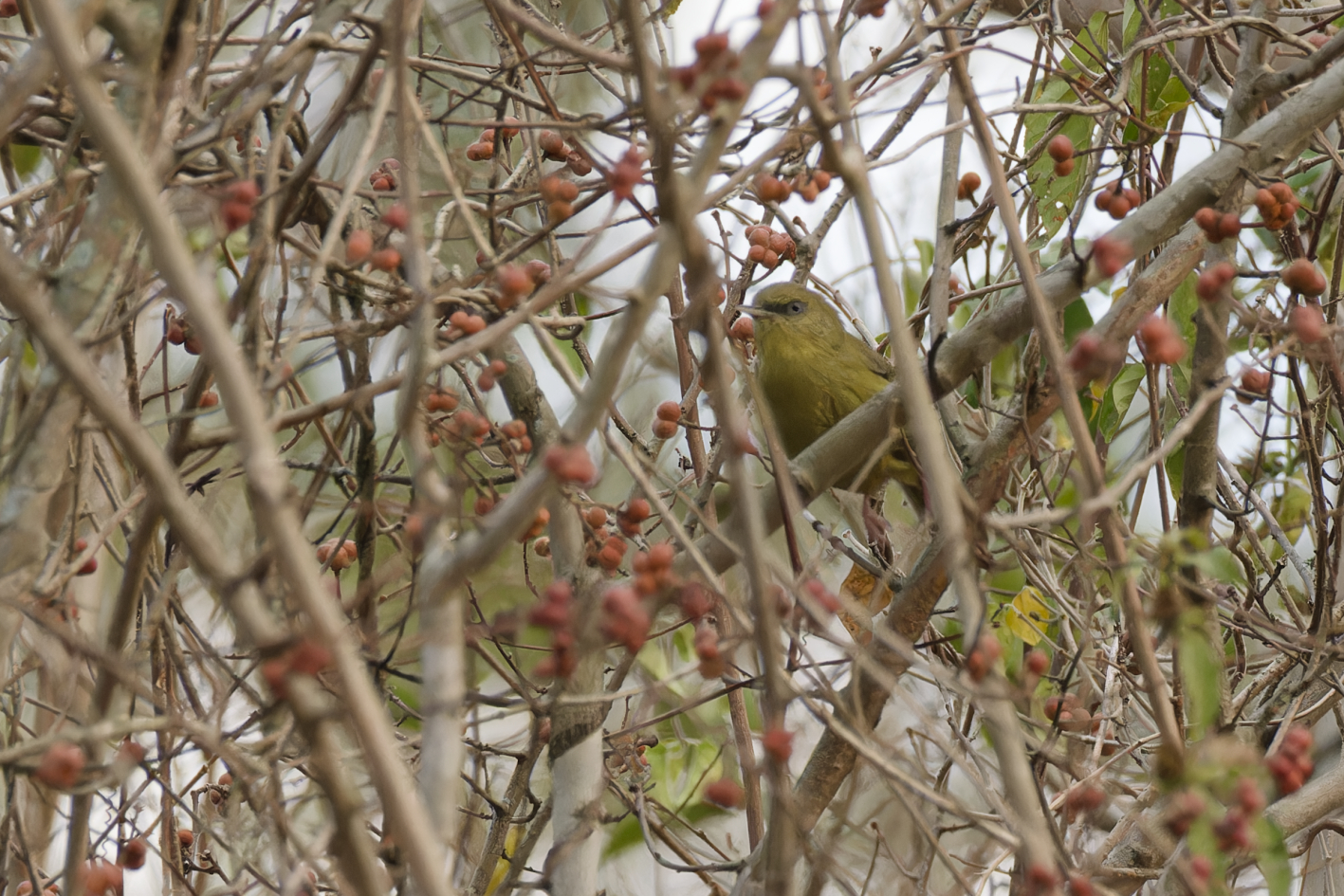
Pulitzer's Longbill at Angola

Pulitzer's longbill (Macrosphenus pulitzeri) is a species of bird. Formerly considered an "Old World warbler" and placed in the family Sylviidae, it is now considered to belong to a group of enigmatic African warblers in the family Macrosphenidae. It is found only in Angola.

Its natural habitat is subtropical or tropical dry forests. It is threatened by habitat loss.
