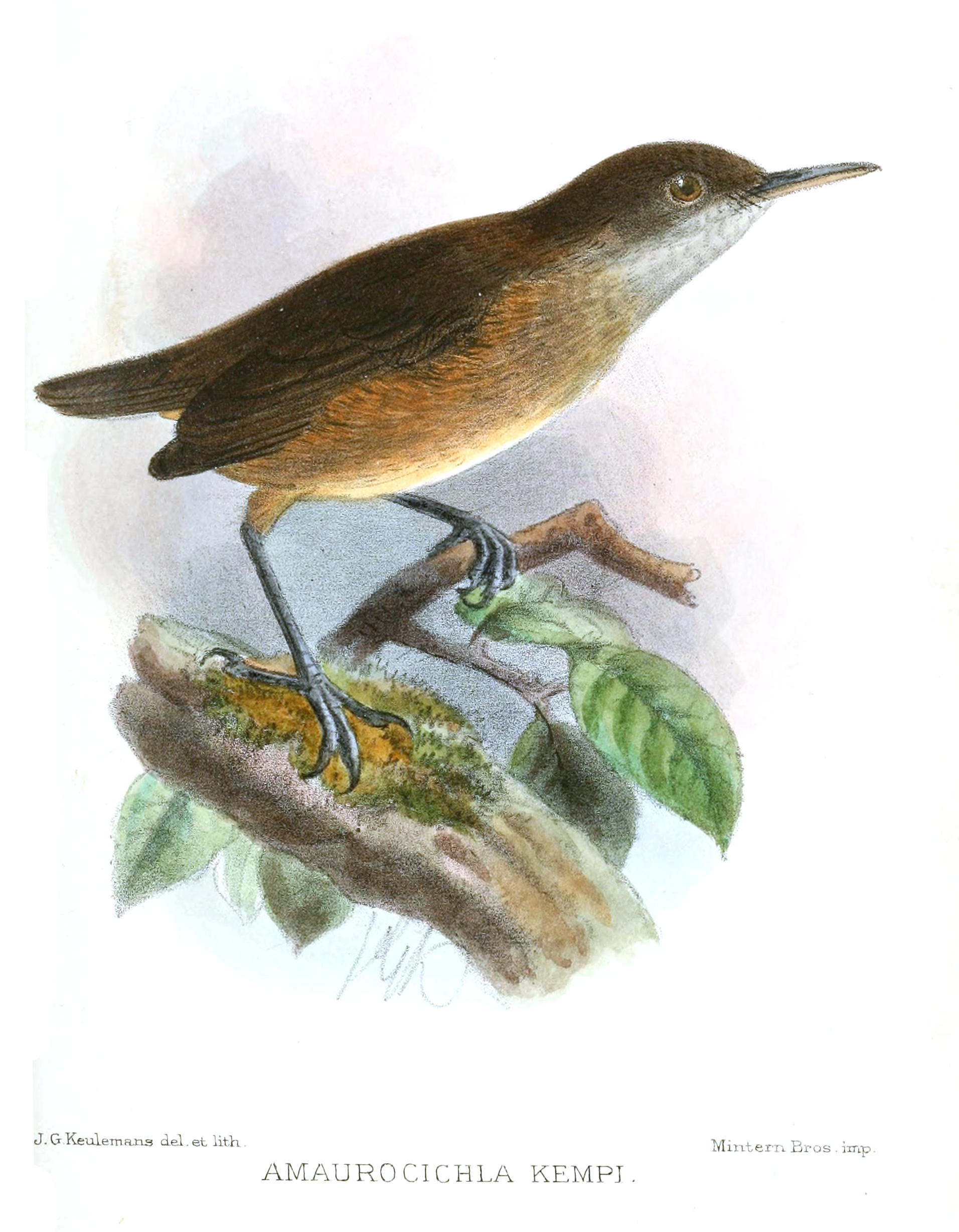
- Painted by John Gerrard Keulemans, 1905

Conservation status
- Least Concern (IUCN 3.1)

Scientific classification
- Kingdom: Animalia
- Phylum: Chordata
- Class: Aves
- Order: Passeriformes
- Family: Macrosphenidae
- Genus: Macrosphenus
- Species: M. kempi

Binomial name
- Macrosphenus kempi (Sharpe, 1905)
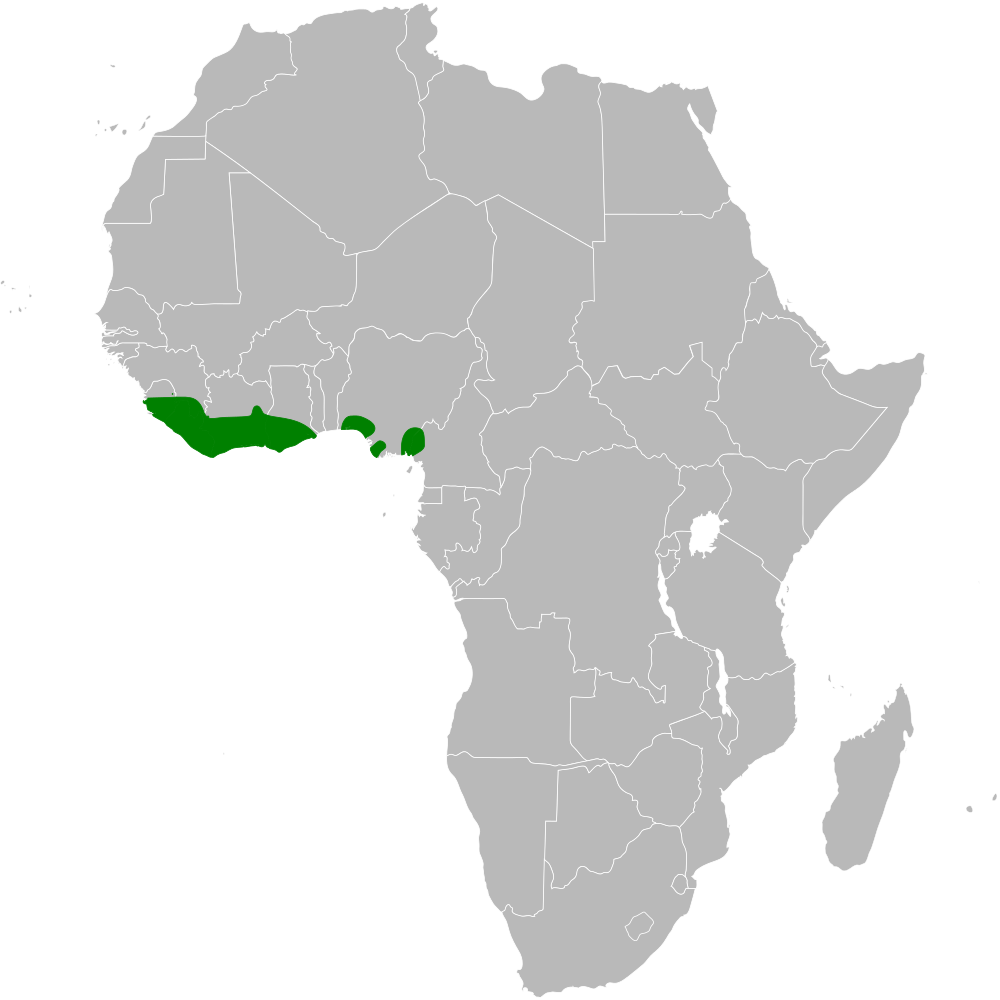

= Kemp's longbill =

Species of bird

Kemp's longbill (Macrosphenus kempi) is a species of Old World warbler in the family Macrosphenidae. It is found in Cameroon, Ivory Coast, Ghana, Guinea, Liberia, Nigeria, and Sierra Leone. Its natural habitat is subtropical or tropical moist lowland forests.
