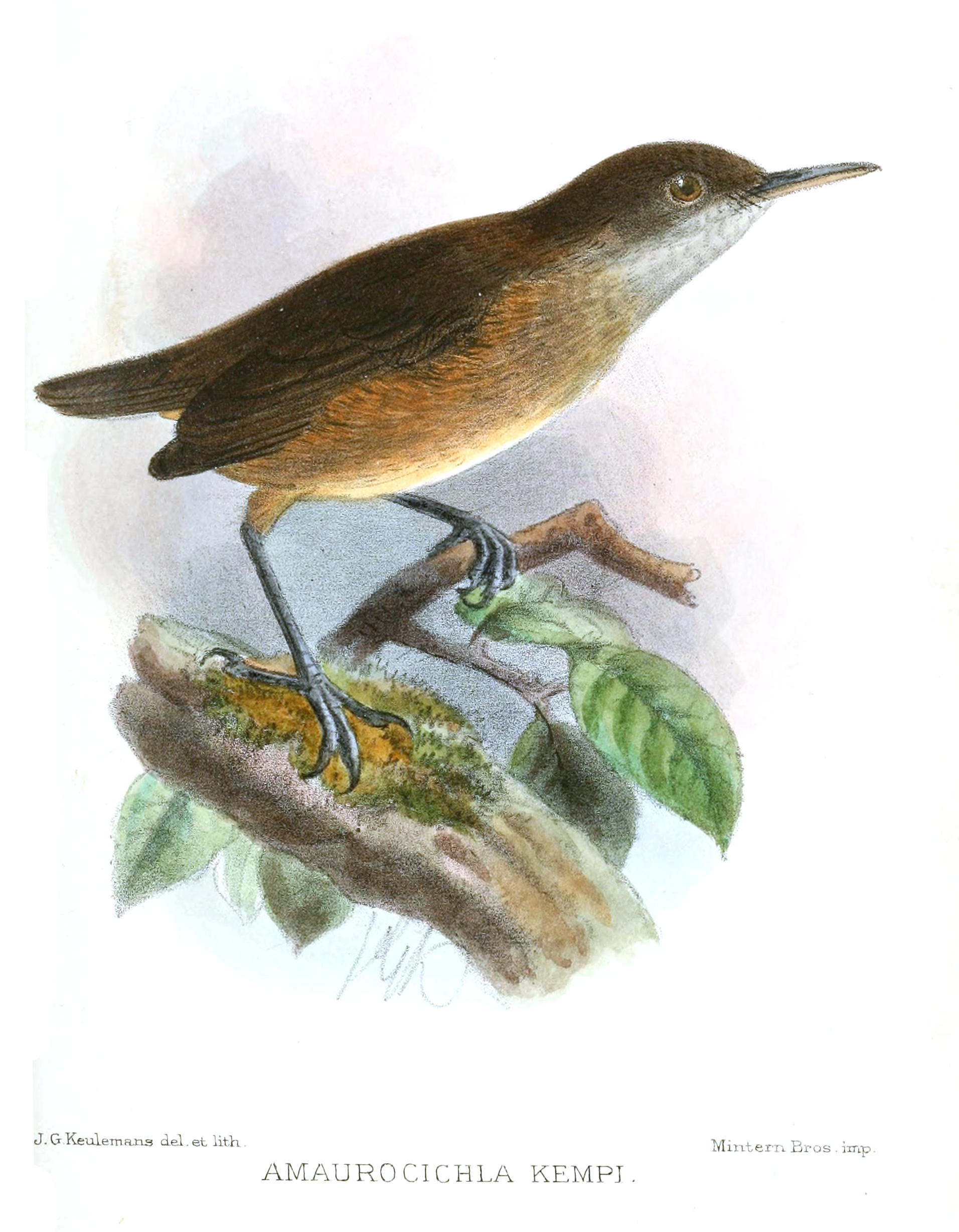
- Kemp's longbill (Macrosphenus kempi)

Scientific classification
- Kingdom: Animalia
- Phylum: Chordata
- Class: Aves
- Order: Passeriformes
- Family: Macrosphenidae
- Genus: Macrosphenus; Cassin, 1859

Type species
- Macrosphenus flavicans Cassin, 1859

= Macrosphenus =

Genus of birds

Macrosphenus is a genus of African warblers, formerly placed in the family Sylviidae. It is one of two genera in that family known as longbills.

== Taxonomy and systematics ==
=== Extant species ===
The genus contains the following five species:

Image	Common name	Scientific name	Distribution
	Yellow longbill	Macrosphenus flavicans	Angola, Cameroon, Central African Republic, the Democratic Republic of the Congo, Equatorial Guinea, Gabon, Nigeria, South Sudan, Sudan, United Republic of Tanzania, and Uganda.
	Kemp's longbill	Macrosphenus kempi	Cameroon, Ivory Coast, Ghana, Guinea, Liberia, Nigeria, and Sierra Leone.
	Grey longbill	Macrosphenus concolor	African tropical rainforest.
	Pulitzer's longbill	Macrosphenus pulitzeri	Only in Angola.
	Kretschmer's longbill	Macrosphenus kretschmeri	Kenya, Mozambique, and Tanzania.

=== Former species ===
Some authorities, either presently or formerly, recognize several additional species as belonging to the genus Macrosphenus including:

- Montane tiny greenbul (as Macrosphenus albigula)
