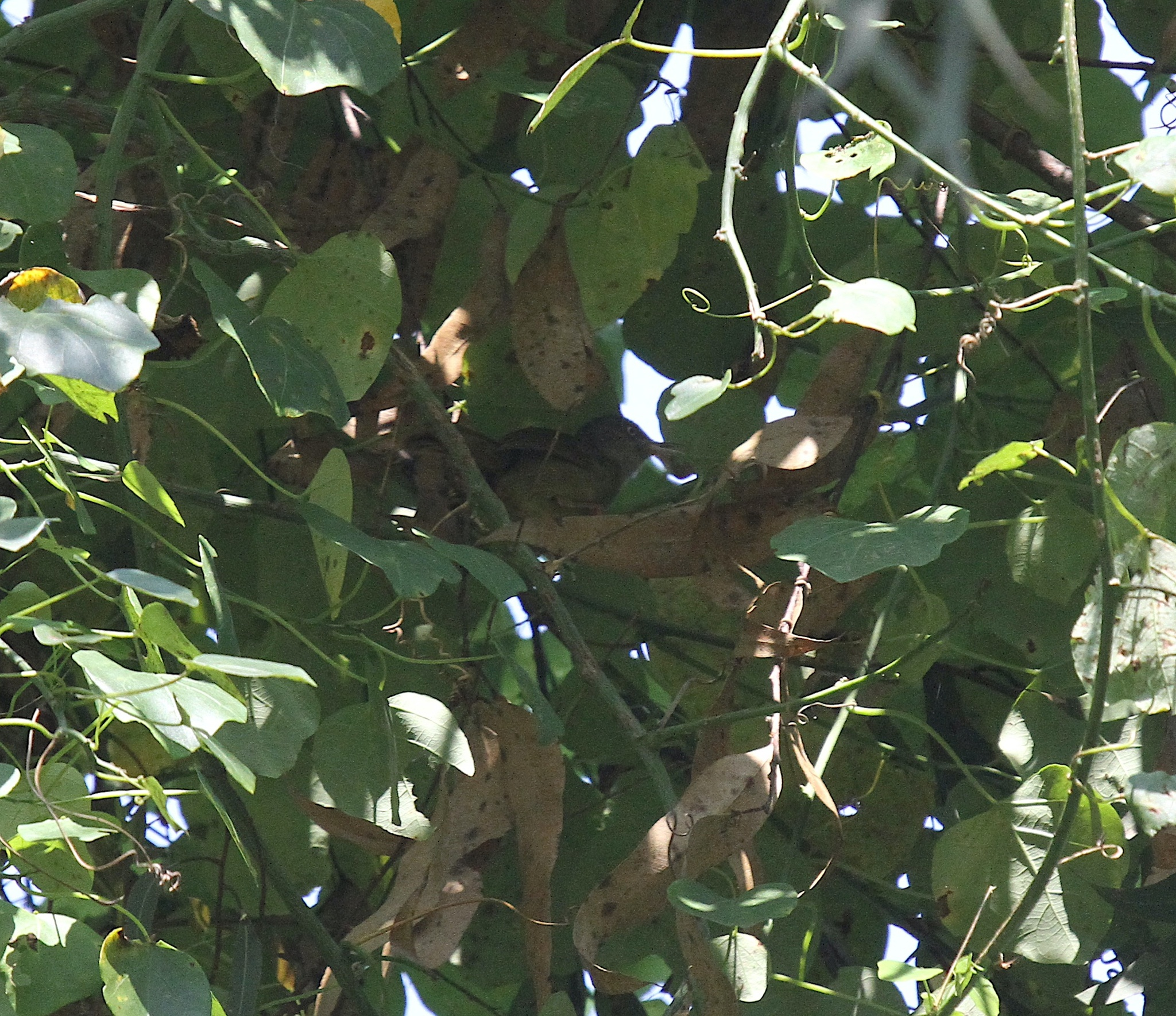

Conservation status
- Least Concern (IUCN 3.1)

Scientific classification
- Kingdom: Animalia
- Phylum: Chordata
- Class: Aves
- Order: Passeriformes
- Family: Macrosphenidae
- Genus: Macrosphenus
- Species: M. kretschmeri

Binomial name
- Macrosphenus kretschmeri (Reichenow & Neumann, 1895)
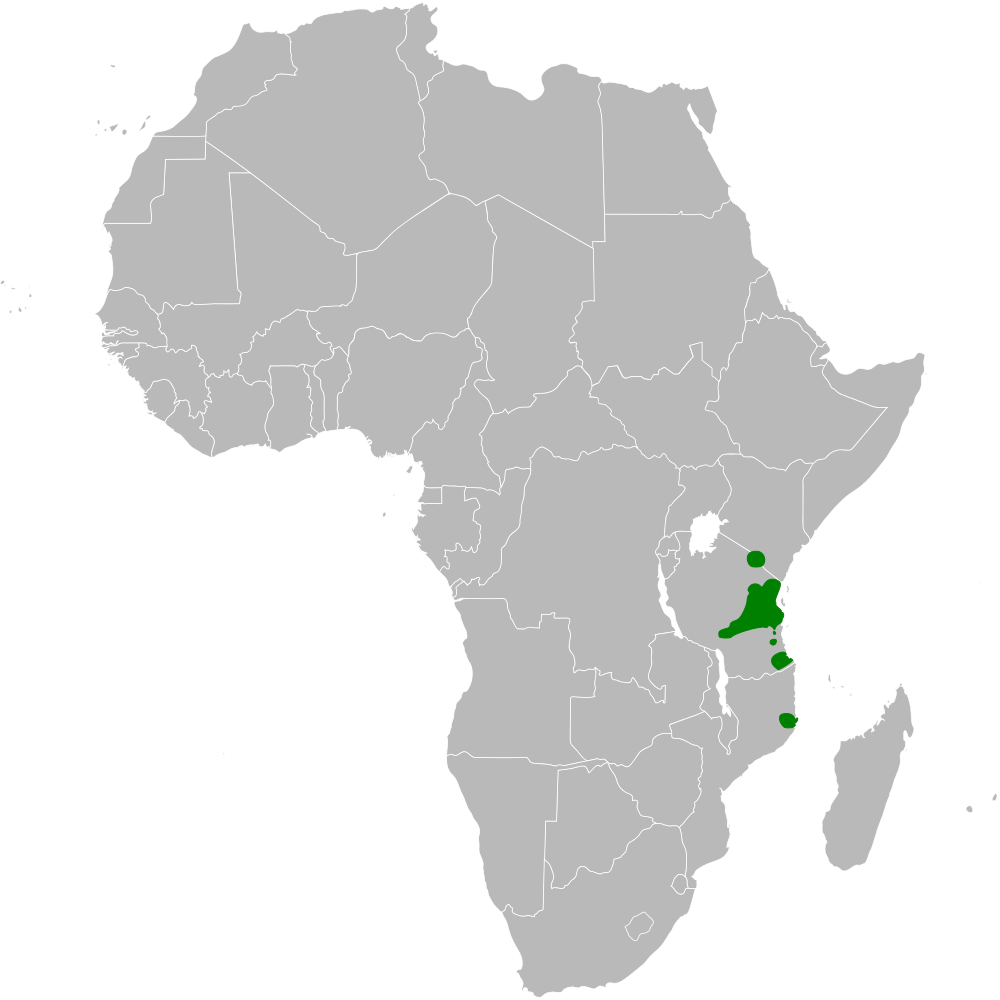

= Kretschmer's longbill =

Species of bird

Kretschmer's longbill (Macrosphenus kretschmeri) is a species of Old World warbler in the family Macrosphenidae. It is found in Kenya, Mozambique, and Tanzania. Its natural habitats are subtropical or tropical moist lowland forests and subtropical or tropical moist montane forests.
