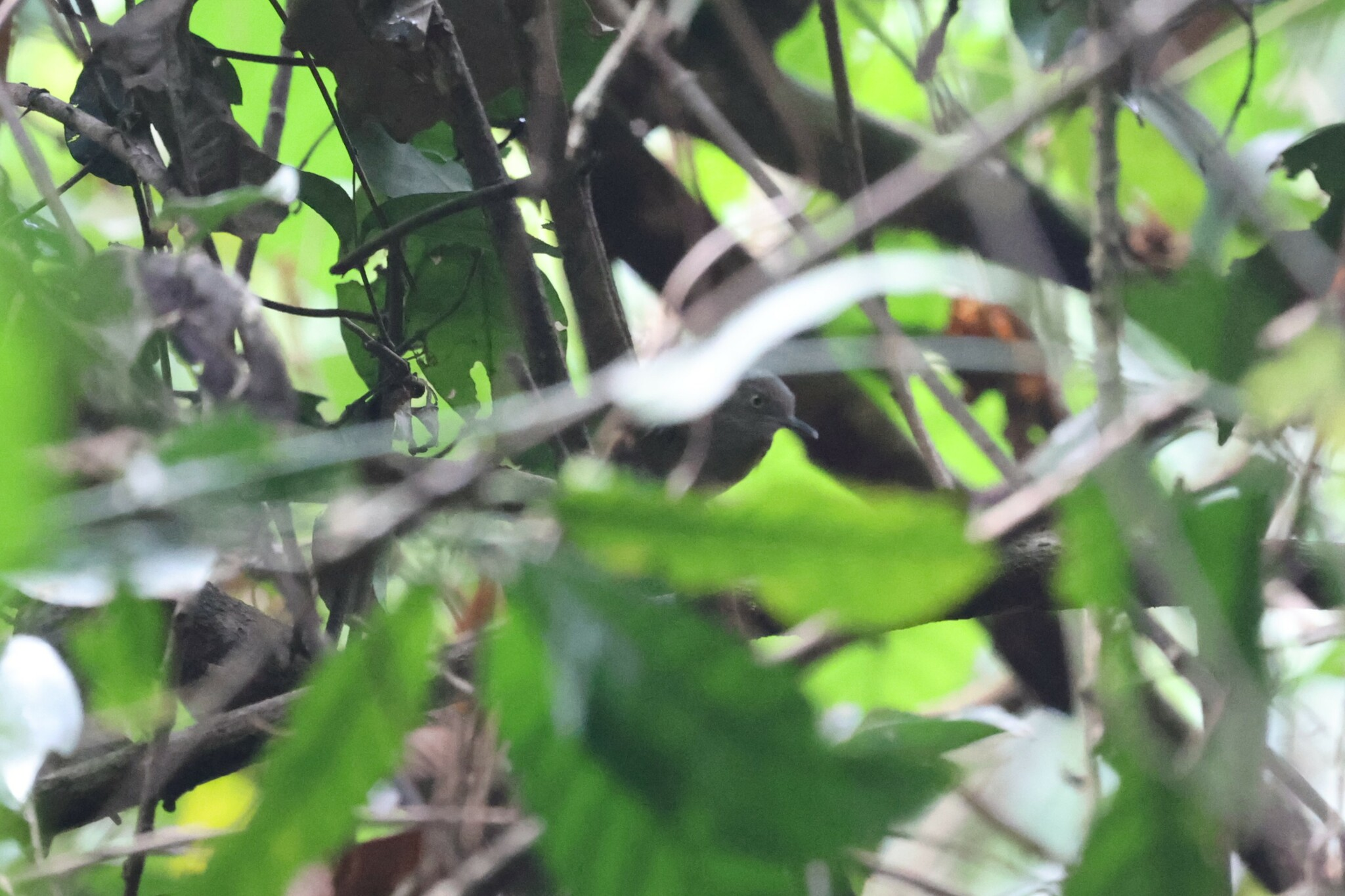

Conservation status
- Least Concern (IUCN 3.1)

Scientific classification
- Kingdom: Animalia
- Phylum: Chordata
- Class: Aves
- Order: Passeriformes
- Family: Macrosphenidae
- Genus: Macrosphenus
- Species: M. flavicans

Binomial name
- Macrosphenus flavicans Cassin, 1859
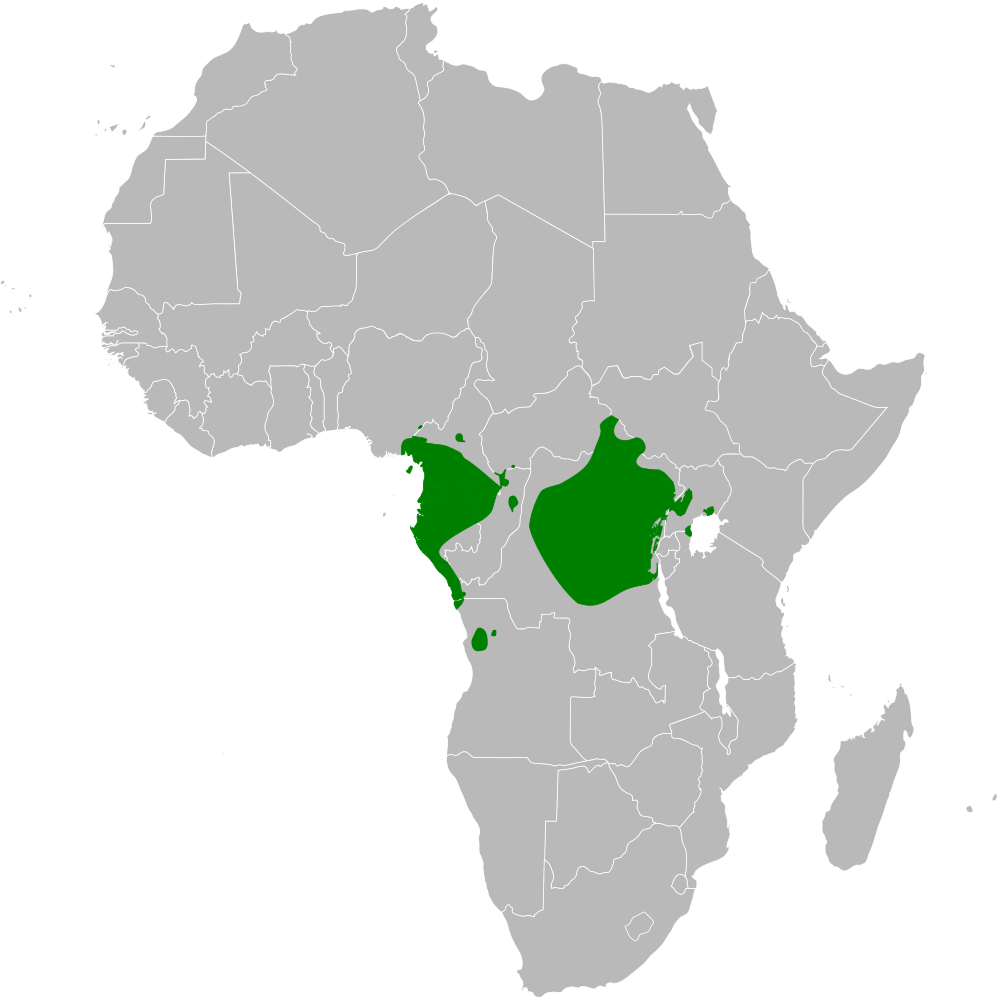

= Yellow longbill =

Species of bird

The yellow longbill (Macrosphenus flavicans) is a species of Old World warbler in the family Macrosphenidae. Its natural habitats are subtropical or tropical moist lowland forests and subtropical or tropical moist montane forests.

== Description ==
The yellow longbill, on average, measures 13 cm from bill to tail and weighs 11-16g. It is medium in size. It has a short tail and a black long straight bill with a small hook at the tip. It has a yellow iris and greenish-yellow underparts. It is dark olive-gray at the top of its head. Its feathers transition to dark olive-green on the upperparts and upper wing and become yellow-tinged on long loose feathers on the back and rump. Sexes are alike in plumage, male being larger than female. The yellow longbill has a span of life of 3.6 years. The current population trend of the yellow longbill is stable. The number of mature individuals is unknown, as is the continuing decline of mature individuals.

== Distribution and habitat ==
The yellow longbill's habitat is in the forest, more specifically the subtropical and tropical moist lowland. Lowland habitats are of the lower and middle levels, including the primary and secondary forest. These forest habitat lowlands involve edges, clearings and logged areas. Lowlands range to levels of 1000-1400m in Uganda and to 1800m in the eastern Democratic Republic of Congo. The geographic range for the yellow longbill includes Angola, Cameroon, Central African Republic, the Democratic Republic of the Congo, Equatorial Guinea, Gabon, Nigeria, South Sudan, Sudan, United Republic of Tanzania, and Uganda. Specific distributions for subspecies have been identified. The Macrosphenus flavicans flavicans subspecies is distributed throughout extreme southeast Nigeria, Bioko, and southwest and south Cameroon south to lower River Congo and northwest Angola. The Macrosphenus flavicans hypochondriacus subspecies is distributed throughout southeast Central African Republic, southwest South Sudan (Bengangai Forest), north, central, and east Democratic Republic of the Congo, west and south Uganda and northwest Tanzania (Minziro Forest).

== Diet ==
The diet of a yellow longbill consists of spiders and insects, such as moths, caterpillars, and beetles. Their diet also includes some fruit, making them omnivorous. Yellow longbills forage in pairs or in family groups. Forage groups are sometimes mixed in species. They forage among thick and tangled undergrowth. They also forage in lower canopy areas, especially during the dry season.

== Conservation ==
The conservation status of the yellow longbill is classified as of least concern. This classification was assessed on October 1, 2016. They are not globally threatened. They are common in many areas of their range. Two discrete populations of the yellow longbill exist in forests of West and Central Africa. There are few conservation actions in place for the yellow longbill. There are no in-place research and monitoring actions. There are land and water identified conservation sites in place. There are no species management or education conservation actions in place.
