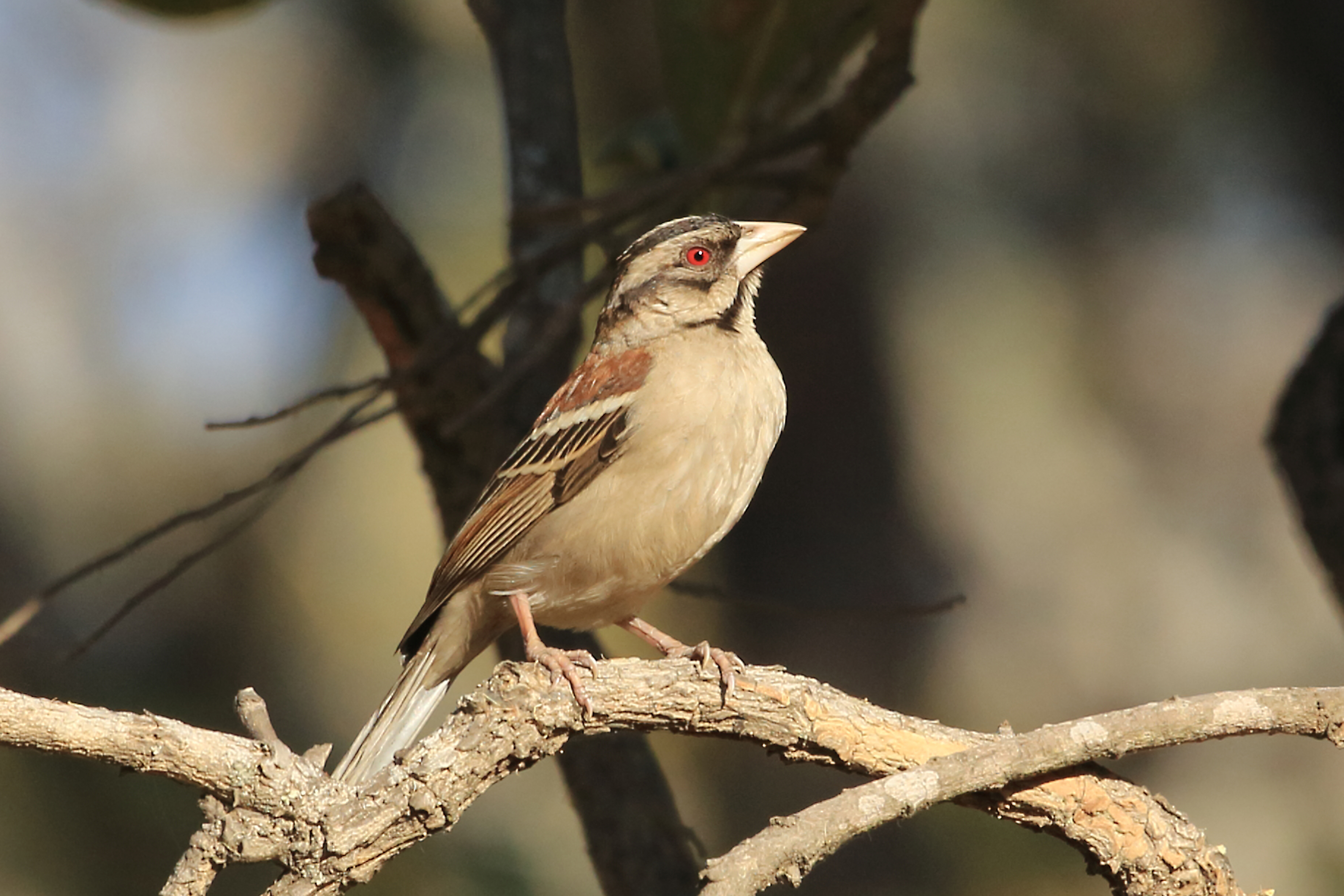

Conservation status
- Least Concern (IUCN 3.1)

Scientific classification
- Kingdom: Animalia
- Phylum: Chordata
- Class: Aves
- Order: Passeriformes
- Family: Ploceidae
- Genus: Plocepasser
- Species: P. rufoscapulatus

Binomial name
- Plocepasser rufoscapulatus Büttikofer, 1888

= Chestnut-backed sparrow-weaver =

Species of bird

The chestnut-backed sparrow-weaver (Plocepasser rufoscapulatus) is a species of bird in the family Ploceidae.

It is found in southern Africa from Angola and southern Democratic Republic of Congo to Zambia and Malawi.
