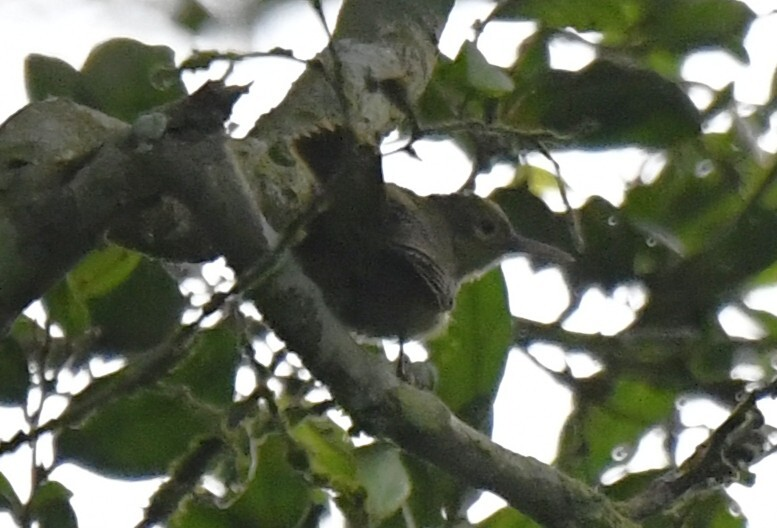

Conservation status
- Least Concern (IUCN 3.1)

Scientific classification
- Kingdom: Animalia
- Phylum: Chordata
- Class: Aves
- Order: Passeriformes
- Family: Macrosphenidae
- Genus: Macrosphenus
- Species: M. concolor

Binomial name
- Macrosphenus concolor (Hartlaub, 1857)
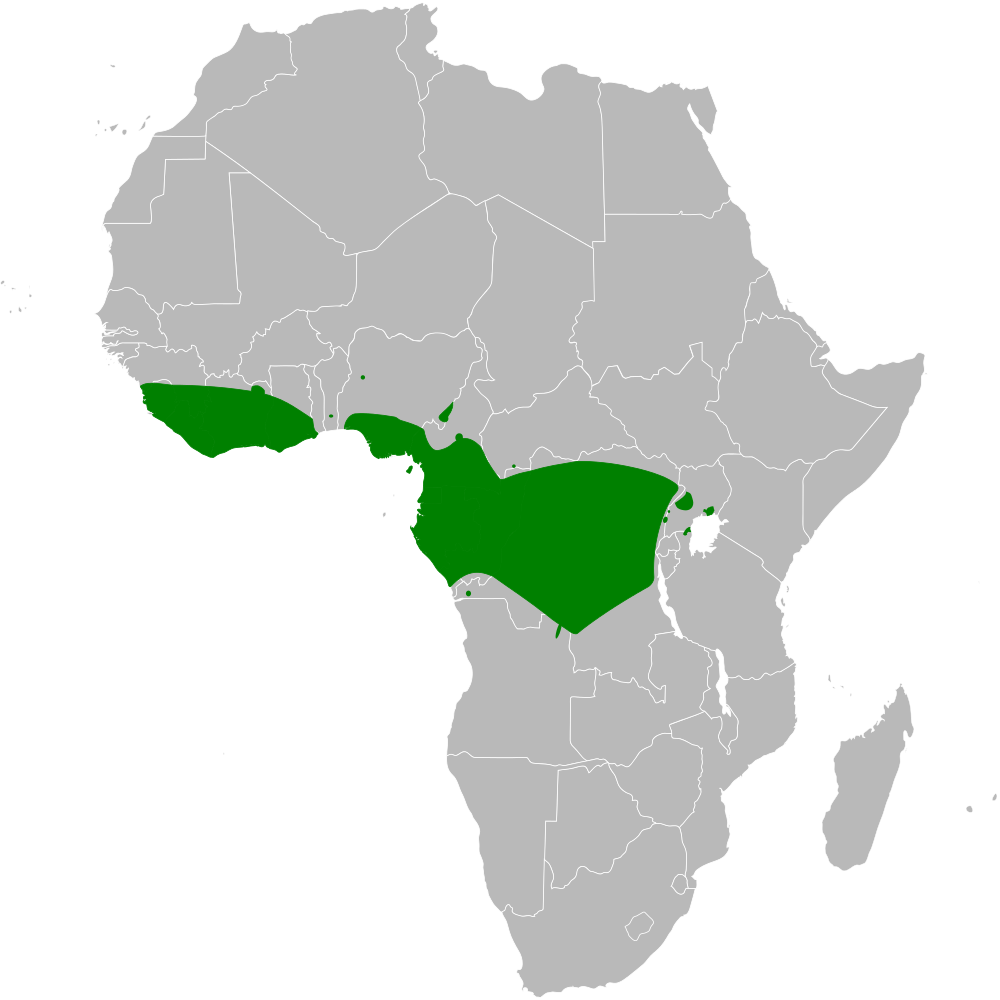

= Grey longbill =

Species of bird

The grey longbill (Macrosphenus concolor) is a species of Old World warbler in the family Macrosphenidae. It is native to African tropical rainforest.
