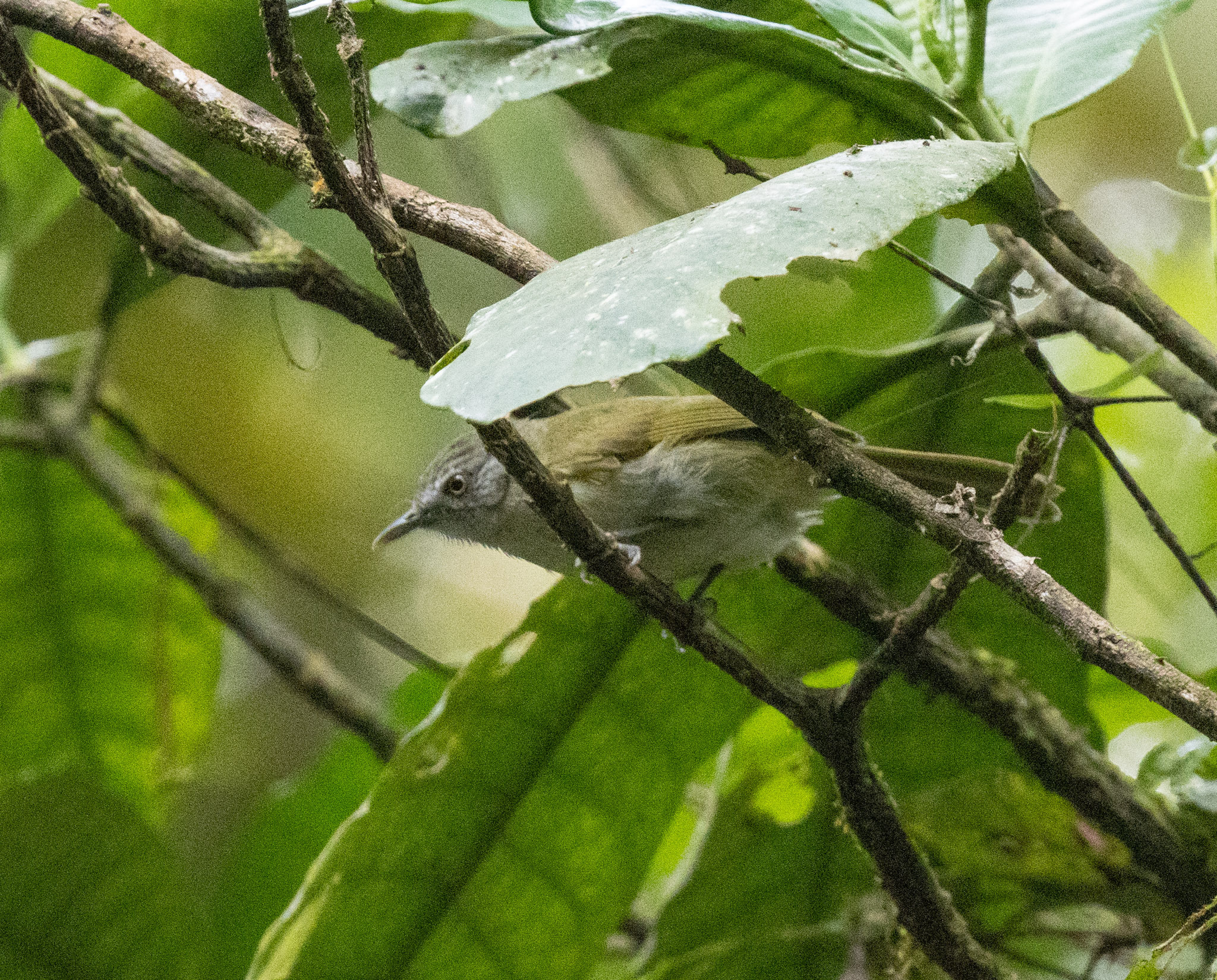

Conservation status
- Near Threatened (IUCN 3.1)

Scientific classification
- Kingdom: Animalia
- Phylum: Chordata
- Class: Aves
- Order: Passeriformes
- Family: Pycnonotidae
- Genus: Phyllastrephus
- Species: P. albigula

Binomial name
- Phyllastrephus albigula (Grote, 1919)

Synonyms
- Phyllastrephus debilis albigula; Phyllastrephus rabai albigula; Macrosphenus albigula

= Montane tiny greenbul =

Species of songbird

The montane tiny greenbul (Phyllastrephus albigula) is a species of songbird in the bulbul family, Pycnonotidae. It is endemic to the Usambara and Nguru Mountains in Tanzania. Its natural habitats are subtropical or tropical moist montane forests and subtropical or tropical moist shrubland.

== Taxonomy and systematics ==
The lowland tiny greenbul was originally described in the genus Macrosphenus. Until 2009, the montane tiny greenbul was considered as conspecific with the lowland tiny greenbul as the tiny bulbul. Some authorities continue to consider the two species as conspecific. Alternate names for the montane tiny greenbul include the green-crowned greenbul, Usambara bulbul and Usambara greenbul.
