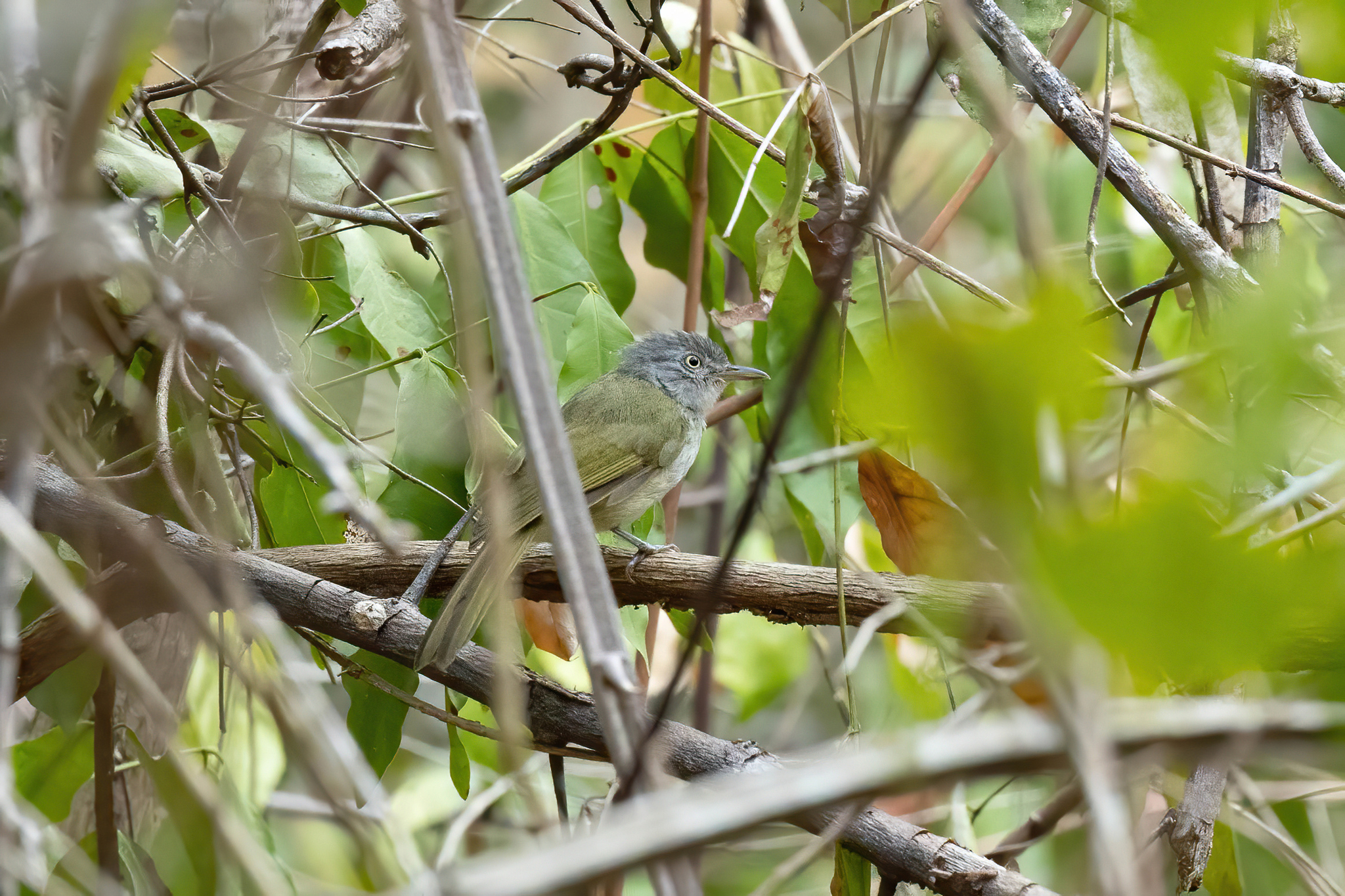

Conservation status
- Least Concern (IUCN 3.1)

Scientific classification
- Kingdom: Animalia
- Phylum: Chordata
- Class: Aves
- Order: Passeriformes
- Family: Pycnonotidae
- Genus: Phyllastrephus
- Species: P. debilis

Binomial name
- Phyllastrephus debilis (Sclater, WL, 1899)
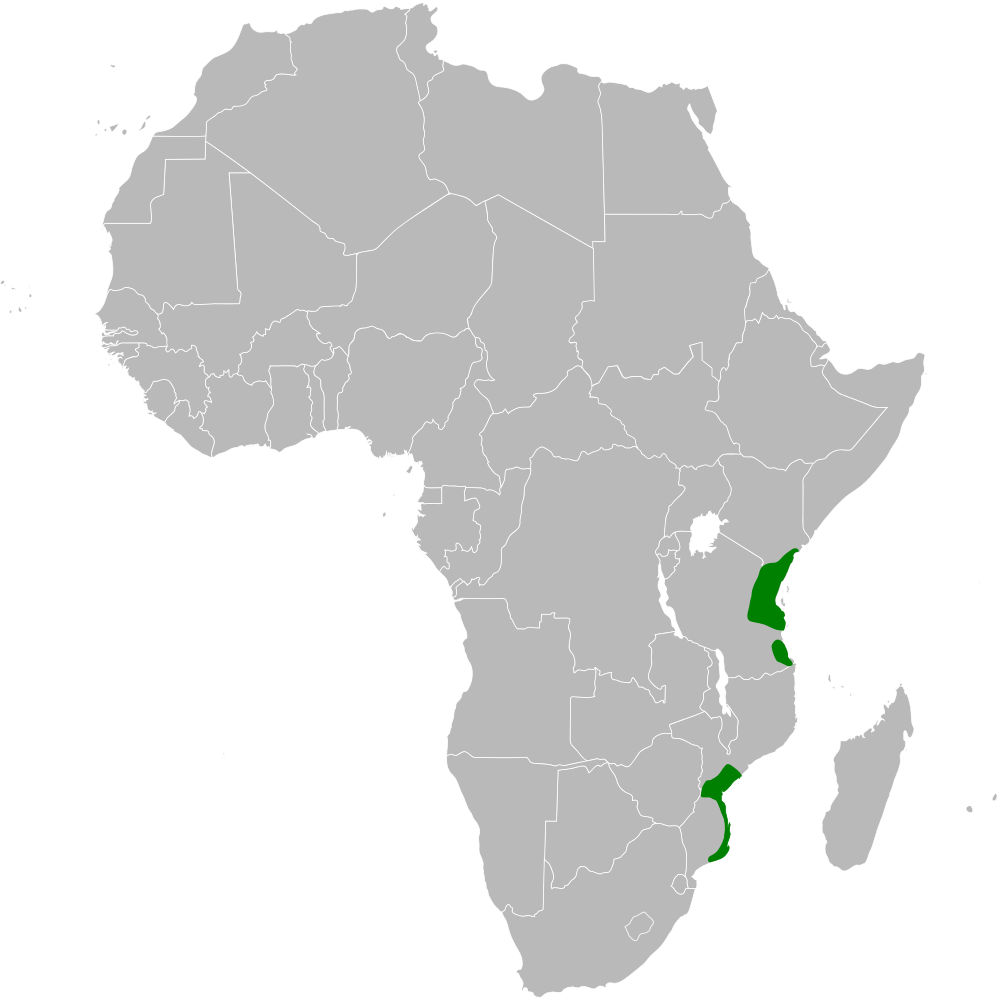

Synonyms
- Phyllastrephus rabai; Xenocichla debilis

= Lowland tiny greenbul =

Lowland Tiny Greenbul

Species of songbird

The lowland tiny greenbul (Phyllastrephus debilis), is a species of songbird in the bulbul family, Pycnonotidae. It is found in eastern Africa. Its natural habitats are subtropical or tropical moist lowland forest and subtropical or tropical moist shrubland.

== Taxonomy and systematics ==
The lowland tiny greenbul was originally described in the genus Xenocichla (a synonym for Bleda). Until 2009, the montane tiny greenbul was considered as conspecific with the lowland tiny greenbul as the tiny bulbul. Some authorities continue to consider the two species as conspecific.

=== Subspecies ===
Two subspecies are recognized:

- Rabai yellow-streaked bulbul (P. d. rabai) - Hartert & van Someren, 1921: Found in south-eastern Kenya and north-eastern Tanzania
- North Nyasa yellow-streaked bulbul (P. d. debilis) - (Sclater, WL, 1899): Also named the smaller yellow-streaked bulbul. Found in south-eastern Tanzania to eastern Zimbabwe and southern Mozambique
