= Old World warbler =

Group of birds

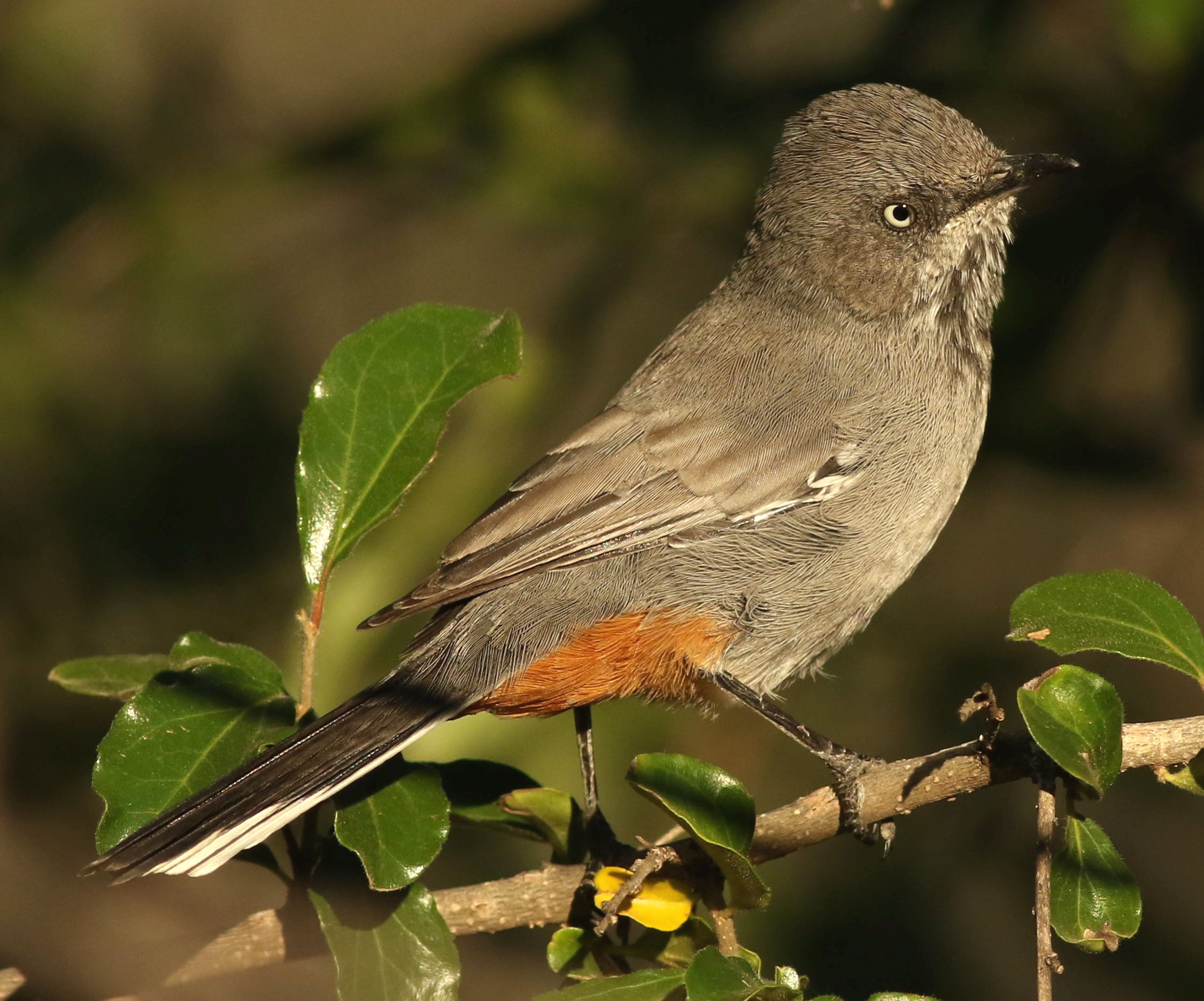
Chestnut-vented warbler (Curruca subcoerulea) in South Africa

Banded parisoma (Curruca boehmi),
song recorded in Kenya

The Old World warblers are a large group of birds formerly grouped together in the bird family Sylviidae. They are not closely related to the New World warblers. The family held over 400 species in over 70 genera, and were the source of much taxonomic confusion. Two families were split out initially, the cisticolas into Cisticolidae and the kinglets into Regulidae. In the past 20–30 years they have been the subject of much research and many species are now placed into other families, including the Acrocephalidae, Cettiidae, Phylloscopidae, and Megaluridae. In addition some species have been moved into existing families or have not yet had their placement fully resolved. Only a small number of warblers, in just two genera, are now retained in the family Sylviidae.

== Characteristics ==
Most Old World warblers are of generally undistinguished appearance, though some species are boldly marked. The sexes are often identical, but may be clearly distinct, notably in the genera Sylvia and Curruca. They are of small to medium size, varying from 9 to 20 centimetres in length, with a slender, finely pointed bill. Almost all species are primarily insectivorous, although many will also eat soft fruit, nectar, or tiny seeds.

The majority of species are monogamous and build simple, cup-shaped nests in dense vegetation. They lay between two and six eggs per clutch, depending on species. Both parents typically help in raising the young, which are able to fly at around two weeks of age.

== Systematics ==
In the late 20th century, the Sylviidae were thought to unite nearly 300 small insectivorous bird species in nearly 50 genera, a huge family, with few clear patterns of relationships recognisable. Though not as diverse as the Timaliidae (Old World babblers; another "wastebin taxon" containing more thrush-like forms), the frontiers were much blurred. The largely tropical warbler family Cisticolidae was at that time traditionally included in the Sylviidae. The kinglets, now a small genus in a monotypic family Regulidae, were also sometimes placed in this family, including by the influential List of Recent Holarctic Bird Species. The American Ornithologists' Union then also included the gnatcatchers, as subfamily Polioptilinae, in the Sylviidae.

Sibley & Ahlquist (1990) united the "Old World warblers" with the babblers and other taxa in a superfamily Sylvioidea as a result of DNA–DNA hybridisation studies. This demonstrated that the Sylviidae as initially defined was a form taxon which collected unrelated songbirds. Consequently, the monophyly of the individual "songster" lineages themselves was increasingly being questioned.

More recently, analysis of DNA sequence data has provided information on the Sylvioidea. Usually, the scope of the clade was underestimated and only one or two specimens were sampled for each presumed "family". Minor or little-known groups such as the parrotbills were left out entirely (e.g. Ericson & Johansson 2003, Barker et al. 2004). These could only confirm that the Cisticolidae were indeed distinct, and suggested that bulbuls (Pycnonotidae) were apparently the closest relatives of a group containing Sylviidae, Timaliidae, cisticolids and white-eyes.

In 2003, a study of Timaliidae relationships (Cibois 2003a) using mtDNA cytochrome b and 12S/16S rRNA data indicated that the Sylviidae and Old World babblers were not reciprocally monophyletic to each other. Moreover, Sylvia, the type genus of the Sylviidae, turned out to be closer to taxa such as the yellow-eyed babbler (Chrysomma sinense, traditionally held to be an atypical timaliid) and the wrentit (Chamaea fasciata), an enigmatic species generally held to be the only American Old World babbler. The parrotbills Paradoxornithidae (roughly, "puzzling birds") of then unclear affiliations also were part of what apparently was a well distinctive clade.

Cibois suggested that the Sylviidae should officially be suppressed by the ICZN as a taxon and the genus Sylvia merged into the Timaliidae (Cibois 2003b), but this was rejected. Clearly, the sheer extent of the groups concerned made it necessary to study a wide range of taxa. This was begun by Beresford et al. (2005) and Alström et al. (2006). They determined that the late-20th-century Sylviidae united at least four, but probably as many as seven major distinct lineages. The authors propose the creation of several new families (Phylloscopidae, Cettiidae, Acrocephalidae, and Megaluridae, this last turning out to be a synonym of the older-published Locustellidae) to better reflect the evolutionary history of the sylvioid group.

== Species ==
=== Family Sylviidae sensu stricto ===
Typical warblers (or sylviid warblers). A fairly diverse group of smallish taxa with longish tails, now containing 33 species in two genera. Mostly in Europe and the Mediterranean region, with a few extending to central Asia and in tropical Africa.

- Genus Sylvia – typical warblers (6 species)
  - Eurasian blackcap, Sylvia atricapilla
  - Garden warbler, Sylvia borin
  - Dohrn's warbler, Sylvia dohrni
  - Abyssinian catbird, Sylvia galinieri
  - Bush blackcap, Sylvia nigricapillus
  - African hill babbler, Sylvia abyssinica
- Genus Curruca – 27 species. Formerly in Sylvia (Sylviidae)
  - Barred warbler, Curruca nisoria
  - Layard's warbler, Curruca layardi
  - Banded parisoma, Curruca boehmi
  - Chestnut-vented warbler, Curruca suboerulea
  - Desert whitethroat, Curruca minula
  - Lesser whitethroat, Curruca curruca
  - Hume's whitethroat, Curruca althaea
  - Brown parisoma, Curruca lugens
  - Yemen warbler, Curruca buryi
  - Arabian warbler, Curruca leucomelaena
  - Western orphean warbler, Curruca hortensis
  - Eastern orphean warbler, Curruca crassirostris
  - African desert warbler, Curruca deserti
  - Asian desert warbler, Curruca nana
  - Tristram's warbler, Curruca deserticola
  - Menetries's warbler, Curruca mystacea
  - Rüppell's warbler, Curruca ruppeli
  - Cyprus warbler, Curruca melanothorax
  - Sardinian warbler, Curruca melanocephala
  - Western subalpine warbler, Curruca iberiae
  - Moltoni's warbler, Curruca subalpina
  - Eastern subalpine warbler, Curruca cantillans
  - Common whitethroat, Curruca communis
  - Spectacled warbler, Curruca conspicillata
  - Marmora's warbler, Curruca sarda
  - Dartford warbler, Curruca undata
  - Balearic warbler, Curruca balearica

=== Moved to family Paradoxornithidae ===
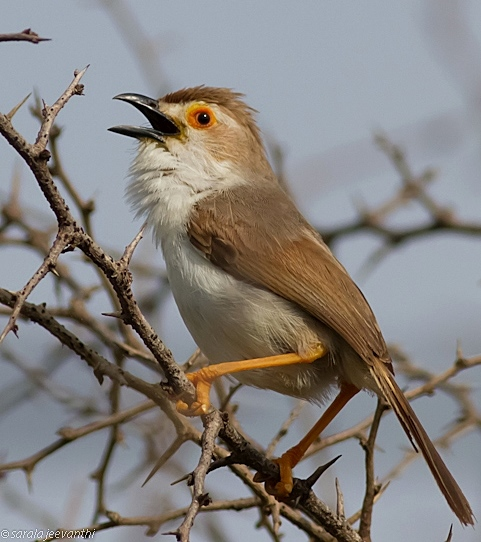
Chrysomma sinense, the yellow-eyed babbler, used to be considered a sylviid closely related to parrotbills.

- Genus Lioparus – golden-breasted fulvetta
- Genus Chrysomma
  - Yellow-eyed babbler, Chrysomma sinense
  - Jerdon's babbler, Chrysomma altirostre
- Genus Rhopophilus
  - Tarim babbler, Rhopophilus albosuperciliaris
  - Beijing babbler, Rhopophilus pekinensis
- Genus Fulvetta
  - Spectacled fulvetta, Fulvetta ruficapilla
  - Indochinese fulvetta, Fulvetta danisi
  - Chinese fulvetta, Fulvetta striaticollis
  - White-browed fulvetta, Fulvetta vinipectus
  - Brown-throated fulvetta, Fulvetta ludlowi
  - Manipur fulvetta, Fulvetta manipurensis
  - Grey-hooded fulvetta, Fulvetta cinereiceps
- Genus Chamea – wrentit
- Genus Paradoxornis
  - Black-breasted parrotbill, Paradoxornis flavirostris
  - Spot-breasted parrotbill, Paradoxornis guttaticollis
- Genus Conostoma – great parrotbill

=== Moved to family Pellorneidae ===
- Genus Graminicola
  - Rufous-rumped grassbird ("-babbler") Graminicola bengalensis

=== Moved to family Cisticolidae ===
- Genus Bathmocercus – rufous-warblers
  - Black-capped rufous-warbler, Bathmocercus cerviniventris
  - Black-faced rufous-warbler, Bathmocercus rufus
- Genus Sceptomycter – sometimes merged into Bathmocercus
  - Mrs Moreau's warbler, Sceptomycter winifredae
- Genus Poliolais – Cisticolidae or more basal like bulbuls?
  - White-tailed warbler, Poliolais lopezi
- Two to 14 of the 15 tailorbirds

=== Moved to family Acrocephalidae ===
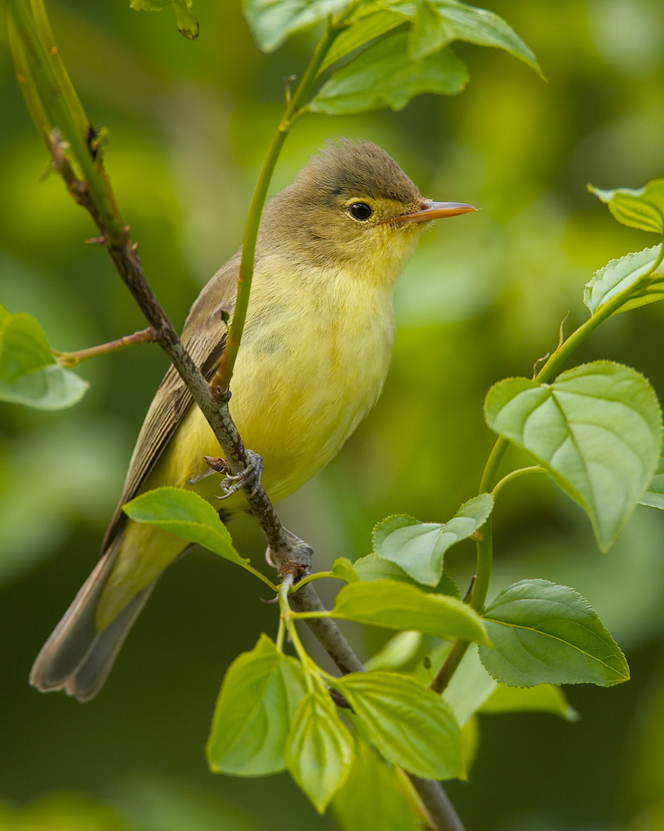
Icterine warbler (Hippolais icterina) in Germany

Marsh and tree warblers or acrocephalid warblers. Usually rather large "warblers", most are olivaceous brown above with much yellow to beige below. Usually in open woodland, reed beds or tall grass. Mainly southern Asia to western Europe and surroundings ranging far into Pacific, some in Africa.

- Genus Graueria – one species, Grauer's warbler
- Genus Acrocephalus – marsh warblers (about 38 living species, 5 recently extinct)
- Genus Iduna – olivaceous warblers (6 species)
- Genus Hippolais – tree warblers (4 species)
- Genus Arundinax – one species, thick-billed warbler
- Genus Calamonastides – yellow warblers (2 species)
- Genus Nesillas – brush warblers (5 living species, 1 recently extinct)

=== Moved to Malagasy warblers ===
See Cibois et al. (2001)

- Genus Thamnornis
  - Thamnornis, Thamnornis chloropetoides
- Genus Cryptosylvicola
  - Cryptic warbler, Cryptosylvicola randriansoloi

=== Moved to family Locustellidae ===
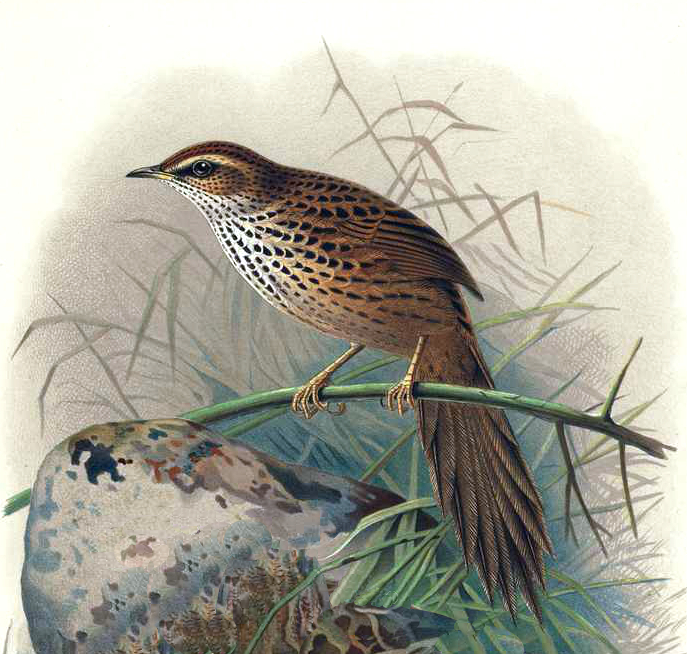
New Zealand's fernbird – probably belongs to the Locustellidae

Grass warblers and allies. Mid-sized and usually long-tailed species; sometimes strongly patterned but generally very drab in overall colouration. Often forage in dense low vegetation. Old World and into Australian region, centred on the Indian Ocean.

- Genus Bradypterus – megalurid warblers (12 species, including the former genus Dromaeocercus)
- Genus Locustella – grass warblers (more than 20 species)
- Genus Megalurus – typical grassbirds (10 species)
- Genus Amphilais – grey emutail
- Genus Elaphrornis – Sri Lanka bush warbler
- Genus Schoenicola – (2 species)
- Genus Buettikoferella – buff-banded thicketbird
- Genus Chaetornis – bristled grassbird

=== Moved to family Donacobiidae ===
The black-capped donacobius Donacobius atricapillus, which was long considered an aberrant wren or mockingbird is apparently quite closely related, and is the only South American species in the superfamily Sylvioidea.

=== Moved to family Cettiidae ===
Typical bush warblers and relatives or cettiid warblers. Another group of generally very drab species, tend to be smaller and shorter-tailed than Megaluridae. Usually frequent shrubland and undergrowth. Continental Asia, and surrounding regions, ranging into Africa and southern Europe.

- Genus Pholidornis – formerly in Remizidae; tentatively placed here
  - Tit hylia, Pholidornis rushiae
- Genus Hylia – tentatively placed here
  - Green hylia, Hylia prasina
- Genus Abroscopus – Abroscopus warblers
  - Rufous-faced warbler, Abroscopus albogularis
  - Yellow-bellied warbler, Abroscopus superciliaris
  - Black-faced warbler, Abroscopus schisticeps

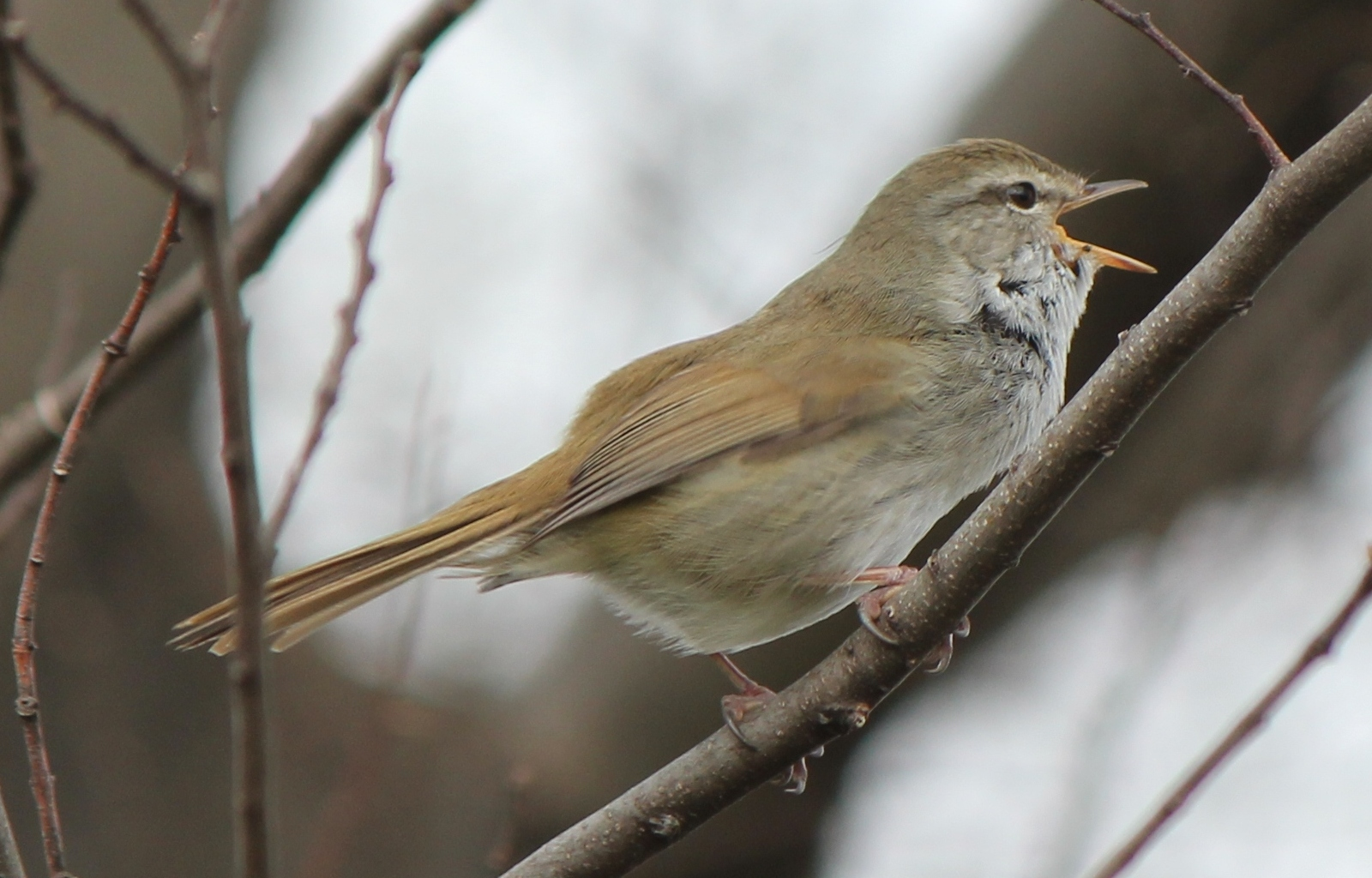
Uguisu (鶯), the Japanese bush warbler (Horornis diphone). See also uguisubari.

- Genus Erythrocercus – monarch-warblers. Formerly Monarchinae.
  - Chestnut-capped flycatcher, Erythrocercus mccallii
  - Little yellow flycatcher, Erythrocercus holochlorus
  - Livingstone's flycatcher, Erythrocercus livingstonei
- Genus Urosphena – stubtails
  - Timor stubtail, Urosphena subulata
    - Babar stubtail, Urosphena subulata advena – extinct (mid-20th century)
  - Bornean stubtail, Urosphena whiteheadi
  - Asian stubtail, Urosphena squameiceps
  - Pale-footed bush warbler, Urosphena pallidipes
  - Neumann's warbler, Urosphena neumanni
- Genus Tesia – tesias
  - Javan tesia, tesia superciliaris
  - Slaty-bellied tesia, Tesia olivea
  - Grey-bellied tesia, Tesia cyaniventer
  - Russet-capped tesia, Tesia everetti
- Genus Horornis – bush warblers (some 13 species).
- Genus Cettia – bush warblers (4 species).
- Genus Tickellia
  - Broad-billed warbler, Tickellia hodgsoni
- Genus Phyllergates
  - Mountain tailorbird, Phyllergates cucullatus
  - Rufous-headed tailorbird, Phyllergates heterolaemus

=== Moved to family Aegithalidae ===
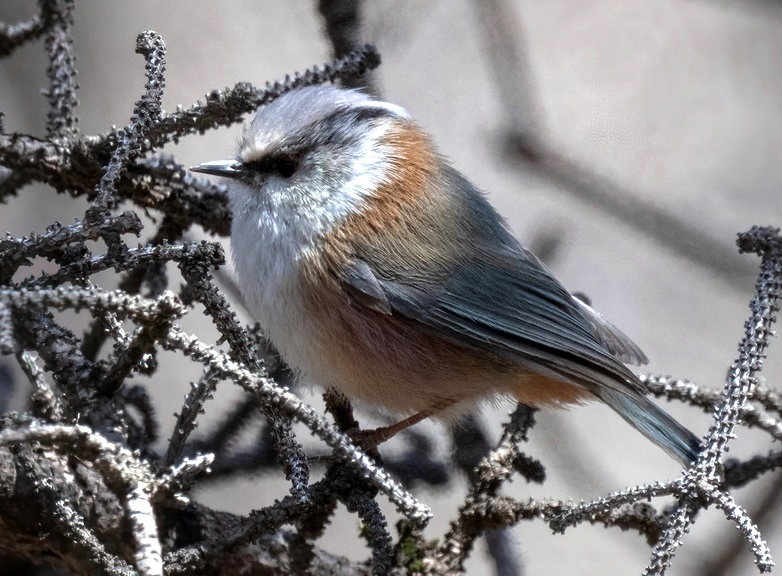
Crested tit-warbler (Leptopoecile elegans) in China

- Genus Leptopoecile – tit-warblers.
  - White-browed tit-warbler, Leptopoecile sophiae
  - Crested tit-warbler, Leptopoecile elegans

=== Moved to family Phylloscopidae ===
Leaf warblers. A group variable in size, generally dull to vivid green above and whitish or yellow below, or more subdued with greyish-green to greyish-brown plumage. Catch food on the wing fairly often. Eurasia, ranging into Wallacea and Africa.

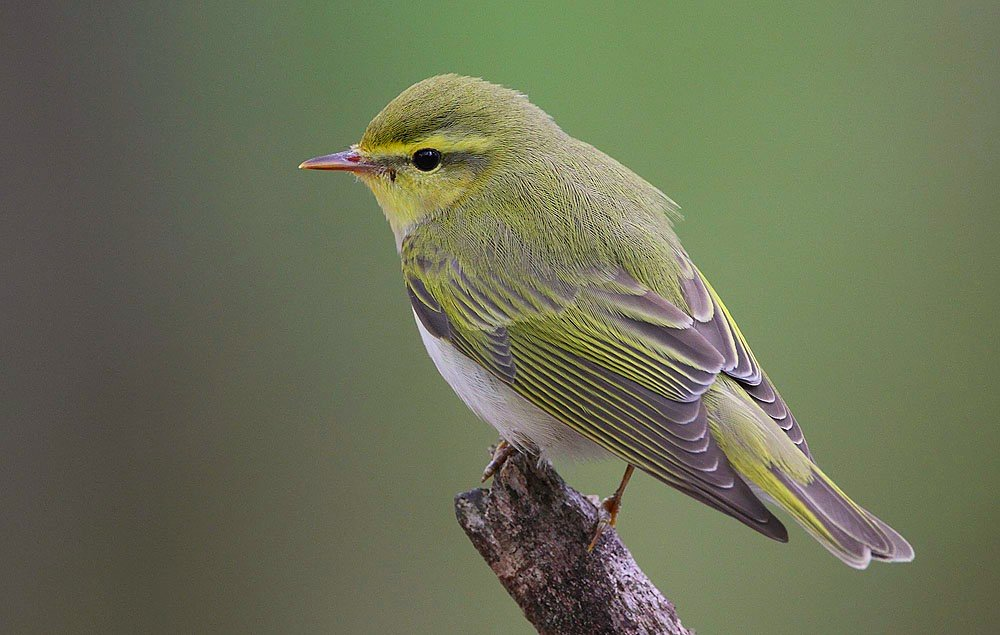
Wood warbler (Phylloscopus sibilatrix) in Scotland

- Genus Phylloscopus – leaf warblers (c. 55 species). Includes the former genus Seicercus.
  - Green-crowned warbler, Phylloscopus burkii
  - Grey-crowned warbler, Phylloscopus tephrocephalus
  - Whistler's warbler, Phylloscopus whistleri
  - Bianchi's warbler, Phylloscopus valentini
  - Martens's warbler, Phylloscopus omeiensis
  - Alström's warbler, Phylloscopus soror
  - White-spectacled warbler, Phylloscopus affinis – paraphyletic
    - Bar-winged white-spectacled warbler, Phylloscopus (affinis) intermedius
  - Grey-cheeked warbler, Phylloscopus poliogenys
  - Chestnut-crowned warbler, Phylloscopus castaniceps
  - Yellow-breasted warbler, Phylloscopus montis
  - Sunda warbler, Phylloscopus grammiceps

=== Moved to family Macrosphenidae ===
African warblers. Also "Sphenoeacus group". An assemblage of usually species-poor and apparently rather ancient "odd warblers" from Africa. Ecomorphologically quite variable. Monophyly requires confirmation.

- Genus Sylvietta – crombecs

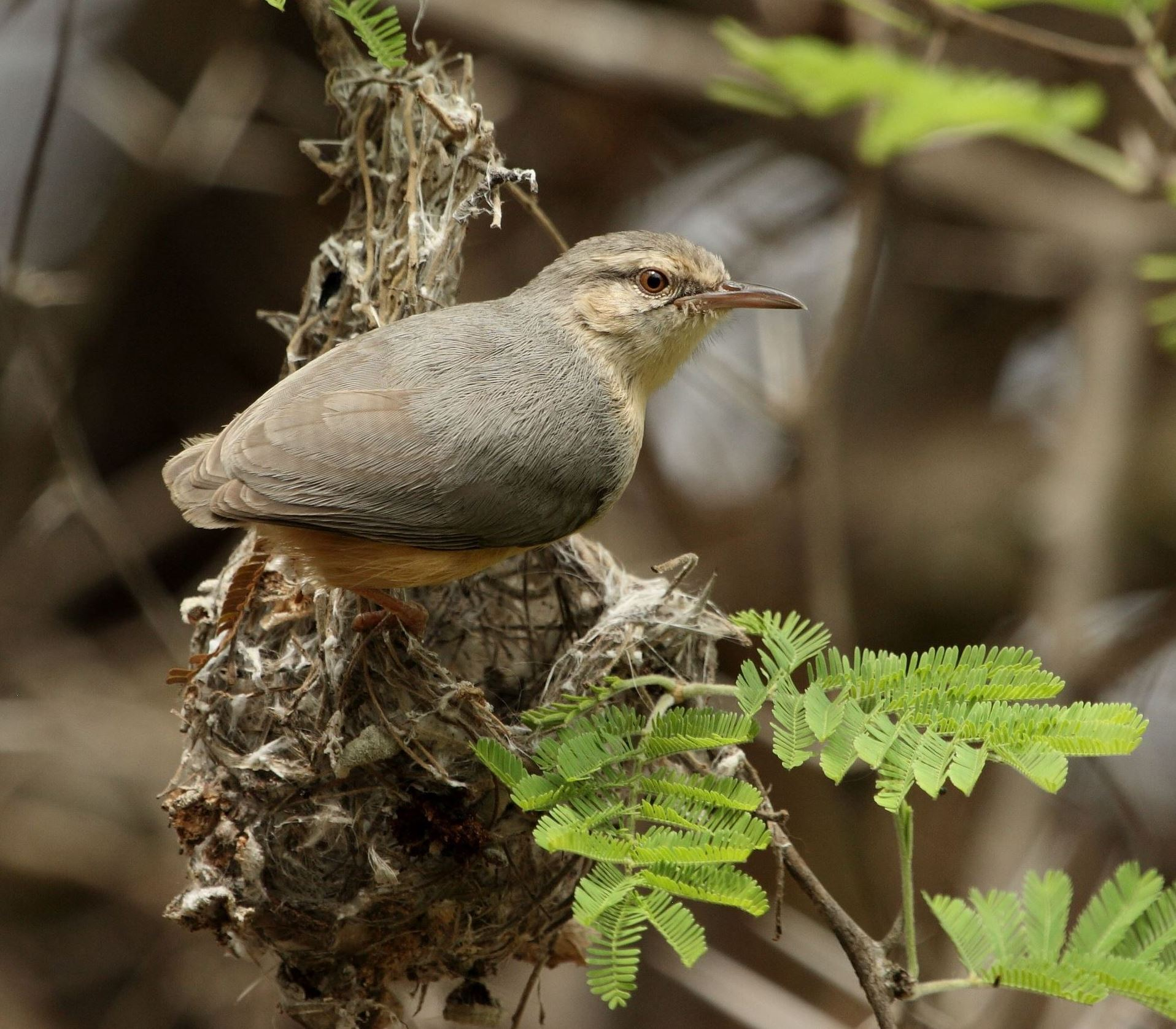
Long-billed crombec (Sylvietta rufescens) in South Africa

  - Green crombec, Sylvietta virens
  - Lemon-bellied crombec, Sylvietta denti
  - White-browed crombec, Sylvietta leucophrys
    - Chapin's crombec, Sylvietta (leucophrys) chapini – possibly extinct (late 20th century?)
  - Northern crombec, Sylvietta brachyura
  - Philippa's crombec, Sylvietta philippae
  - Red-capped crombec, Sylvietta ruficapilla
  - Red-faced crombec, Sylvietta whytii
  - Somali crombec, Sylvietta isabellina
  - Long-billed crombec, Sylvietta rufescens
- Genus Melocichla
  - Moustached grass warbler, Melocichla mentalis
- Genus Achaetops
  - Rockrunner, Achaetops pycnopygius
- Genus Sphenoeacus
  - Cape grassbird, Sphenoeacus afer
- Genus Cryptillas.
  - Victorin's warbler, Cryptillas victorini
- Genus Macrosphenus – longbills
  - Kemp's longbill, Macrosphenus kempi
  - Yellow longbill, Macrosphenus flavicans
  - Grey longbill, Macrosphenus concolor
  - Pulitzer's longbill, Macrosphenus pulitzeri
  - Kretschmer's longbill, Macrosphenus kretschmeri

=== "Sylviidae" incertae sedis ===
Taxa that have not been studied. Most are likely to belong to one of Sylvioidea families listed above. Those in the Australian-Pacific region are probably Megaluridae. These taxa are listed in the sequence used in recent years.

- Genus Phyllolais – Cisticolidae?
  - Buff-bellied warbler, Phyllolais pulchella
- Genus Eremomela – eremomelas. Cettiidae?
  - Salvadori's eremomela, Eremomela salvadorii
  - Yellow-vented eremomela, Eremomela flavicrissalis
  - Yellow-bellied eremomela, Eremomela icteropygialis
  - Senegal eremomela, Eremomela canescens
  - Green-backed eremomela, Eremomela pusilla
  - Green-capped eremomela, Eremomela scotops
  - Yellow-rumped eremomela, Eremomela gregalis
  - Rufous-crowned eremomela, Eremomela badiceps
  - Turner's eremomela, Eremomela turneri
    - Western Turner's eremomela, Eremomela turneri kalindei – probably extinct (early 1980s?)
  - Black-necked eremomela, Eremomela atricollis
  - Burnt-neck eremomela, Eremomela usticollis
- Genus Randia – Malagasy warblers?
  - Rand's warbler, Randia pseudozosterops
- Genus Bowdleria – fernbirds. Sometimes merged into Megalurus. Locustellidae?
  - Fernbird, Bowdleria punctata
  - Chatham fernbird, Bowdleria rufescens – extinct (c. 1900)
- Genus Chaetornis – bristled grassbird. Locustellidae?
- Genus Schoenicola – grassbirds. Basal Locustellidae?
  - Broad-tailed grassbird, Schoenicola platyura
  - Fan-tailed grassbird, Schoenicola brevirostris
- Genus Cincloramphus – songlarks. Basal Locustellidae?
  - Brown songlark, Cincloramphus cruralis
  - Rufous songlark, Cincloramphus mathewsi
- Genus Buettikoferella – probably Locustellidae
  - Buff-banded bushbird, Buettikoferella bivittata
- Genus Megalurulus – thicketbirds. Probably Locustellidae
  - New Caledonian grassbird, Megalurulus mariei
  - Bismarck thicketbird, Megalurulus grosvenori
  - Bougainville thicketbird, Megalurulus llaneae
  - Santo thicketbird, Megalurulus whitneyi
  - Rusty thicketbird, Megalurulus rubiginosus
- Genus Trichocichla – long-legged warbler

=== Not in Sylvioidea ===
Entirely unrelated songbirds hitherto placed in Sylviidae

- Genus Amaurocichla – Now placed in Passeroidea in the Motacillidae
  - Bocage's longbill or São Tomé short-tail, Amaurocichla bocagei
- Genus Stenostira – Together with some "odd flycatchers", they form the new family Stenostiridae. They are closely related to Paridae (Beresford et al. 2005)
  - Fairy flycatcher, Stenostira scita
- Genus Hyliota – hyliotas. Basal Passerida with no known relatives, perhaps somewhat closer to Promeropidae (sugarbirds)
  - Yellow-bellied hyliota, Hyliota flavigaster
  - Southern hyliota, Hyliota australis
  - Usambara hyliota, Hyliota usambarae
  - Violet-backed hyliota, Hyliota violacea
- Genus Newtonia – newtonias. Now in Vangidae (vangas); possibly polyphyletic (Yamagishi et al. 2001)
  - Dark newtonia, Newtonia amphichroa
  - Common newtonia, Newtonia brunneicauda
  - Archbold's newtonia, Newtonia archboldi
  - Red-tailed newtonia, Newtonia fanovanae – tentatively placed here

== See also ==
- List of extinct birds
