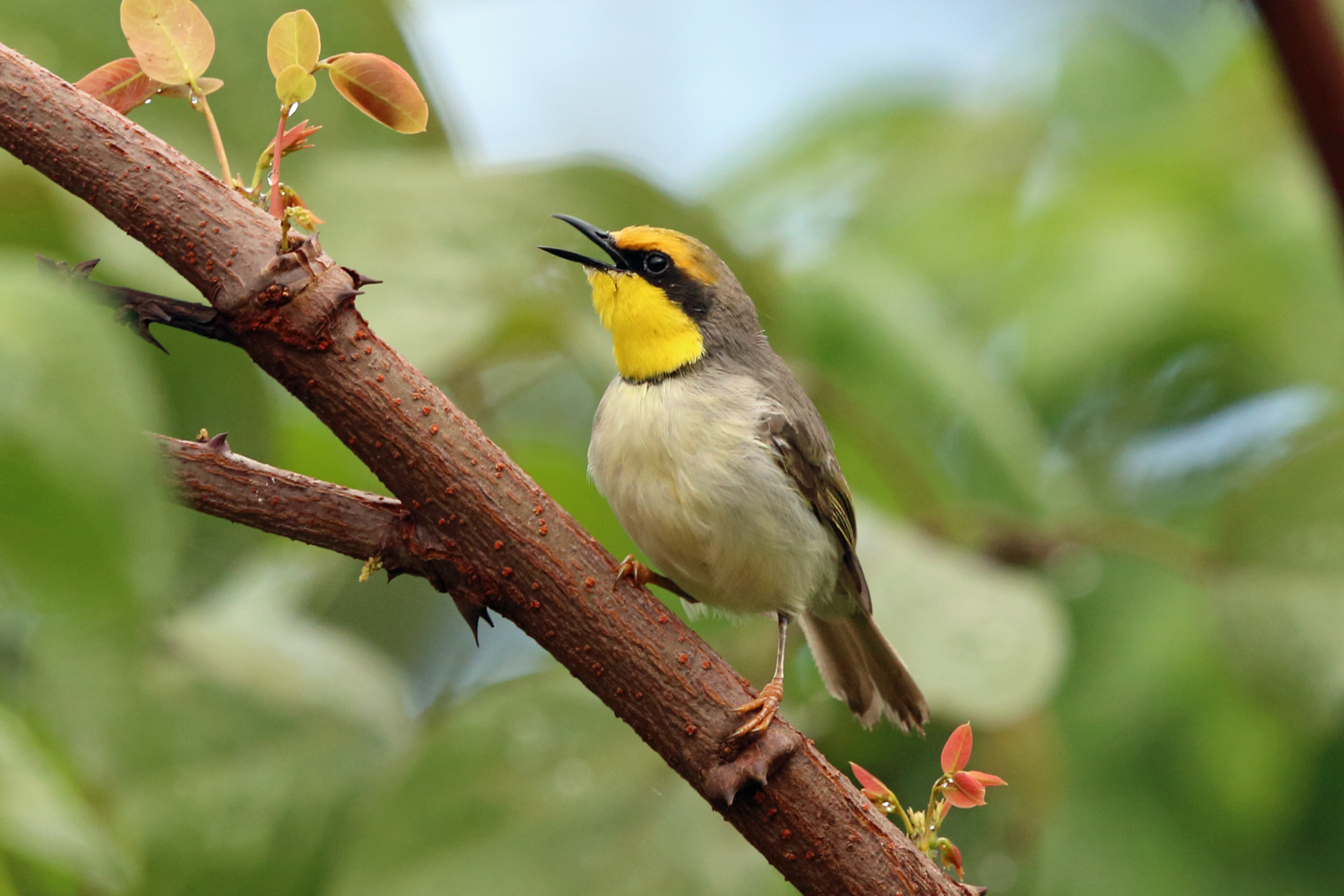
- Black-necked eremomela (Eremomela atricollis) in Sakania, DR Congo

Scientific classification
- Kingdom: Animalia
- Phylum: Chordata
- Class: Aves
- Order: Passeriformes
- Family: Cisticolidae
- Genus: Eremomela; Sundevall, 1850

Type species
- Sylvia flaviventris Burchell, 1822

= Eremomela =

Genus of birds

The eremomelas are a genus, Eremomela, of passerines in the cisticola family Cisticolidae. The genus was previously placed with the larger Old World warbler family Sylviidae prior to that genus being broken up into several families. The genus contains eleven species, all of which are found in sub-Saharan Africa. They occupy a range of habitats, from arid scrub to lowland tropical forest. They are intermediate in appearance between crombecs and apalis, and measure between 8.5 to 12 cm (3.3–4.7 in) in length. The sexes are alike in size and plumage.

== Taxonomy ==
The genus was erected by the Swedish zoologist Carl Jakob Sundevall in 1850. The type species is the yellow-bellied eremomela (Eremomela icteropygialis). The genus name Eremomela comes from Ancient Greek ἐρῆμος (erêmos), meaning "desert", and μέλος (mélos), meaning "song, melody".

== Species ==
The genus contains 10 species:

Image	Common name	Scientific name	Distribution
	Yellow-bellied eremomela	Eremomela icteropygialis	Africa south of the Sahara
	Yellow-vented eremomela	Eremomela flavicrissalis	Ethiopia, Kenya, Somalia, Tanzania, and Uganda.
	Senegal eremomela	Eremomela pusilla	southern Mauritania and Senegal to north western Cameroon, south-western Chad and far north-western Central African Republic
	Green-backed eremomela	Eremomela canescens	Kenya and Ethiopia to Cameroon.
	Green-capped eremomela	Eremomela scotops	Angola, Botswana, Burundi, Republic of the Congo, DRC, Gabon, Kenya, Malawi, Mozambique, Namibia, Rwanda, South Africa, Swaziland, Tanzania, Uganda, Zambia, and Zimbabwe
	Karoo eremomela	Eremomela gregalis	Namibia and South Africa.
	Burnt-necked eremomela	Eremomela usticollis	Angola, Botswana, Eswatini, Malawi, Mozambique, Namibia, South Africa, Zambia, and Zimbabwe.
	Rufous-crowned eremomela	Eremomela badiceps	African tropical rainforest.
	Turner's eremomela	Eremomela turneri	Democratic Republic of the Congo, Kenya and Uganda.
	Black-necked eremomela	Eremomela atricollis	Angola, Democratic Republic of the Congo, and Zambia.
