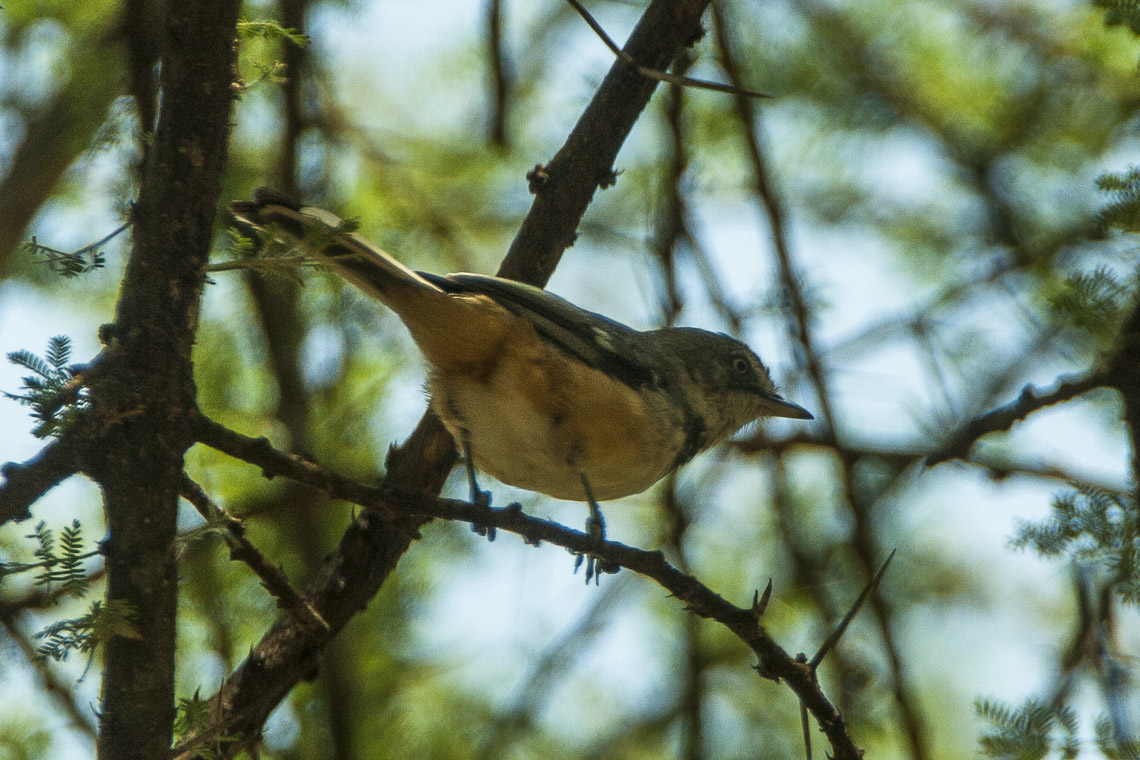
- Near Lake Manyara, Tanzania

Conservation status
- Least Concern (IUCN 3.1)

Scientific classification
- Kingdom: Animalia
- Phylum: Chordata
- Class: Aves
- Order: Passeriformes
- Family: Sylviidae
- Genus: Curruca
- Species: C. boehmi

Binomial name
- Curruca boehmi (Reichenow, 1882)

Synonyms
- Parisoma boehmi; Sylvia boehmi

Audio
- Song recorded in southwestern Kenya

= Banded parisoma =

Species of bird

The banded parisoma (Curruca boehmi), banded tit warbler or banded warbler, is a species of Old World warbler in the family Sylviidae. It is found in Ethiopia, Kenya, Somalia, and Tanzania. Its natural habitat is dry savanna.

Measuring 4.75 in (12.1 cm) in length, this bird is identified as gray on top, white below, with a dark chest band. The bird has variable spotting on the throat, white patches on his wing and outer tail, and buff coloring on the belly and undertail.

== Subspecies ==
Three subspecies are recognised:

- Curruca boehmi somalica (Friedmann, 1928) – Ethiopia, northwest Somalia and northeast Kenya
- Curruca boehmi marsabit (Van Someren, 1931) – central north Kenya
- Curruca boehmi boehmi (Reichenow, 1882) – south Kenya and Tanzania
