= Turner's eremomela =

Conservation status
- Near Threatened (IUCN 3.1)

Scientific classification
- Kingdom: Animalia
- Phylum: Chordata
- Class: Aves
- Order: Passeriformes
- Family: Cisticolidae
- Genus: Eremomela
- Species: E. turneri

Binomial name
- Eremomela turneri Van Someren, 1920
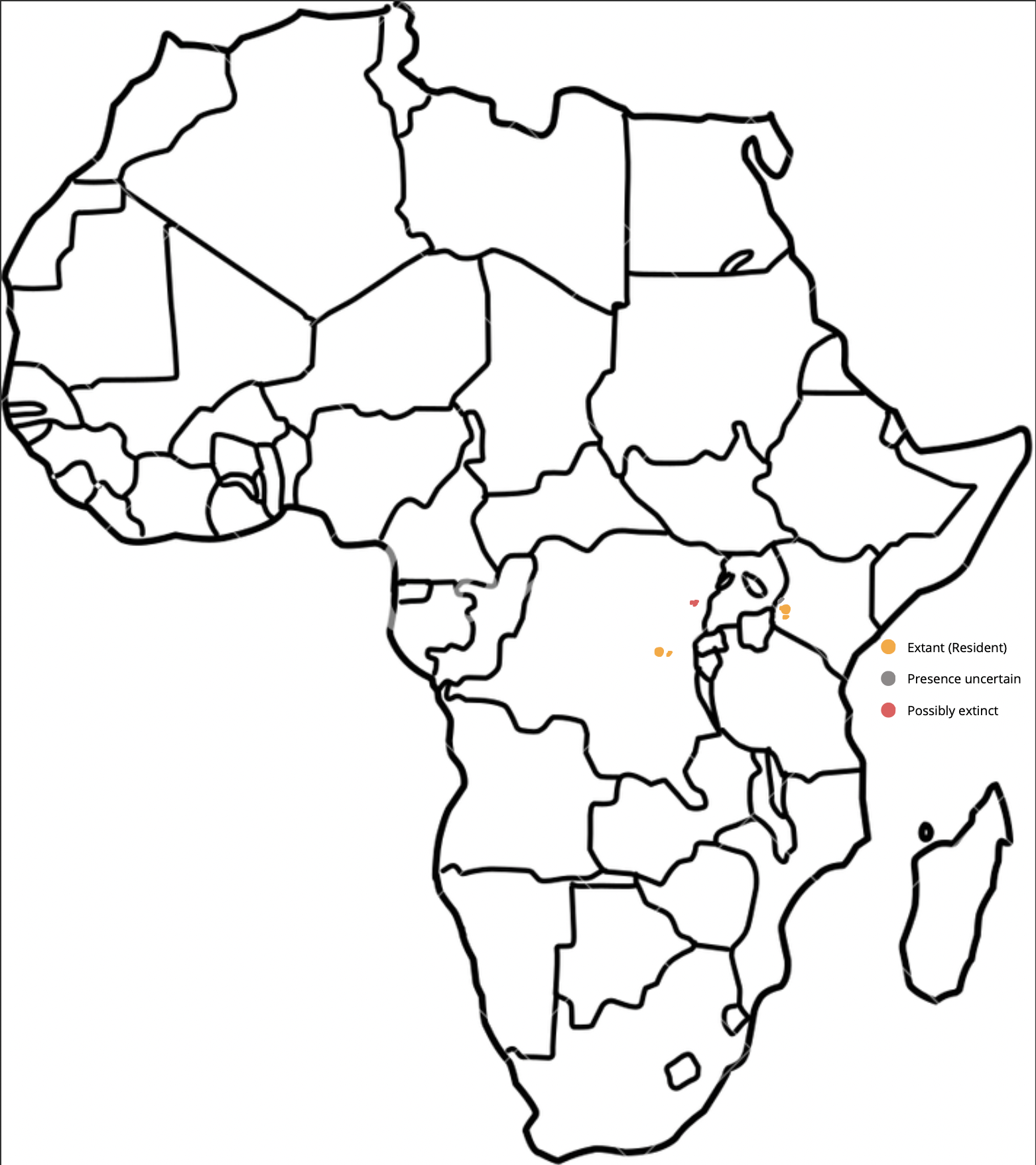

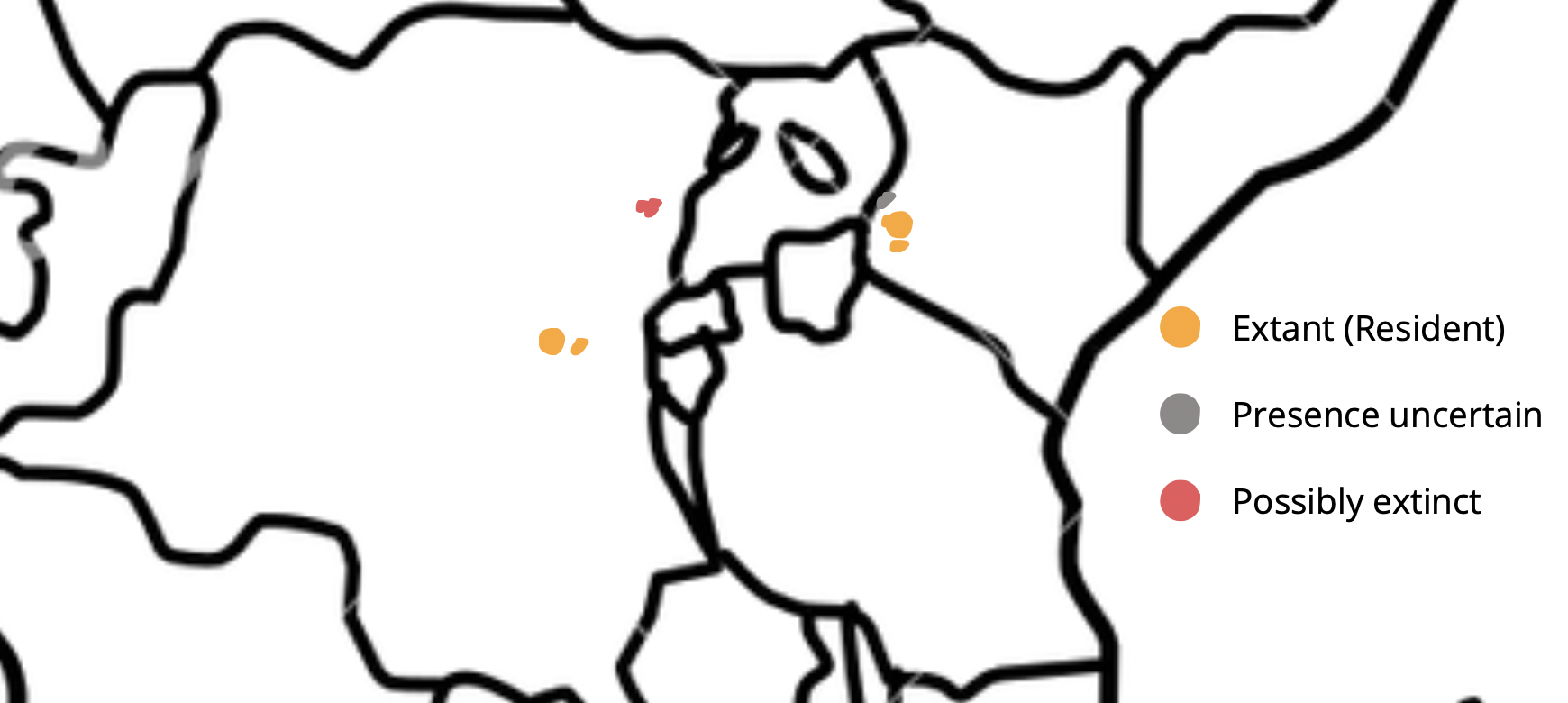

Species of bird

Turner's eremomela (Eremomela turneri) is a species of bird formerly placed since 1990 in the "Old World warbler" (Sylviidae) assemblage. It was definitely placed in the family Cisticolidae in 2008 after multiple genetic analyses.

It is found in the Democratic Republic of the Congo, Kenya, and Uganda. Its natural habitats are subtropical or tropical moist lowland forests and subtropical or tropical moist montane forests. It is threatened by habitat loss.

== Description ==
Turner's eremomela is a small, discreet bird being only 9 centimetres long and weighing 6 to 9 grams. It does not exhibit a sexual dimorphism. All adults have pale grey underparts, the rear of the head, and the back. The upper wings are slightly darker grey. They are easily distinguishable by a bright rufous forehead which extends to the top of the head. Under their dark eye streak, they have a white throat and a darker band right underneath. Unlike the adults, juveniles are a duller olive-brown above and pale yellow below. They also do not have the rufous forehead or the throatband.

This species is very similar to the Rufous-crowned Eremomela. Turner's eremomela is smaller overall and has less rufous present on the head.

== Taxonomy ==
Turner's eremomela was first officially described by Van Someren in 1920, along with many other new African birds. This species is now a member of the family Cisticolidae. It was once considered part of the rufous-crowned eremomela species, but was recognized as a separate species when areas of overlap between the two were discovered in the Congo Rainforest. Depending on the assessement technique used, it is still debated whether the closer sister genus is Prinia or Apalis, both also originally classified in the "Old world Warbler" assemblage.

=== Regional Variation ===
Two subspecies are currently recognized.

Eremomela turneri subspecies
Subspecies	Authority	Distribution
E. t. turneri	van Someren, 1920	Central Kenya (Kakamega and Nandi Forests)
E. t. kalindei	Prigogine, 1958	Central-Eastern Democratic Republic of the Congo; one old specimen presumed to be this race from far western Uganda

The nominate E. t. turneri is named for Henry John Allen Turner, a settler in Kenya of British origin. The western E. t. kalindei is named for Kalinde Musiko, a Congolese hunter who collected birds on behalf of Alexandre Prigogine and Musée du Congo belge.

== Distribution and habitat ==
Found in several small patches of Central and East Africa, Turner's eremomela's distribution is quite patchy and not very well known. It is estimated they occupy only about 1 400 km2 in 11 to 20 distinct locations, over a total extent of 39,100 km2. In Kenya they are currently present in Kakamega and Nandi Forests, with the type specimen for this species collected in the Yala River, in western Kenya. This species is also found in the south-eastern corner of the equatorial forest belt in Central-Eastern Democratic Republic of Congo. It is a native species to all these regions and has not been introduced or is considered invasive anywhere.

It is a sedentary species; it does not migrate between areas with the seasons. Therefore, it heavily relies on its current distribution and habitat for survival. However, its area of occupancy is continually declining.

Turner's eremomela occupies the canopy of large trees in lowland to mid-altitude forests, and is a specialist of this habitat. In Kenya, the rainforest fragments they inhabit are between 1500 and 1700 meters of elevation. But in the Democratic Republic of Congo, these altitudes are lower. Overall, this species' elevation limits have been recorded to be from 470 meters to 1900 meters. They are usually found in the open parts of the forest: clearings, edges, along streams and can live in isolated mature trees outside of the forest. However, it is sometimes also in the closed primary forest, more dense areas.

== Behaviour ==
Being almost always observed in groups, Turner's eremomela is a social species. Most of the time, these groups are composed of around 4 individuals, but some up to 15 have been recorded in the Democratic Republic of Congo.

=== Vocalisations ===
Like most rainforest species, Turner's eremomela is shy and difficult to spot in the dense canopy. Flocks are more easily heard than seen: a series of very high "titititititititi," followed by louder "si-si-chick" or "weet-su-sweet."

=== Diet ===
In local itinerant groups of between 3 and 10 individuals, these insectivorous birds search together for arthropods and caterpillars in mature tree canopies. Turner's eremomela is often seen joining larger mixed feeding flocks composed of several other Sylviid species. These 'bird-parties' are very common in the family Cisticolidae, and this species is often seen feeding alongside the Buff-throated Apalis, it shares its range with. In their area of overlap, Turner's eremomela and the Rufous-crowned eremomela do not feed in the same areas of the trees.

=== Breeding ===
Little is known on the breeding behaviour of Turner's eremomela and its early years. It is estimated that one generation lasts about 3.6 years.

== Conservation ==
=== Population status ===
Turner's eremomela has changed IUCN categories a few times in the past years: starting as Threatened in 1988, it was moved to Vulnerable from 1994 to 1996. In the year 2000 it was re-assessed to being fully endangered. These critical conservation statuses may stem from the lack of data or accurate mathematical calculations until its final assessment in August 2019. Today, the population of Turner's eremomela is estimated at around 14 000 birds in Nandi forest and another 4 300 in Kakamega forest. With abundance estimation, this would place the population at between 20 and 50 thousand individuals in total and around 13 000 to 34 000 mature individuals. Although this number is important, it seems to be continually decreasing due to the threats this species' habitat faces, justifying its conservation status as near threatened.

=== Threats ===
The more restricted the range of a species is, the more it is vulnerable to perturbations. This is the case for Turner's eremomela where the main threat to its population is a significant loss of habitat. Their native rainforests are destroyed by cultivation encroachment, illegal charcoal production, grazing and logging. Especially in the species' stronghold, Nandi Forest, commercial logging is highly destructive. In addition, one of the species' favourite trees, Croton megalocarpus, is largely targeted by this illegal activity. The deforestation doesn't only cause habitat loss but also changes canopy structure and accelerates habitat fragmentation of this gregarious species.

Overall, non-timber crops, small-holder farming, livestock ranching and farming, logging, and wood harvesting are the main causes of the ongoing destruction of Turner's eremomela's habitat. This restricts even more the already very small and patchy range of the species.

=== Conservation measures ===
A few conservation measures are in place to help Turner's eremomela and other threatened birds in these areas. The measures, of course, are focused on the habitat, the forests they inhabit. The northern part of Kakamega Forest was designated as a national reserve. This makes it better protected and completely bans logging activities. Educating the local population on the importance of conservation work is crucial to ensure these efforts will be carried on by future generations. Thus, a small group of local guides have started educational programs around Kakamega and are working towards replicating them around Nandi forest.

Other actions have been proposed to the same ends. They include more thorough and large-scale protection of the forest patches this species lives in. A better study of the species, from its life history and ecology to actual, precise status and distribution would help understand its needs and inform useful measures. Finally, efficiently enforcing the logging bans, especially on indigenous trees, present both in Kenya and Democratic Republic of Congo, and would be hugely beneficial to all remaining rainforest birds that need these pristine, undisturbed habitats.

However, it is important to remember that Turner's eremomela is highly specialised and restricted in its habitat and diet. Therefore, simply having a contiguous, closed-canopy forest is not enough if it is mostly composed of non-native trees. These forests do not support the desired prey items or provide suitable habitat. It is important to try to recreate its original habitat conditions as much as possible.
