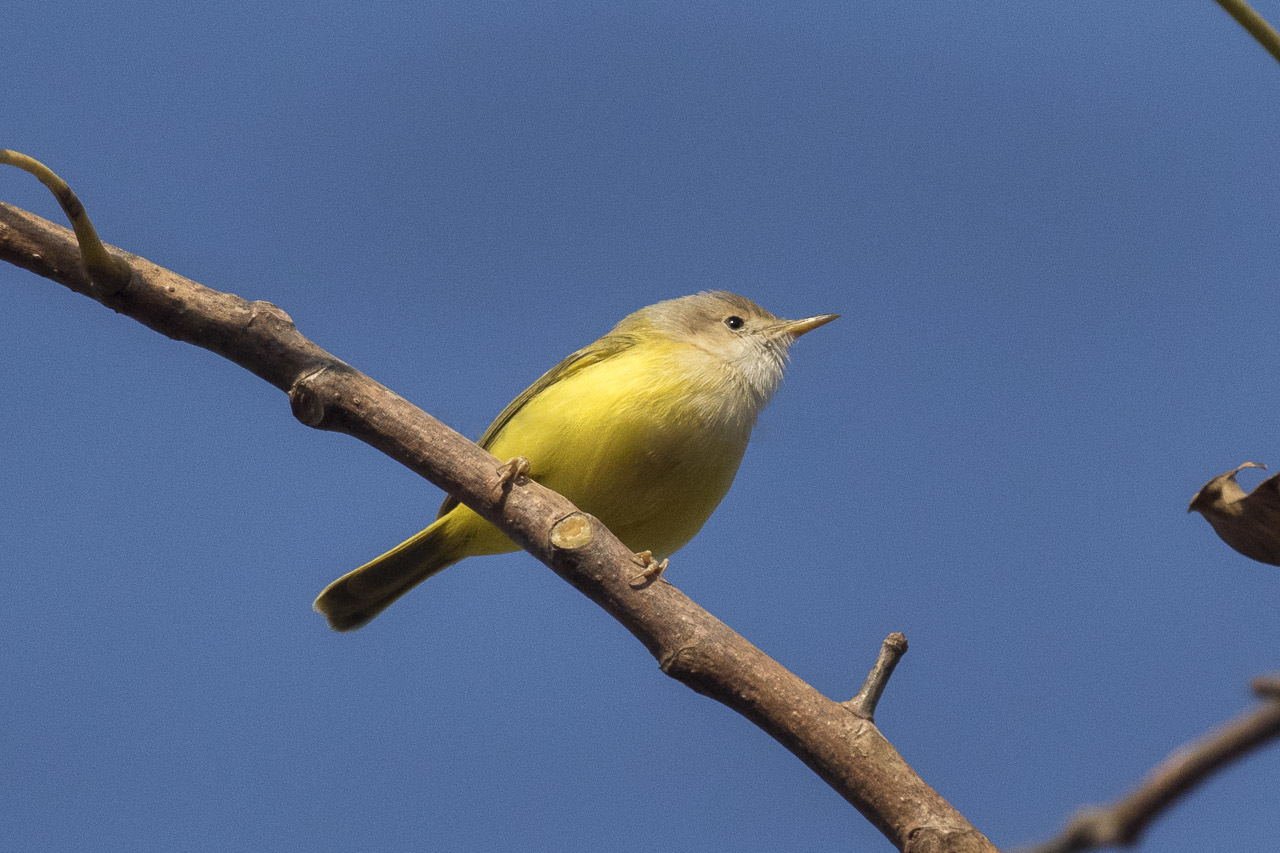

Conservation status
- Least Concern (IUCN 3.1)

Scientific classification
- Kingdom: Animalia
- Phylum: Chordata
- Class: Aves
- Order: Passeriformes
- Family: Cisticolidae
- Genus: Eremomela
- Species: E. pusilla

Binomial name
- Eremomela pusilla Hartlaub, 1857

= Senegal eremomela =

Species of bird

The Senegal eremomela (Eremomela pusilla) is a member of the African warbler family, the Cisticolidae. It occurs in the savannas of western Sub-Saharan Africa.

== Taxonomy ==
The Senegal eremomela was described by the German ornithologist Gustav Hartlaub in 1857 and given its current binomial name Eremomela pusilla. The type locality is Senegal. The species has been treated as conspecific with the green-backed eremomela, as they hybridizes in a narrow zone of sympatry along the Cameroon-Central African Republic border.

== Description ==
The Senegal eremomela is a small bird with a pale brownish grey head and a pale white supercilium. The back and mantle are green, becoming a brighter yellowish green on the rump, the throat and upper breast are white becoming bright lemon yellow on the lower breast, belly and vent. Blackish bill with a pale lower mandible and pale brownish legs.

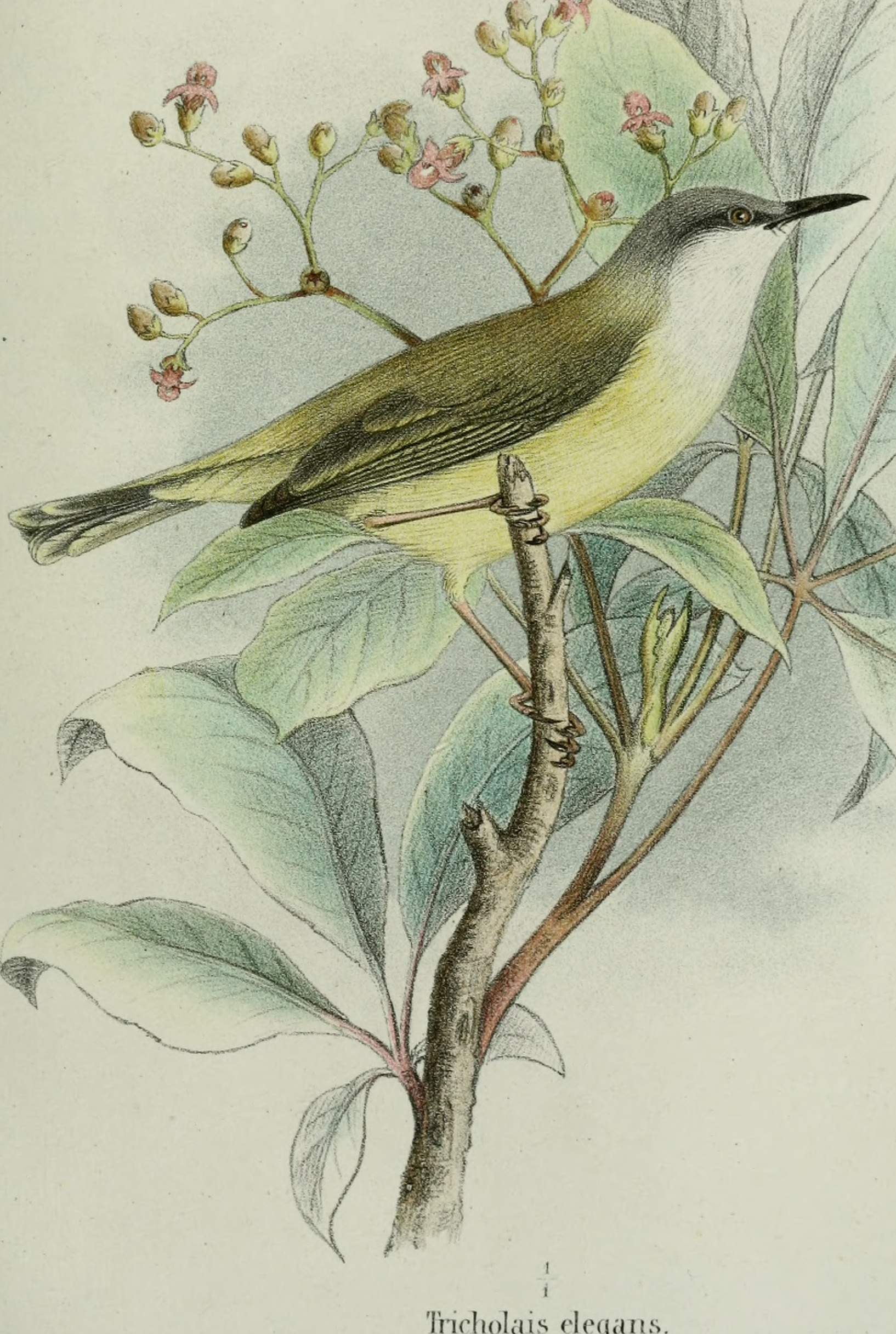

=== Voice ===
The territorial call is a rarely heard harsh and rapid chattering. It trills constantly when foraging. It joins the morning chorus with a dull monotonous and rhythmic "whup-whup-whup" sand from a perch before and at the start of the breeding season.

== Distribution ==
Western Africa from extreme southern Mauritania and Senegal to north western Cameroon, south-western Chad and far north-western Central African Republic.

== Habits and habitat ==
The Senegal eremomela occurs in small parties which actively forage in wooded savanna, cultivated areas and orchards. It is arboreal and insectivorous feeding on ants, beetles, caterpillars and other larvae, as well as some fruit. It breeds in the first half of the year in the west, although egg laying has been recorded as late as October in the Ivory Coast.
