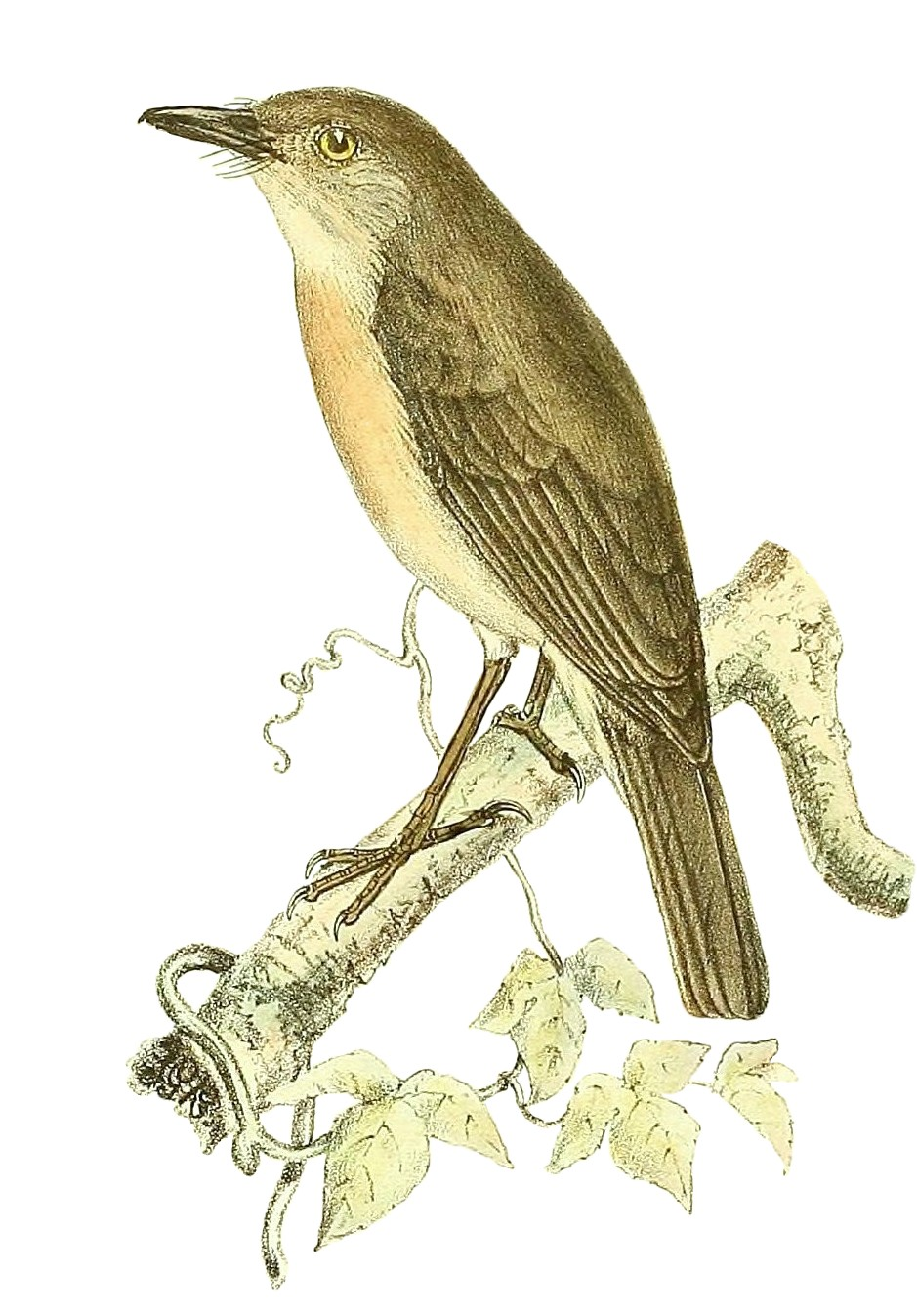
- Common newtonia (Newtonia brunneicauda)

Scientific classification
- Kingdom: Animalia
- Phylum: Chordata
- Class: Aves
- Order: Passeriformes
- Family: Vangidae
- Genus: Newtonia; Schlegel, 1867

Type species
- Erythrosterna brunneicauda A. Newton, 1863

Species
- N. amphichroa; N. brunneicauda; N. archboldi; N. fanovanae

= Newtonia (bird) =

Genus of birds

Newtonia is a genus of passerine birds containing four species. They were formerly classified in the Old World warbler family Sylviidae or Old World flycatcher family Muscicapidae but have recently been shown to belong to the vanga family Vangidae. They are endemic to Madagascar where they occur in forest or scrubland. They forage in pairs for insects, often joining mixed-species feeding flocks.

They are small plump birds, about 12 centimetres in length. They have slender bills and usually have a pale eye. Their plumage is mainly grey or brown, paler on the underparts. They have loud, repeated songs.

== Species list ==
The genus contains four species:

Image	Common name	Scientific name	Distribution
	Dark newtonia	Newtonia amphichroa	Montane and mid-elevation humid forest of northeastern and east-central Madagascar.
	Common newtonia	Newtonia brunneicauda	Forested regions throughout Madagascar.
	Archbold's newtonia	Newtonia archboldi	Southern Madagascar, in two disjunct populations in the southwest and southeast.
	Red-tailed newtonia	Newtonia fanovanae	Lowland humid evergreen forest of eastern Madagascar, from Marojejy National Park south to the southern limit of humid forest in southeastern Madagascar.
