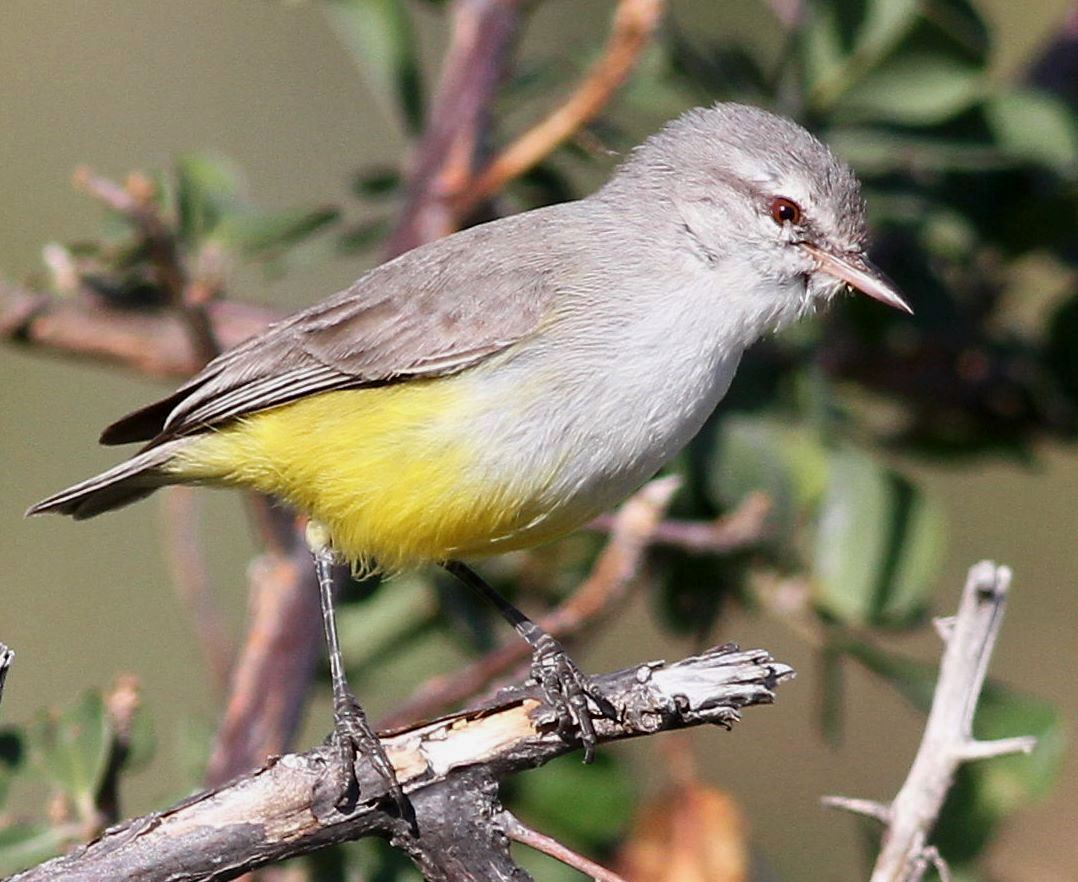
- At Mapungubwe NP, South Africa

Conservation status
- Least Concern (IUCN 3.1)

Scientific classification
- Kingdom: Animalia
- Phylum: Chordata
- Class: Aves
- Order: Passeriformes
- Family: Cisticolidae
- Genus: Eremomela
- Species: E. icteropygialis

Binomial name
- Eremomela icteropygialis (Lafresnaye, 1839)

= Yellow-bellied eremomela =

Species of bird

The yellow-bellied eremomela (Eremomela icteropygialis) is an Old World warbler. However, the taxonomy of the "African warblers", an assemblage of usually species-poor and apparently rather ancient "odd warblers" from Africa is currently in a state of flux. Today, most taxonomists consider members in this genus members of the family Cisticolidae.

The yellow-bellied eremomela is a common breeding species in Africa south of the Sahara in its habitat of open woodland, savannah, and dry scrub.

== Description ==
The yellow-bellied eremomela is a very small bird 10 cm long and weighing around 9 g. Its upperparts are grey, becoming darker and more olive on the wings and tail. There is a thin pale grey supercilium and a blackish stripe through the eye. The grey breast shades into the lemon yellow belly. The bill is blackish. The subspecies vary in the extent and intensity of the yellow on the belly, and birds in western southern Africa have whitish throat and breast.

The sexes are similar, but the juvenile has duller yellow underparts than the adult. The call is a high-pitched repeated tchee-tchee-tchuut.

== Behaviour ==
The yellow-bellied eremomela builds a cup nest in the branches of a tree or shrub, and lays two to four white eggs. This territorial species is monogamous, pairing for life.

This bird is usually seen alone, in pairs, or in family groups as it forages on the ground or in foliage for insects and other small invertebrates

== Conservation status ==
This common species has a large range, with an estimated extent of 7,100,000 km². The population size is believed to be large, and the species is not believed to approach the thresholds for the population decline criterion of the IUCN Red List (i.e. declining more than 30% in ten years or three generations). For these reasons, the species is evaluated as least concern.

The race salvadorii, from Zaire, Gabon, Angola and Zambia, is sometimes treated as a separate species, Eremomela salvadorii.
