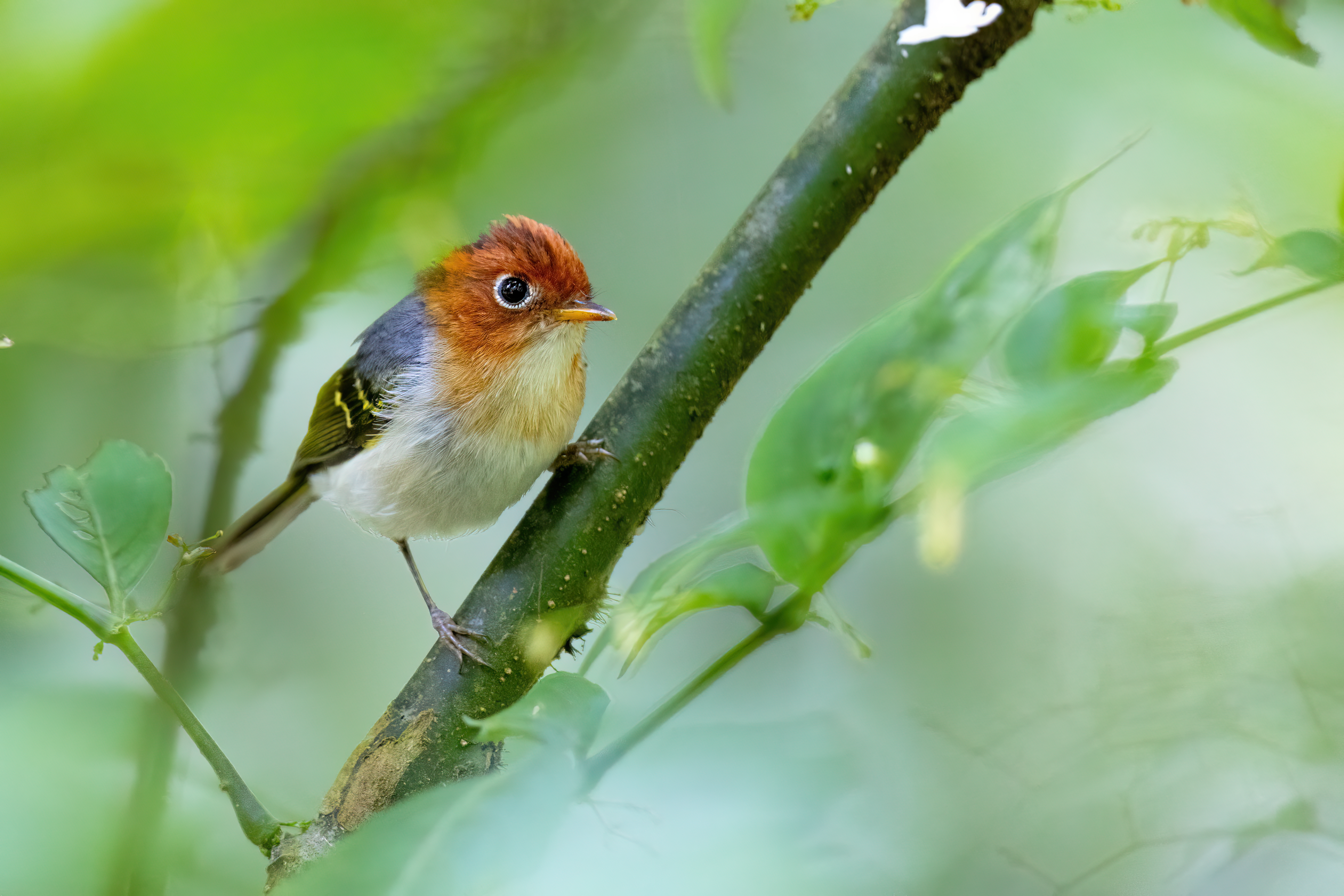

Conservation status
- Least Concern (IUCN 3.1)

Scientific classification
- Kingdom: Animalia
- Phylum: Chordata
- Class: Aves
- Order: Passeriformes
- Family: Phylloscopidae
- Genus: Phylloscopus
- Species: P. grammiceps

Binomial name
- Phylloscopus grammiceps (Strickland, 1849)

Synonyms
- Seicercus grammiceps

= Sunda warbler =

Species of bird

The Sunda warbler (Phylloscopus grammiceps) is a species of Old World warbler in the family Phylloscopidae. It is found only in Indonesia.

The Sunda warbler was previously placed in the genus Seicercus. A molecular phylogenetic study published in 2018 found that neither Phylloscopus nor Seicercus were monophyletic. In the subsequent reorganization the two genera were merged into Phylloscopus which has priority under the rules of the International Commission on Zoological Nomenclature.
