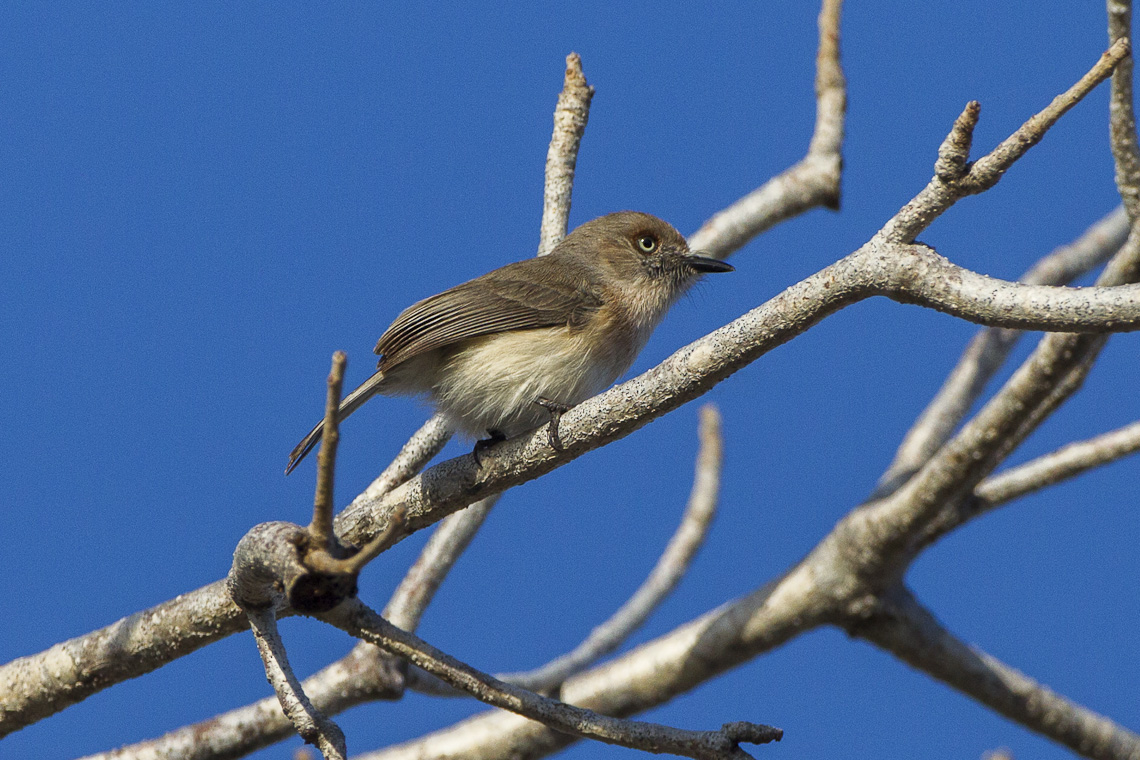

Conservation status
- Least Concern (IUCN 3.1)

Scientific classification
- Kingdom: Animalia
- Phylum: Chordata
- Class: Aves
- Order: Passeriformes
- Family: Vangidae
- Genus: Newtonia
- Species: N. archboldi

Binomial name
- Newtonia archboldi Delacour & Berlioz, 1931

= Archbold's newtonia =

Species of bird

Archbold's newtonia (Newtonia archboldi) is a species of bird in the family Vangidae. It is endemic to Madagascar. Its natural habitats are subtropical or tropical dry forests and subtropical or tropical dry shrubland. The birds have a greyish brown back and tail, with a rufous forecrown and a buffy white belly, throat, and undertail coverts. They have a conspicuous rufous eye-ring, accompanied with a black bill and pale yellow eyes. The species is sexually monomorphic, and there is no major difference between the sexes. There is no breeding plumage for the males.

The newtonia is an insectivore and feeds almost entirely on arthropods. Food is typically gleaned from twigs and foliage, or less commonly from bark or from the ground. It builds an open cup nest which are supported on shrubs. Clutches are typically of 3 eggs. The eggs are reddish white in colour and have many pale brown spots on the larger end of the egg.

The name commemorates the New Guinea explorer and ornithologist Richard Archbold.

== Taxonomy and systematics ==
The species is monotypic. The species epithet archboldi is in honour of the American zoologist Richard Archbold, who participated in the Mission Zoologique Franco-Aniglo-Américaine à Madagascar, which was when this species was discovered.

== Description ==
It is a small, short-winged, and long-legged bird with a short and slender beak. It is 12 cm (4.7 in) long and weighs 7.2–8.3 g (0.25–0.29 oz). The average bill length is 13.5 mm (0.53 in).

The top of the head and the upperparts are greyish brown, with a rufous wash on the forecrown and a dark rufous ring around the eyes. The central chin and throat are buffy white, along with the belly and undertail coverts. The breast and flanks are cinnamon buff. The cheeks and auriculars are greyish brown and the tail is grey brown. It has a black bill with pale yellow eyes. The species is sexually monomorphic. Juveniles have less rufous on the head, and have their greater wing coverts are also broadly tipped with rufous brown, with the secondaries edged buff.

=== Calls ===
Songs are generally made from concealed perches. Their calls have been described as "a rapid series of strong, rather low-pitched whistles". The songs are distinctive variable warbles composed of 4-5 syllables, either "tee-too tekhew" or "chichichich wit-tee tew". Other calls include "tchiew". Songs are described as varying from individual to individual. Singing is not restricted to just the breeding season, but is also often heard outside of the breeding season.

== Behaviour and ecology ==
The species is arboreal and moves through shrubs and low trees by hopping. It less social than the similar common newtonia, but is found in mixed species flocks of insectivores, although it is sometimes on the edges of such flocks. It often travels in family groups of 2-5 birds, either of mixed species or apart. It might be preyed on by raptors such as France's sparrowhawk that generally prey on other small birds.

=== Diet ===
The species is mainly insectivorous, feeding almost entirely on arthropods. The stomach content of observed birds has been found to consist of spiders, beetles, true bugs, termites, caterpillars, and grasshoppers.

Foraging occurs individually in the understory and midstory of the forest. They are active while foraging, hopping through the branches of shrubs and trees. They glean their prey from twigs and foliage, also sometimes taking it from bark or from the ground.

=== Reproduction ===
They are thought to be socially monogamous.

Nests have been seen from September, November, and December. Nests have been seen around 0.95 m (3.1 ft) above the ground in shrubs. The nests are cup-shaped and 6 cm (2.4 in) wide, with an inside diameter of 4 cm (1.6 in) and a depth of 4 cm (1.6 in). They are made of long, fine, dry petioles, with an outer lining made of dry leaves. The nest is supported by 4 thin twigs, two of which go through the nest and two of which are attached to the nest with cobwebs. The bases of nests are unsupported by any surface.

Eggs of the species are laid in clutches of 3 eggs. They have dimensions of 15.7 mm × 11.4 mm (0.62 in × 0.45 in) on average. The eggs are reddish white in colour, with several pale brown spots around the larger end of the egg. They are incubated by both sexes. Juveniles are generally seen in November-December, with some records appearing as late as May.

== Distribution and habitat ==
The range of this species is restricted to southern Madagascar. It occurs primarily near the coast, but is also found farther inland. It has a very low population in southern Madagascar, suggesting that the species has two disjunct populations in southwestern and southeastern Madagascar. It typically occurs below 100 m (330 ft), but can appear as high up a 600 m (2,000 ft) on rocky massifs. It does not migrate and is resident in its range for the whole year.

It mainly inhabits spiny forests composed of Didiereaceae, Euphorbia, and baobabs, and the neighbouring scrubby vegetation. However, it does not commonly occur in coastal Euphorbia forests. It is also known to inhabit degraded deciduous broadleaved forest in the northernmost parts of its range, and is also known to locally inhabit littoral forests in parts of its range in southeastern Madagascar.

== Status ==
The species has been assessed by the IUCN as least concern. It is fairly common throughout its range. The forests it inhabits in coastal southern Madagascar have experienced a very high rate of logging. Its population, however, appears stable.
