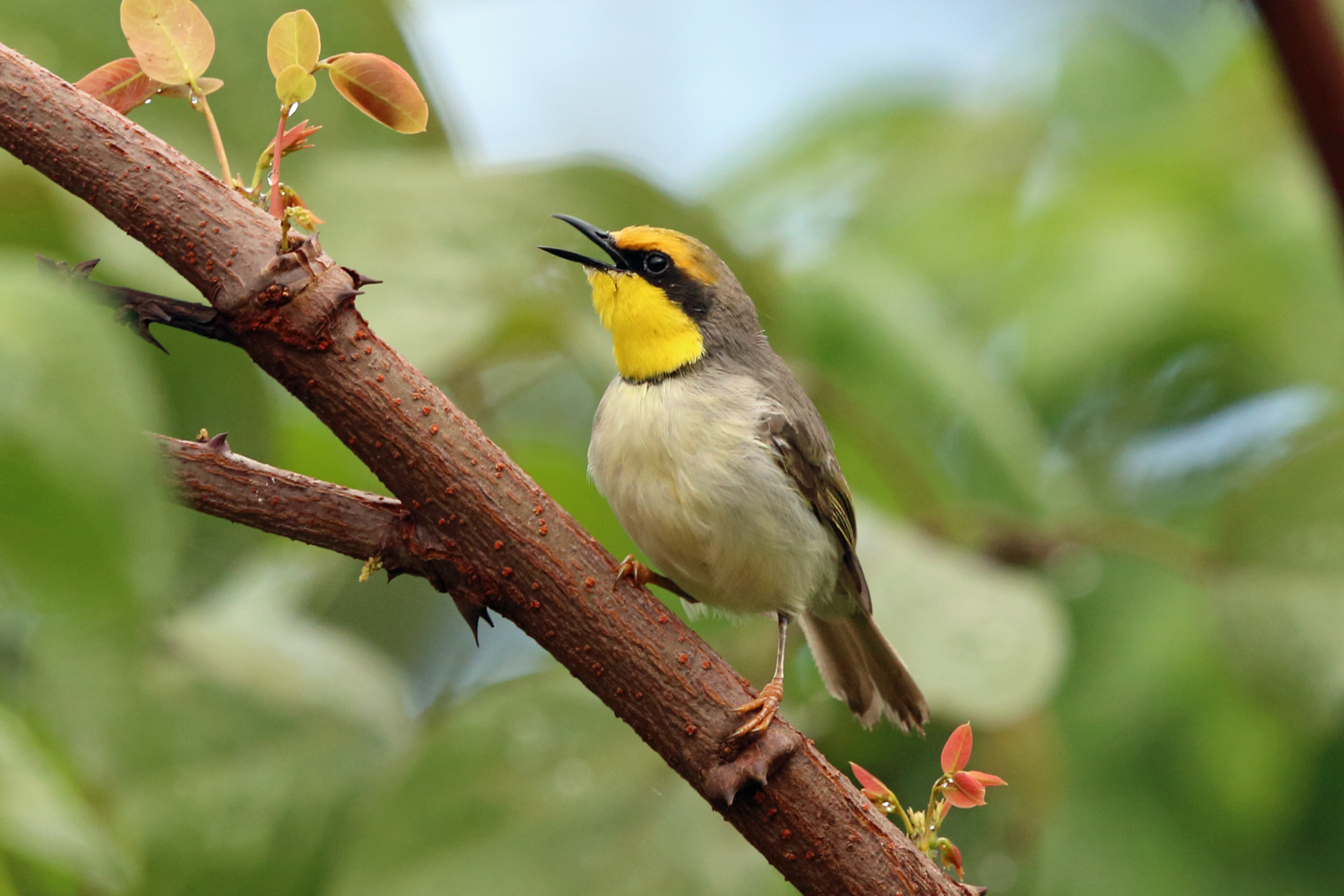

Conservation status
- Least Concern (IUCN 3.1)

Scientific classification
- Kingdom: Animalia
- Phylum: Chordata
- Class: Aves
- Order: Passeriformes
- Family: Cisticolidae
- Genus: Eremomela
- Species: E. atricollis

Binomial name
- Eremomela atricollis Barboza du Bocage, 1894

= Black-necked eremomela =

Species of bird

The black-necked eremomela (Eremomela atricollis) is a species of bird formerly placed in the "Old World warbler" assemblage, but now placed in the family Cisticolidae.

It is found in Angola, Democratic Republic of the Congo, and Zambia. Its natural habitats are subtropical or tropical dry forests and dry savanna (namely miombo woodland).

== Taxonomy ==
The black-necked eremomela was described by José Vicente Barbosa du Bocage in 1894. Atricollis means black-necked. There are currently no recognised subspecies.

== Description ==
The black-necked eremomela is a small bird, being on average 11 cm long and weighing 10 g. It has a white breast with a grey back and olive wings. It has a black mask around its eye with a yellow-orange crown above and a bright yellow throat below, and a distinctive thin black collar. Its call is a "dzrrt dzrrt" repeated for five seconds at a time.

== Distribution ==
The black-necked eremomela inhabits broadleaf woodlands in Southern Africa, often preferring forests with Brachystegia trees. Its range spans from central Angola, through southern Democratic Republic of the Congo into northern Zambia. The black-necked eremomela is localised and uncommon throughout its range.

== Status ==
The black-necked eremomela is currently assessed as Least Concern by the IUCN, owing to its large range and no signs of a decrease in population.
