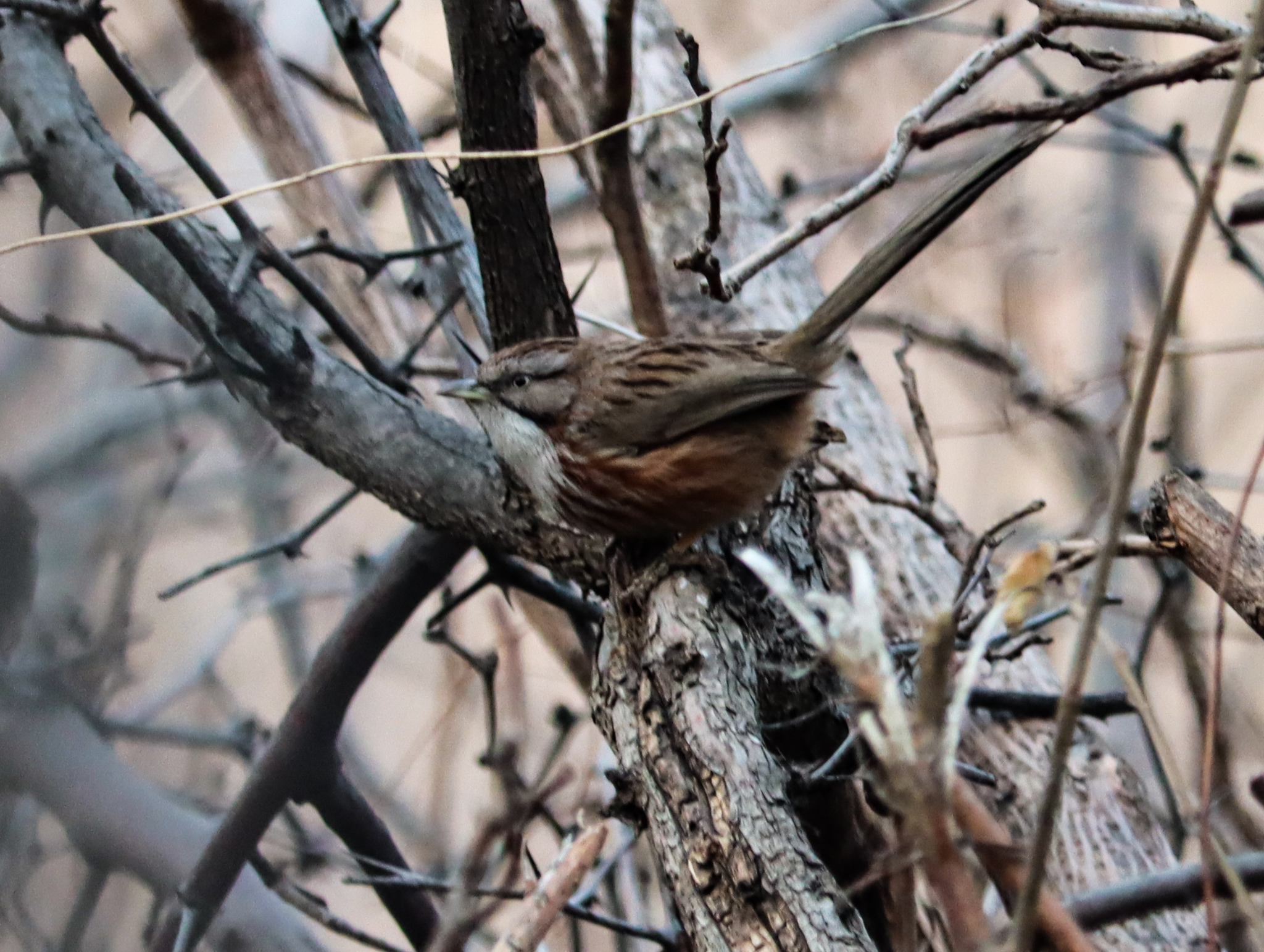

Conservation status
- Least Concern (IUCN 3.1)

Scientific classification
- Kingdom: Animalia
- Phylum: Chordata
- Class: Aves
- Order: Passeriformes
- Family: Paradoxornithidae
- Genus: Rhopophilus
- Species: R. pekinensis

Binomial name
- Rhopophilus pekinensis (R. Swinhoe, 1868)

= Beijing babbler =

Species of bird

The Beijing babbler (Rhopophilus pekinensis), also known as the white-browed Chinese warbler, Chinese hill warbler, or Chinese bush-dweller, is a species of bird in the genus Rhopophilus. It is now thought to be a close relative of the parrotbilss and is placed in the family Paradoxornithidae; previously, it was placed in the families Cisticolidae, Timaliidae or Sylviidae. It is found in northern China and North Korea, and formerly occurred in South Korea. The species was first described by Robert Swinhoe in 1868.
