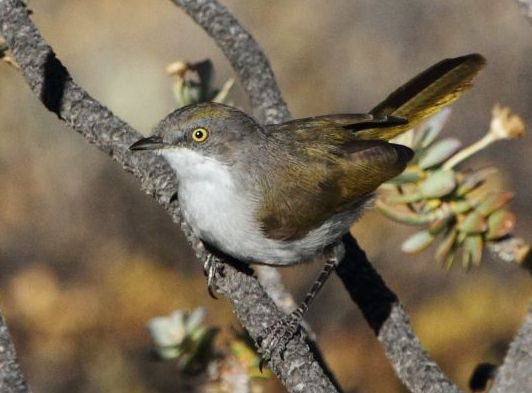

Conservation status
- Least Concern (IUCN 3.1)

Scientific classification
- Kingdom: Animalia
- Phylum: Chordata
- Class: Aves
- Order: Passeriformes
- Family: Cisticolidae
- Genus: Eremomela
- Species: E. gregalis

Binomial name
- Eremomela gregalis (Smith, 1829)
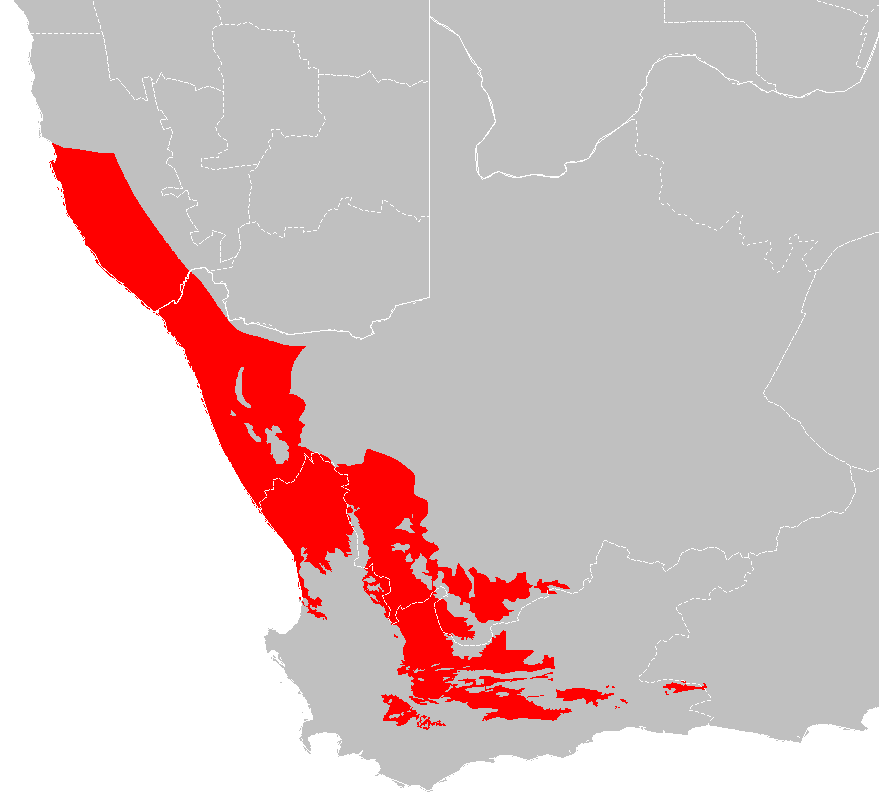
- general range: succulent karoo

= Karoo eremomela =

Species of bird

The Karoo eremomela (Eremomela gregalis), also known as the yellow-rumped eremomela, is a species of bird formerly placed in the "Old World warbler" assemblage, but now placed in the family Cisticolidae. It is found in Namibia and South Africa. Its natural habitat is subtropical or tropical dry shrubland.
