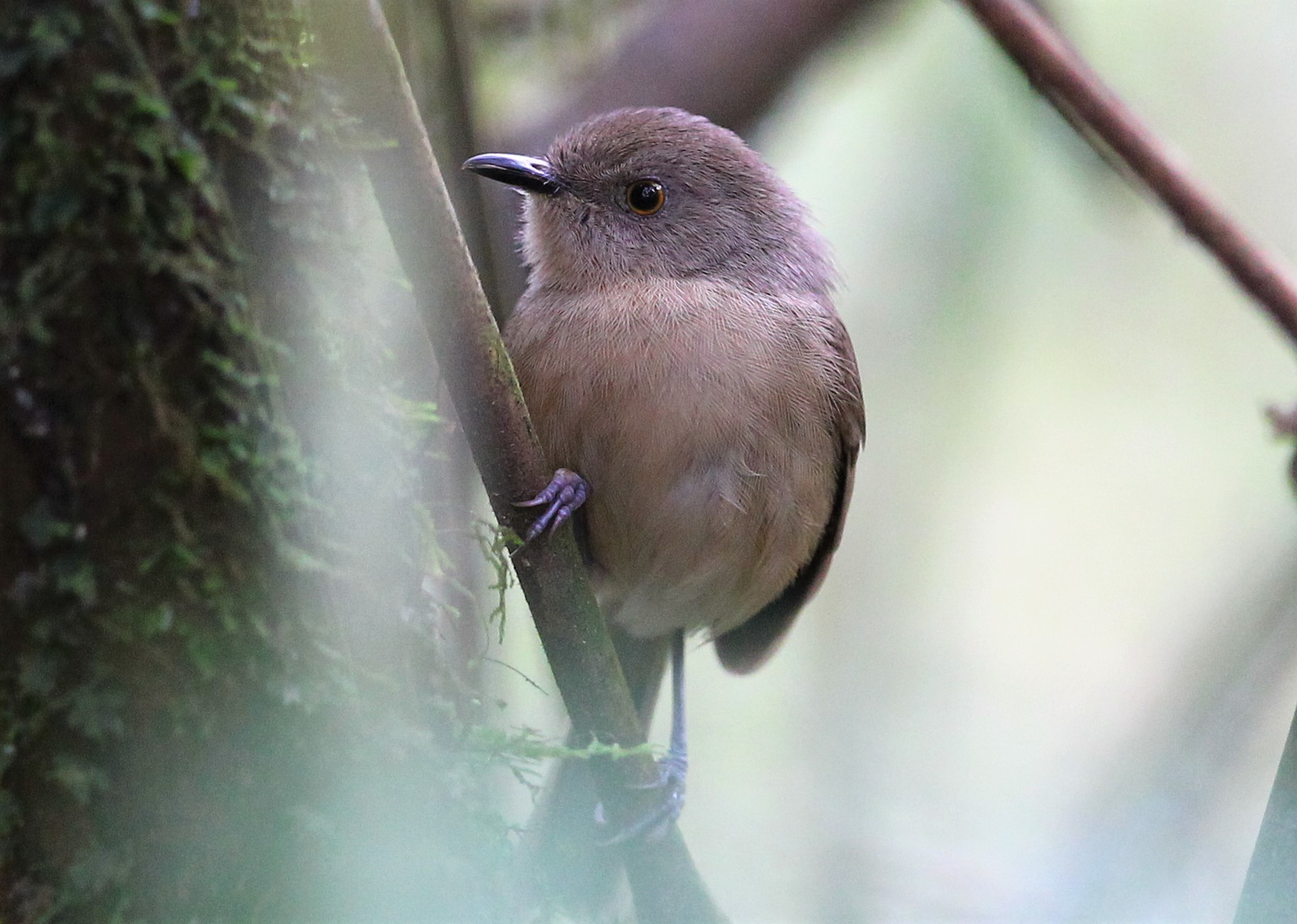

Conservation status
- Least Concern (IUCN 3.1)

Scientific classification
- Kingdom: Animalia
- Phylum: Chordata
- Class: Aves
- Order: Passeriformes
- Family: Vangidae
- Genus: Newtonia
- Species: N. amphichroa

Binomial name
- Newtonia amphichroa Reichenow, 1891

= Dark newtonia =

Species of bird

The dark newtonia (Newtonia amphichroa) is a species of bird in the family Vangidae. It is endemic to northeastern Madagascar. Its natural habitat is subtropical or tropical moist lowland forests.

== Taxonomy ==
The dark newtonia was formally described in 1891 by the German ornithologist Anton Reichenow under the current binomial name Newtonia amphichroa based on a specimen collected in southern Madagascar. The specific epithet combines the Ancient Greek αμφι/amphi meaning "on all sides" with χροα/khroa, χροας/khroas meaning "appearance" or "colour".

Two subspecies are recognised:

- N. a. amphichroa Reichenow, 1891 – montane north Madagascar
- N. a. lavarambo Goodman, Younger, Raherilalao & Reddy, 2018 – montane south Madagascar

The subspecies N. a. lavarambo was described in 2018 as a full species, but is currently treated as a subspecies of the dark newtonia by taxonomic authorities.
