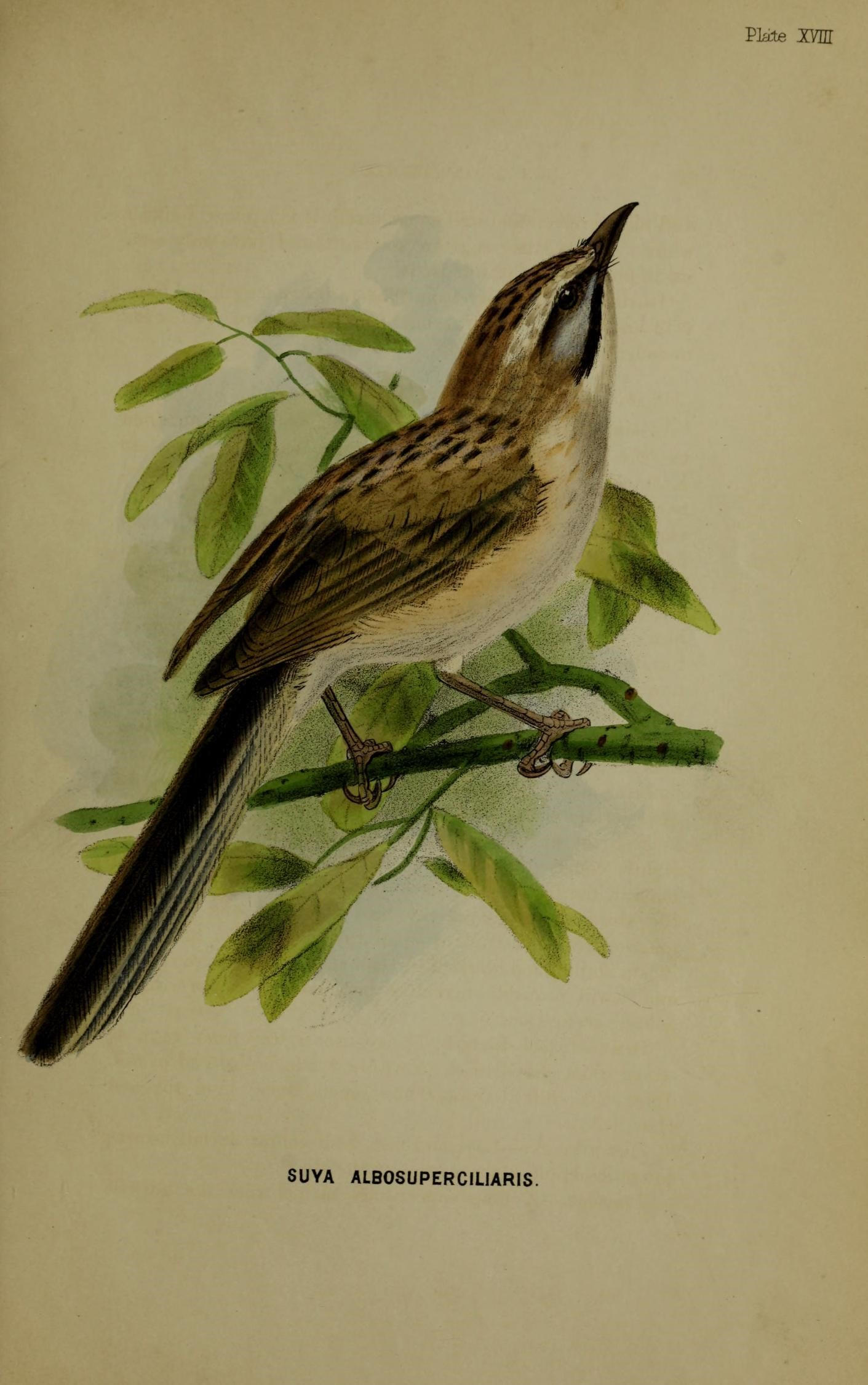

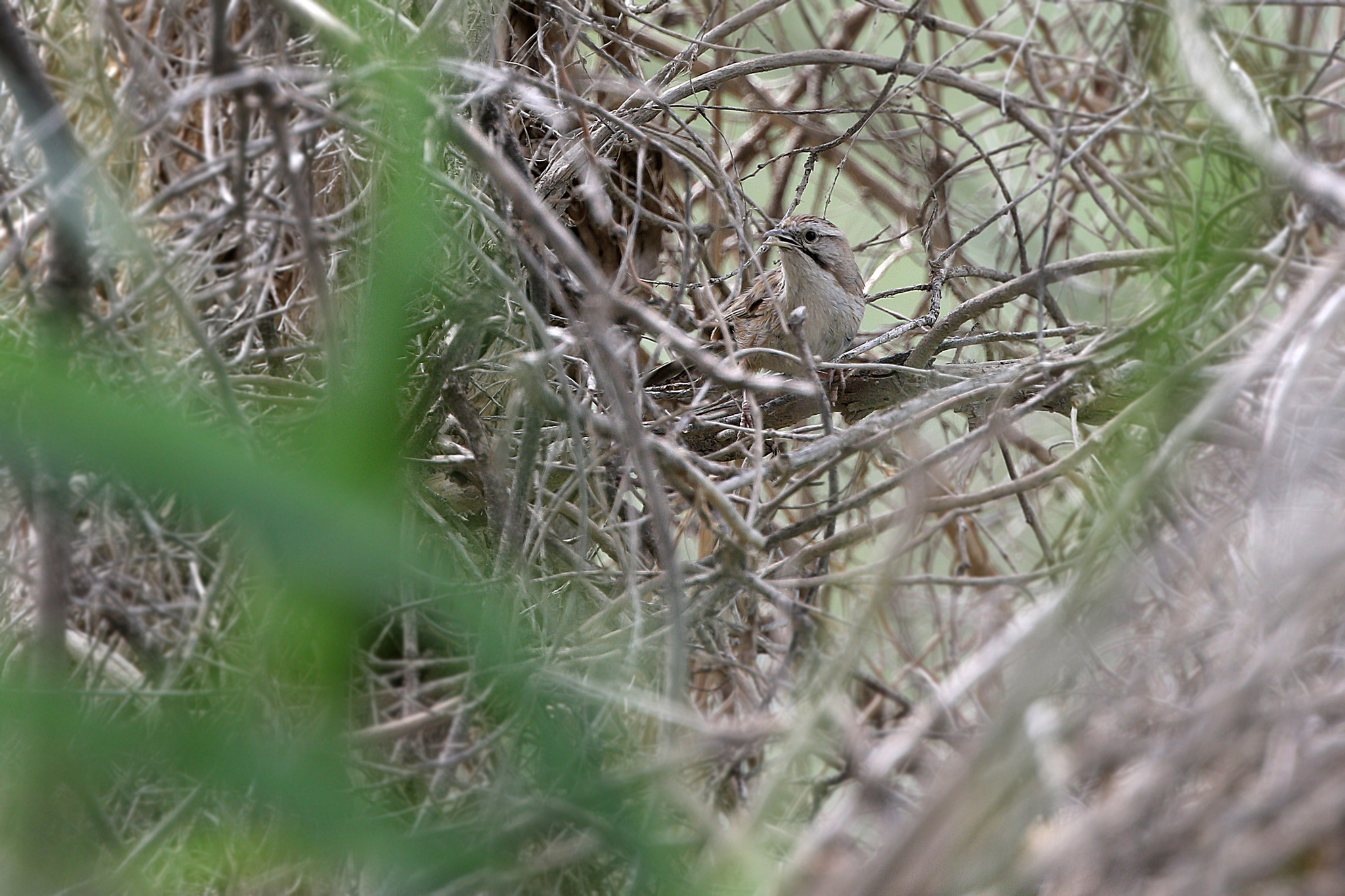

Conservation status
- Least Concern (IUCN 3.1)

Scientific classification
- Kingdom: Animalia
- Phylum: Chordata
- Class: Aves
- Order: Passeriformes
- Family: Paradoxornithidae
- Genus: Rhopophilus
- Species: R. albosuperciliaris

Binomial name
- Rhopophilus albosuperciliaris (Hume, 1871)

= Tarim babbler =

Species of bird

The Tarim babbler (Rhopophilus albosuperciliaris), also known as the Tarim hill warbler, is a species of bird in the genus Rhopophilus. It is now thought to be a close relative of the parrotbills and is placed in the family Paradoxornithidae; previously, it was placed in the families Cisticolidae, Timaliidae or Sylviidae. It is endemic to China.
