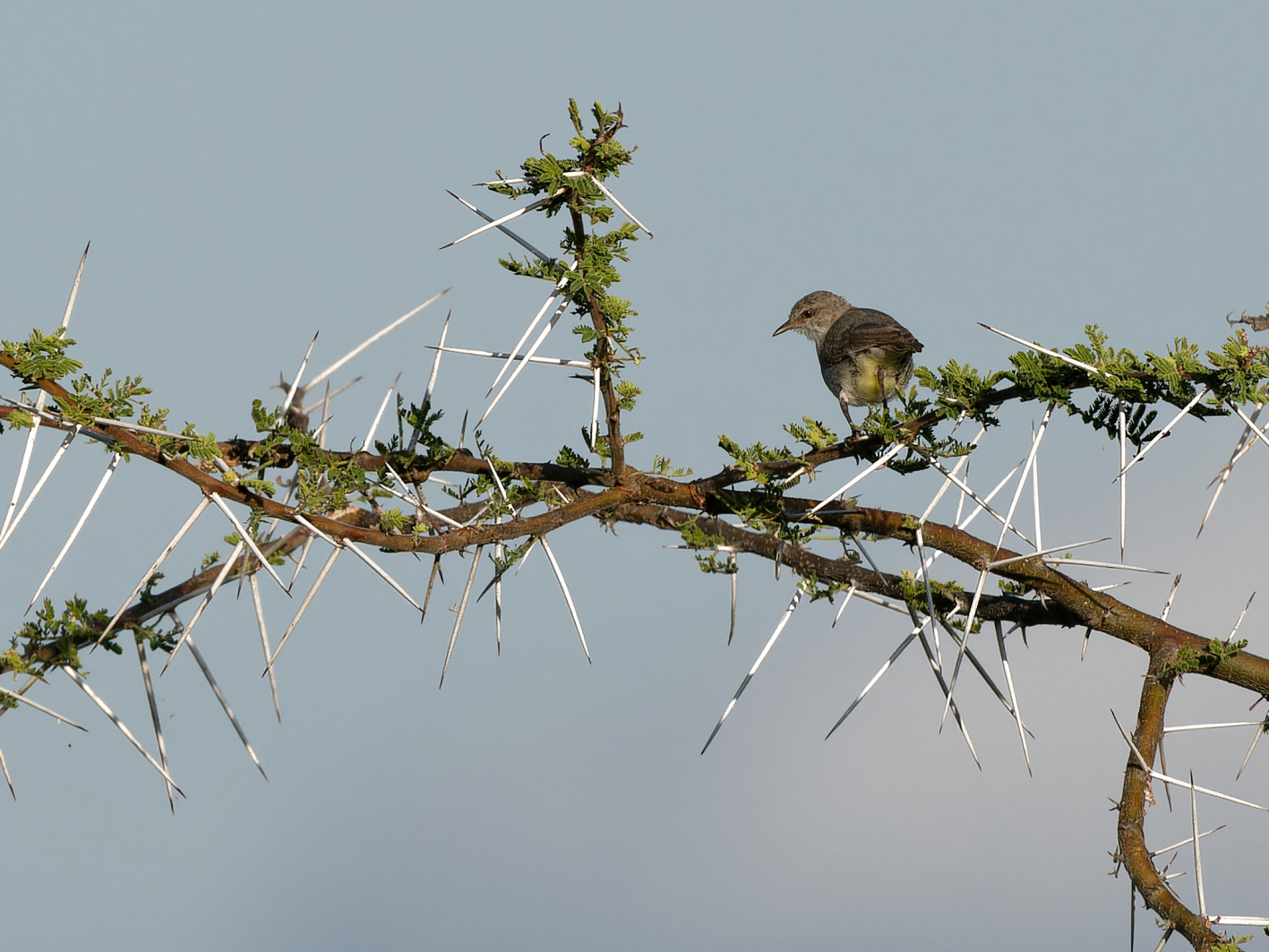
- Yellow-vented Eremomela, Kenya

Conservation status
- Least Concern (IUCN 3.1)

Scientific classification
- Kingdom: Animalia
- Phylum: Chordata
- Class: Aves
- Order: Passeriformes
- Family: Cisticolidae
- Genus: Eremomela
- Species: E. flavicrissalis

Binomial name
- Eremomela flavicrissalis Sharpe, 1895

= Yellow-vented eremomela =

Species of bird

The yellow-vented eremomela (Eremomela flavicrissalis) is a species of bird formerly placed in the "Old World warbler" assemblage, but now placed in the family Cisticolidae. It is found in dry savannas in Ethiopia, Kenya, Somalia, Tanzania, and Uganda.
