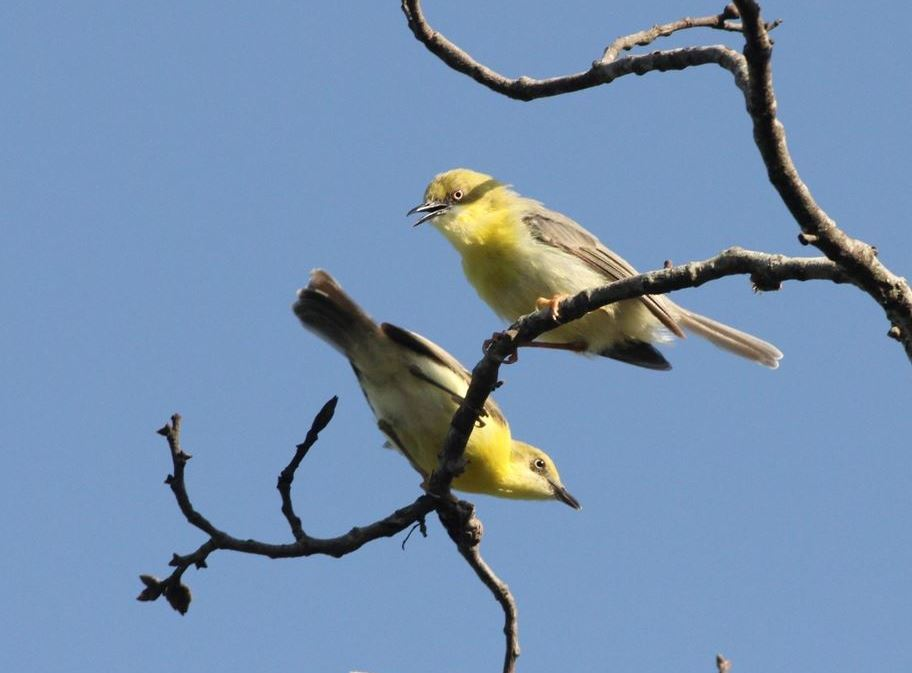
- Nominate race in eastern Zimbabwe

Conservation status
- Least Concern (IUCN 3.1)

Scientific classification
- Kingdom: Animalia
- Phylum: Chordata
- Class: Aves
- Order: Passeriformes
- Family: Cisticolidae
- Genus: Eremomela
- Species: E. scotops

Binomial name
- Eremomela scotops Sundevall, 1850

= Green-capped eremomela =

Species of bird

The green-capped eremomela or greencap eremomela (Eremomela scotops) is a species of bird formerly placed in the "Old World warbler" assemblage, but now placed in the family Cisticolidae.

== Range and habitat ==
It is found in Angola, Botswana, Burundi, Republic of the Congo, DRC, Gabon, Kenya, Malawi, Mozambique, Namibia, Rwanda, South Africa, Swaziland, Tanzania, Uganda, Zambia, and Zimbabwe. Its natural habitats are subtropical or tropical dry forests and dry savanna.

== Races ==
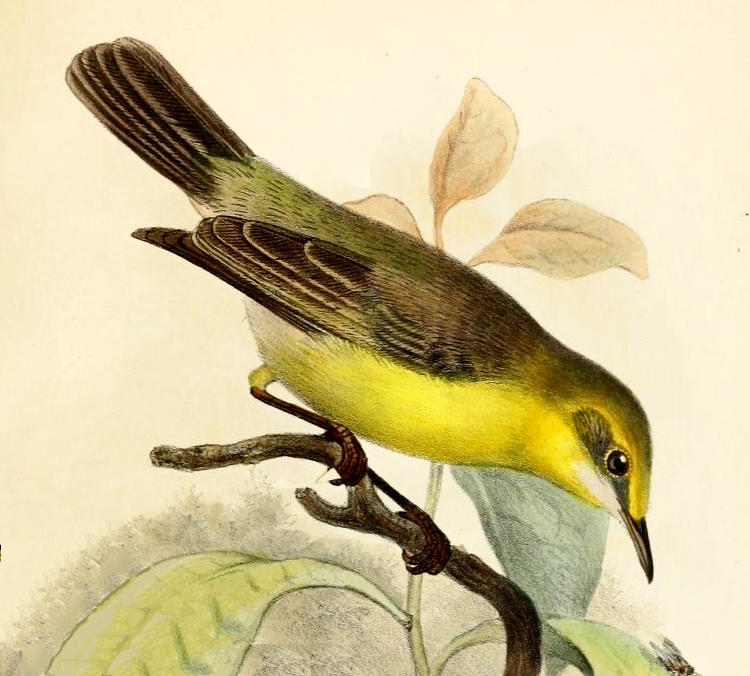
Illustration by Joseph Smit

There are five accepted races:

- E. s. congensis Reichenow, 1905 – Gabon to Angola and DRC
- E. s. pulchra (Bocage, 1878) – Angola, DRC, Zambia, western Malawi, Namibia and Botswana
- E. s. citriniceps (Reichenow, 1882) – Uganda, Kenya, Tanzania, Rwanda and Burundi
- E. s. kikuyuensis van Someren, 1931 – Kenya
- E. s. scotops Sundevall, 1850 – coastal Kenya, through eastern Malawi to northern South Africa
