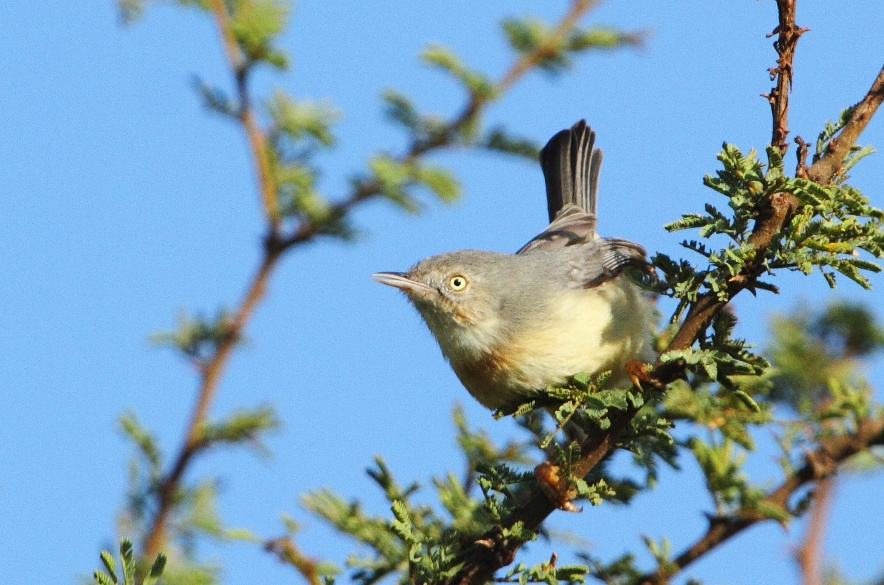

Conservation status
- Least Concern (IUCN 3.1)

Scientific classification
- Kingdom: Animalia
- Phylum: Chordata
- Class: Aves
- Order: Passeriformes
- Family: Cisticolidae
- Genus: Eremomela
- Species: E. usticollis

Binomial name
- Eremomela usticollis Sundevall, 1850

Audio

= Burnt-necked eremomela =

Species of bird

The burnt-necked eremomela (Eremomela usticollis) is a species of bird formerly placed in the "Old World warbler" assemblage, but now placed in the family Cisticolidae. It is found in Angola, Botswana, Eswatini, Malawi, Mozambique, Namibia, South Africa, Zambia, and Zimbabwe. Its natural habitats are subtropical or tropical dry forests, dry savannah, and subtropical or tropical dry shrubland.
