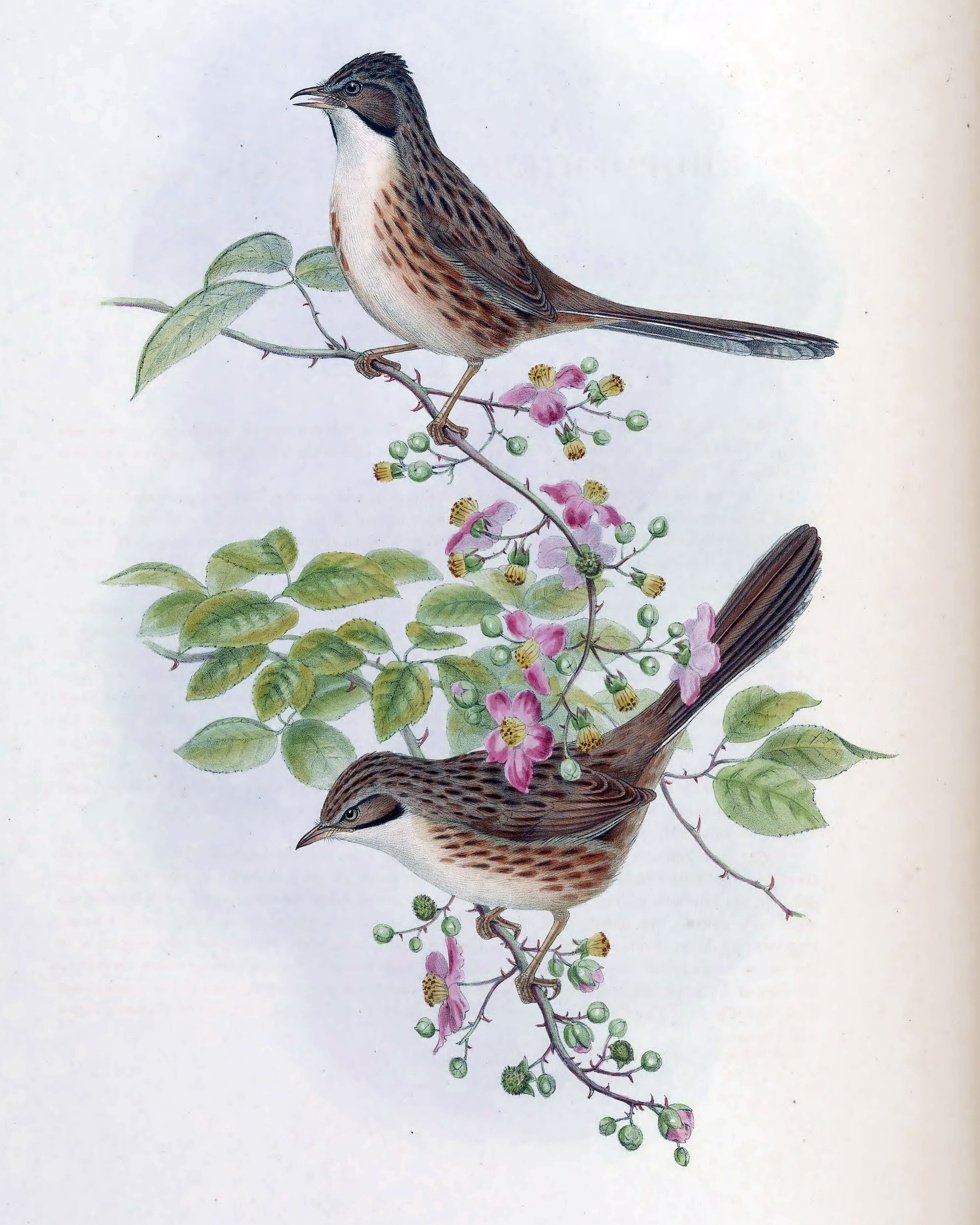
- Rhopophilus

Scientific classification
- Kingdom: Animalia
- Phylum: Chordata
- Class: Aves
- Order: Passeriformes
- Family: Paradoxornithidae
- Genus: Rhopophilus; Giglioli & Salvadori, 1870

Species
- Rhopophilus pekinensis Rhopophilus albosuperciliaris

= Rhopophilus =

Genus of birds

Rhopophilus is a genus of songbirds in the family Paradoxornithidae.

The genus contains the following two species:

Image	Common name	Scientific name
	Beijing babbler	Rhopophilus pekinensis
	Tarim babbler	Rhopophilus albosuperciliaris
