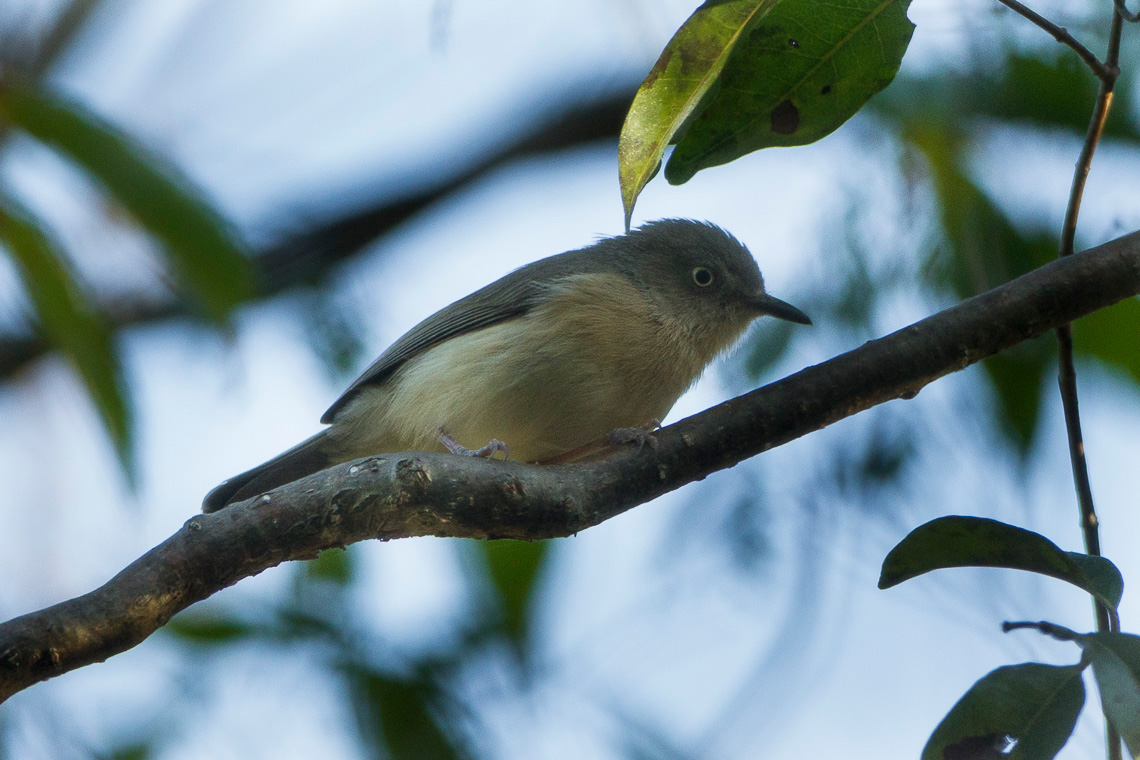

Conservation status
- Least Concern (IUCN 3.1)

Scientific classification
- Kingdom: Animalia
- Phylum: Chordata
- Class: Aves
- Order: Passeriformes
- Family: Vangidae
- Genus: Newtonia
- Species: N. brunneicauda

Binomial name
- Newtonia brunneicauda (Newton, 1863)

= Common newtonia =

Species of bird

The common newtonia (Newtonia brunneicauda) is a species of bird in the family Vangidae. It is endemic to Madagascar.

Its natural habitats are subtropical or tropical dry forests and subtropical or tropical moist lowland forests.

It is a small bird with greyish-brown upper parts, tannish-white underparts, a black bill and golden-yellow eyes.

== Taxonomy and systematics ==
There are two subspecies of the common newtonia:

Newtonia brunneicauda brunneicauda, Newton 1863- It is found in forested regions throughout Madagascar. Newtonia brunneicauda inornata is considered to be a synonym.

Newtonia brunneicauda monticola, Salomonsen 1934- It is found in the Ankaratra mountains of central Madagascar.

== Description ==
It is a small, short-winged, warbler like bird with relatively long legs. It is 12 cm in length and weighs 7–14.5 g, with a wing length of 54.5 mm. Sexes look similar to each other. It has grayish brown upperparts and is pale warm buff in colour under. The nominate species has a cold grayish brown head and upperparts, with the sides of head and neck being a lighter grayish-brown. Its tail is also grayish brown, with off-white undertail coverts. They also have very pale yellow irises with a slender, short, and black bill. The lining of the mouth is yellow. Its tarsi are pale pinkish to grayish brown.

Juveniles look similar to adults, but have browner upperparts, with rufous-brown tips on greater wing coverts and a ginger tinge on their tertials. Irises are darker than in adults.

== Ecology and behaviour ==
=== Diet ===
It is insectivorous.

== Distribution and habitat ==
The species is found throughout Madagascar, from sea level up until an elevation of 2,300 m. It is found through a variety of forests and wooded habitats, but is mostly restricted to native forest.
