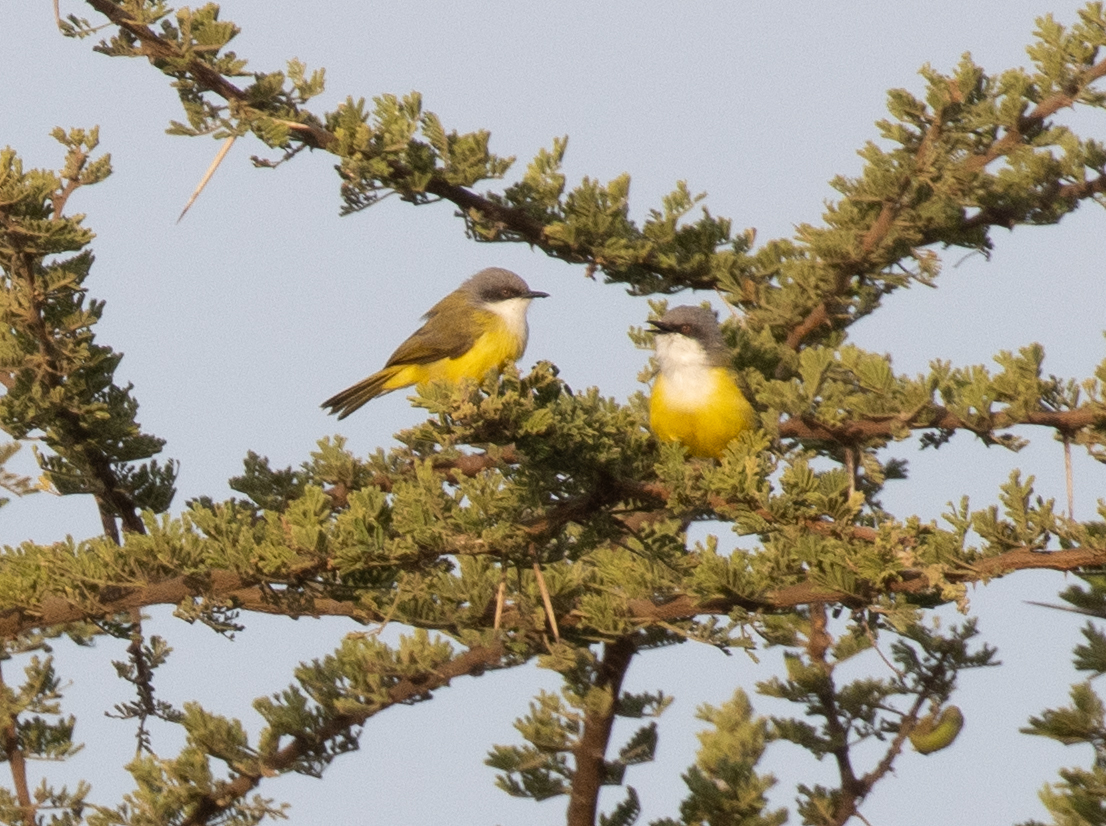

Conservation status
- Least Concern (IUCN 3.1)

Scientific classification
- Kingdom: Animalia
- Phylum: Chordata
- Class: Aves
- Order: Passeriformes
- Family: Cisticolidae
- Genus: Eremomela
- Species: E. canescens

Binomial name
- Eremomela canescens Antinori, 1864

= Green-backed eremomela =

Species of bird

The green-backed eremomela (Eremomela canescens) is a member of the Cisticolidae. This bird is a common resident breeder in tropical Africa from Kenya and Ethiopia to Cameroon.

This tiny passerine is typically found in open woodland. The green-backed eremomela builds a cup-shaped nest of leaves and silk low in a bush or tree. The normal clutch is two eggs.
