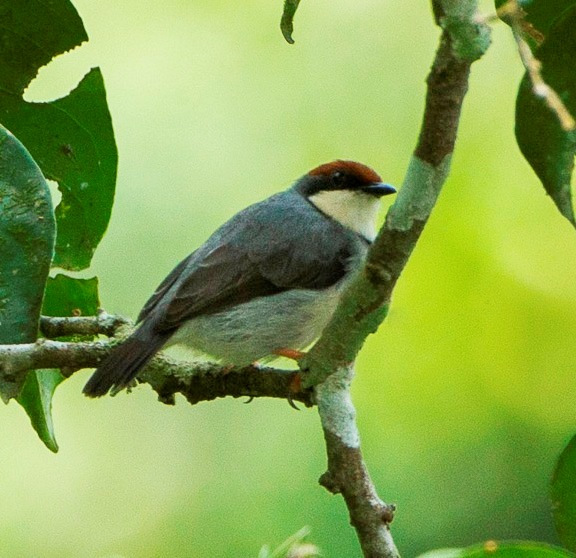

Conservation status
- Least Concern (IUCN 3.1)

Scientific classification
- Kingdom: Animalia
- Phylum: Chordata
- Class: Aves
- Order: Passeriformes
- Family: Cisticolidae
- Genus: Eremomela
- Species: E. badiceps

Binomial name
- Eremomela badiceps (Fraser, 1843)

= Rufous-crowned eremomela =

Species of bird

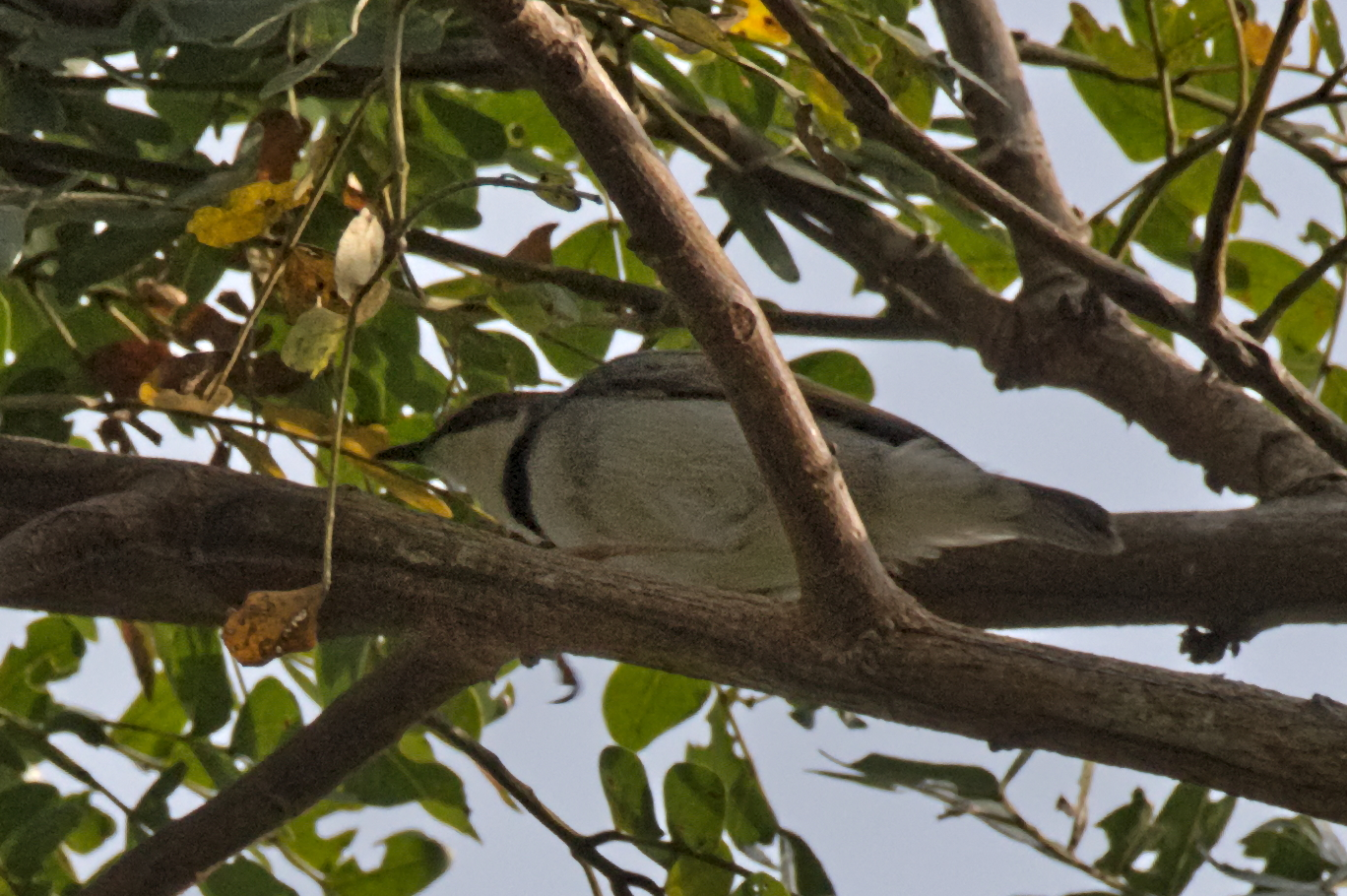
Rufous-crowned Eremomela

The rufous-crowned eremomela (Eremomela badiceps) is a species of bird formerly placed in the "Old World warbler" assemblage, but now placed in the family Cisticolidae.

It is found throughout the African tropical rainforest.
