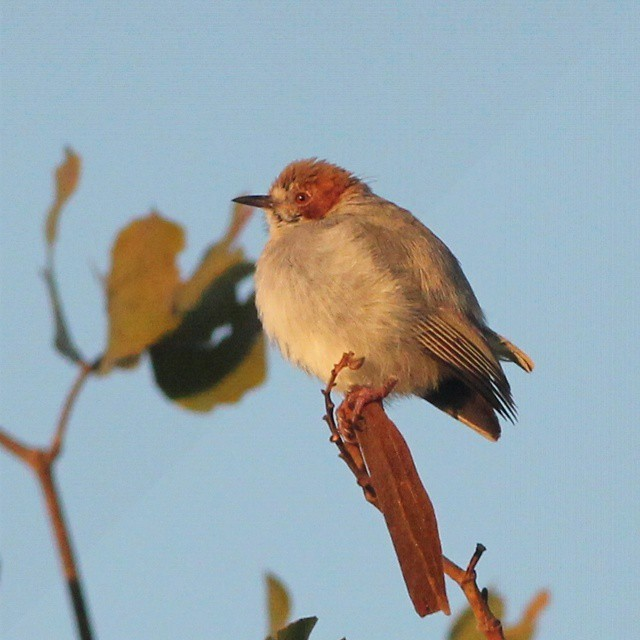

Conservation status
- Least Concern (IUCN 3.1)

Scientific classification
- Kingdom: Animalia
- Phylum: Chordata
- Class: Aves
- Order: Passeriformes
- Family: Macrosphenidae
- Genus: Sylvietta
- Species: S. ruficapilla

Binomial name
- Sylvietta ruficapilla Barboza du Bocage, 1877
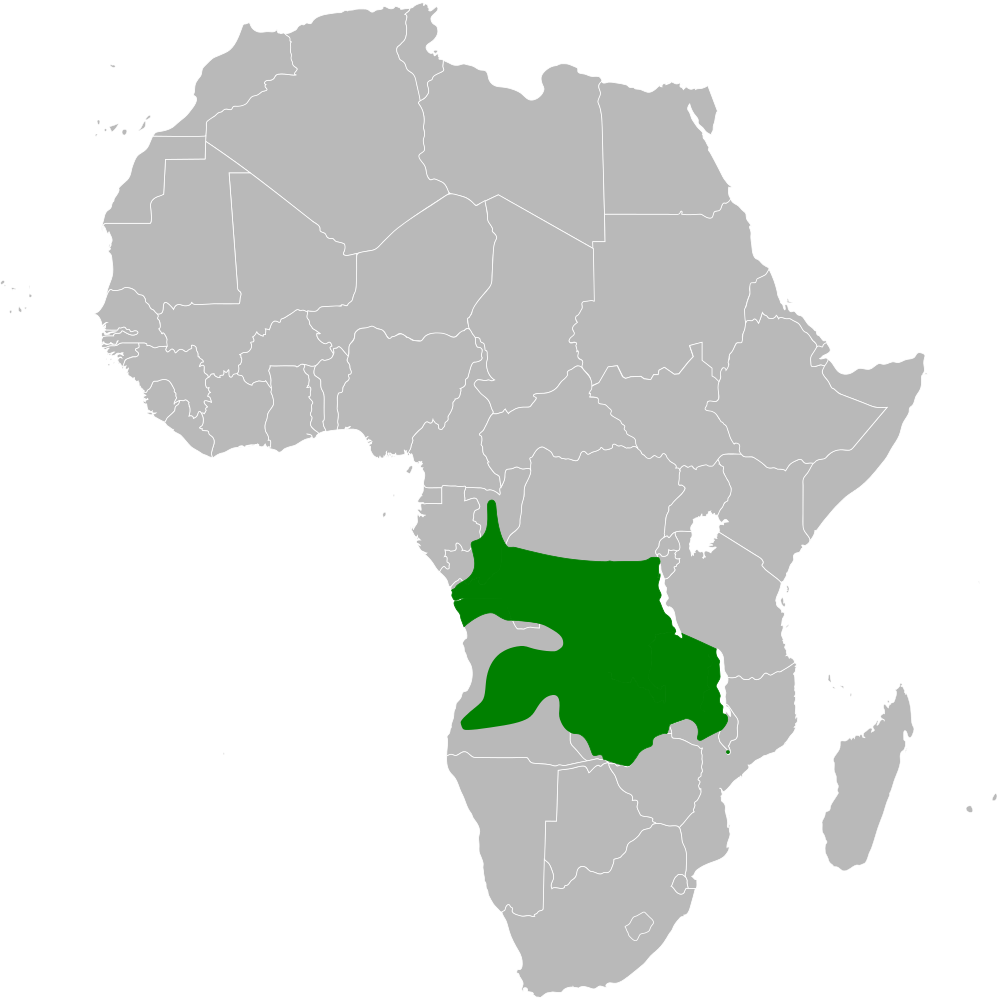

= Red-capped crombec =

Species of bird

The red-capped crombec (Sylvietta ruficapilla) is a species of African warbler, formerly placed in the family Sylviidae.

== Range ==
It is found in Angola, Republic of the Congo, the DRC, Malawi, Mozambique, Tanzania, Zambia, Zimbabwe, and possibly Botswana.

== Habitat ==
Its natural habitats are subtropical or tropical dry forests, subtropical or tropical dry shrubland, and subtropical or tropical moist shrubland. The red-capped crombec belongs to the Sylviidae family, a family considered Old World Warblers with it being a member of the genus Sylvietta. The red-capped crombec are found in sub-Saharan Africa near countries like the Republic of Congo, DRC, Zambia, and Mozambique.

== Breeding ==
The red-capped crombec has been observed to breed at the end of the dry season for countries like the Republic of Congo, DRC, Zambia, and Mozambique. They are stationary birds that nest using grass, and spider webs creating a cup shaped nest. They are often found nesting in trees and occasional tall, thick shrubs. Red-capped crombecs are found to be territorial of their nesting sites, often having 2-4 eggs, and the eggs incubate for around 12 days. Typical African warblers such as the red capped crombec tend to lay their eggs during the months September-March. They breed once yearly.

== Diet ==
The red-capped crombec forages on insects found throughout The Republic of Congo and DRC in tree tops and shrubs. Their diet includes ants, beetles, caterpillars, and spiders. The red-capped crombec has been observed using its sharp bills to pick insects off of tree leaves and shrubs on the ground. It has been recorded that the red-capped crombec will join other mixed-species parties when foraging for food.

== Description ==
The red-capped crombec is a small bird recorded to be ranging around 11 to 12 cm (4.3 to 4.7 in) in size. It has a red almost burnt orange cap on its head, with the body being an olive-brown plumage. The wings and tail are often found to be darker with the under parts lighter being a pale yellow hue. The red-capped crombec has a slim, sharp bill used for catching insects.

== Taxonomy ==
The genus of birds the crombec falls into is Sylvietta, which contains 9 species. All the other species in its family can be linked as seen as below:

The crombecs belong to a more prominent family called Macrosphenidae, The African warblers. This is broken up into 5 different genera: Macrosphenus or longbills, Sphenoeacus – cape grassbird, Melocichla - moustached grass warbler, Cryptillas – Victorin's warbler, and the Sylvietta crombecs.
