= Victorin =

Victorin is both a given name and a surname. Notable people with the name include:

- Victorin de Joncières (1839–1903), French composer
- Victorin Duguet (1905–1989), French trade union leader
- Victorin-Hippolyte Jasset (1862–1913), French film pioneer
- Victorin Lurel (born 1951), French politician
- Marie-Victorin Kirouac (1885–1944), Canadian member of Brothers of the Christian Schools
- Johan Fredrik Victorin (1831–1855), Swedish zoologist
- Guillaume Victorin (born 1990), French athlete
- Louis Victorin Cassagne (1774–1841), French general
- Djong Victorin Yu (born 1957), South Korean conductor and composer

== See also ==
- Victorin's warbler, species of African warbler
- Marie-Victorin (disambiguation), multiple items
