= Chapin's crombec =

Conservation status
- Critically Endangered (IUCN 3.1)

Scientific classification
- Kingdom: Animalia
- Phylum: Chordata
- Class: Aves
- Order: Passeriformes
- Family: Macrosphenidae
- Genus: Sylvietta
- Species: S. leucophrys
- Subspecies: S. l. chapini

Trinomial name
- Sylvietta leucophrys chapini Schouteden, 1947

Synonyms
- Sylvietta chapini

Subspecies of bird

Chapin's crombec (Sylvietta leucophrys chapini), also known as the Lendu crombec, is an enigmatic African warbler, formerly placed in the family Sylviidae. It is currently considered a subspecies of the white-browed crombec, but might be a distinct species; too little is known about it to determine this now with reasonable certainty.

It is found only in the Lendu Plateau, Democratic Republic of the Congo. It was removed from the IUCN Red List in 2007 as it is considered a white-browed crombec subspecies, pending further research. It was previously considered a species of least concern, though actually it has not been encountered for some time, and might even be extinct. However, this is not very likely given the fairly low rates of bird extinctions in Africa - compared to, e.g., South America and Southeast Asia. In any case, the Second Congo War, and especially the Ituri conflict, have completely prevented any effort to relocate these birds.

The common name commemorates the American ornithologist James Paul Chapin.
