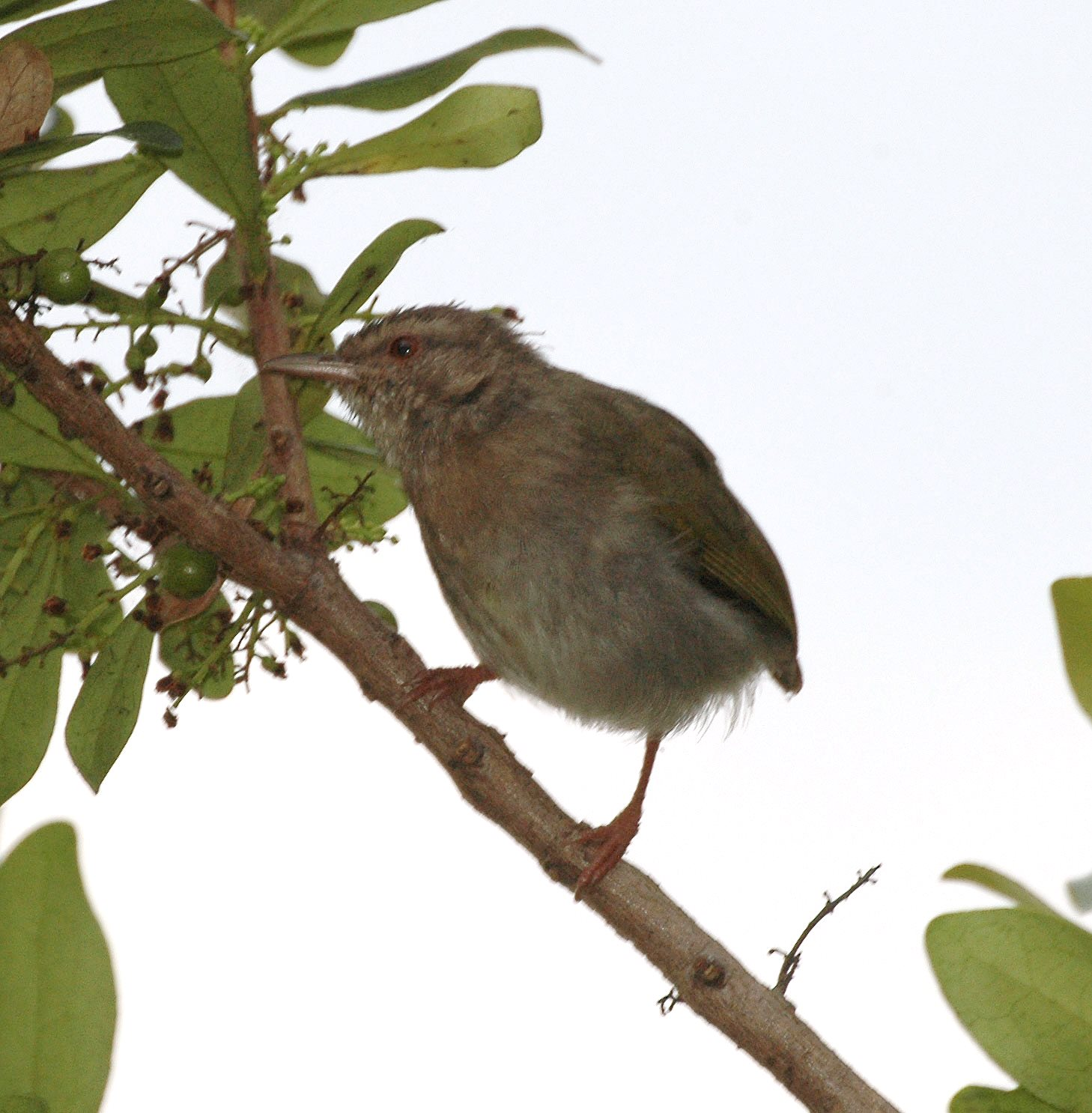
- Green crombec (Sylvietta virens)

Scientific classification
- Kingdom: Animalia
- Phylum: Chordata
- Class: Aves
- Order: Passeriformes
- Family: Macrosphenidae
- Genus: Sylvietta; Lafresnaye, 1839

Type species
- Sylvietta brachyura Lafresnaye, 1839

Species
- 9-10, see text

= Crombec =

Crombecs

Genus of birds

Sylvietta, the crombecs, is a genus of African warblers. Formerly placed in the massively paraphyletic family Sylviidae, it is now considered to belong to a newly recognized family found only in Africa, Macrosphenidae.

== Taxonomy ==
The genus Sylvietta was introduced in 1839 by the French ornithologist Frédéric de Lafresnaye with Sylvietta brachyura Lafresnaye, the Northern crombec, as the type species. The genus name is Modern Latin meaning "little warbler" or "woodland sprite", a diminutive of the genus Sylvia that had been introduced by Giovanni Antonio Scopoli in 1769.

The genus contains the following nine species:

Image	Common name	Scientific name	Distribution
	Green crombec	Sylvietta virens	West and central Africa.
	Lemon-bellied crombec	Sylvietta denti	West and central Africa.
	White-browed crombec	Sylvietta leucophrys	East-central Africa.
	Chapin's crombec	Sylvietta (leucophrys) chapini; currently considered a subspecies of the white-browed crombec, but might be a distinct species. Possibly extinct in the late 20th century	Only in the Lendu Plateau, Democratic Republic of the Congo.
	Northern crombec	Sylvietta brachyura	East, central and west Africa.
	Philippa's crombec	Sylvietta philippae	Acacia steppes of northwestern Somalia and adjacent Ethiopia.
	Red-capped crombec	Sylvietta ruficapilla	Southern central Africa.
	Red-faced crombec	Sylvietta whytii	East Africa.
	Somali crombec	Sylvietta isabellina	Dry acacia steppe of Ethiopia, Somalia, and northern Kenya.
	Long-billed crombec	Sylvietta rufescens	Southern central and south Africa.
