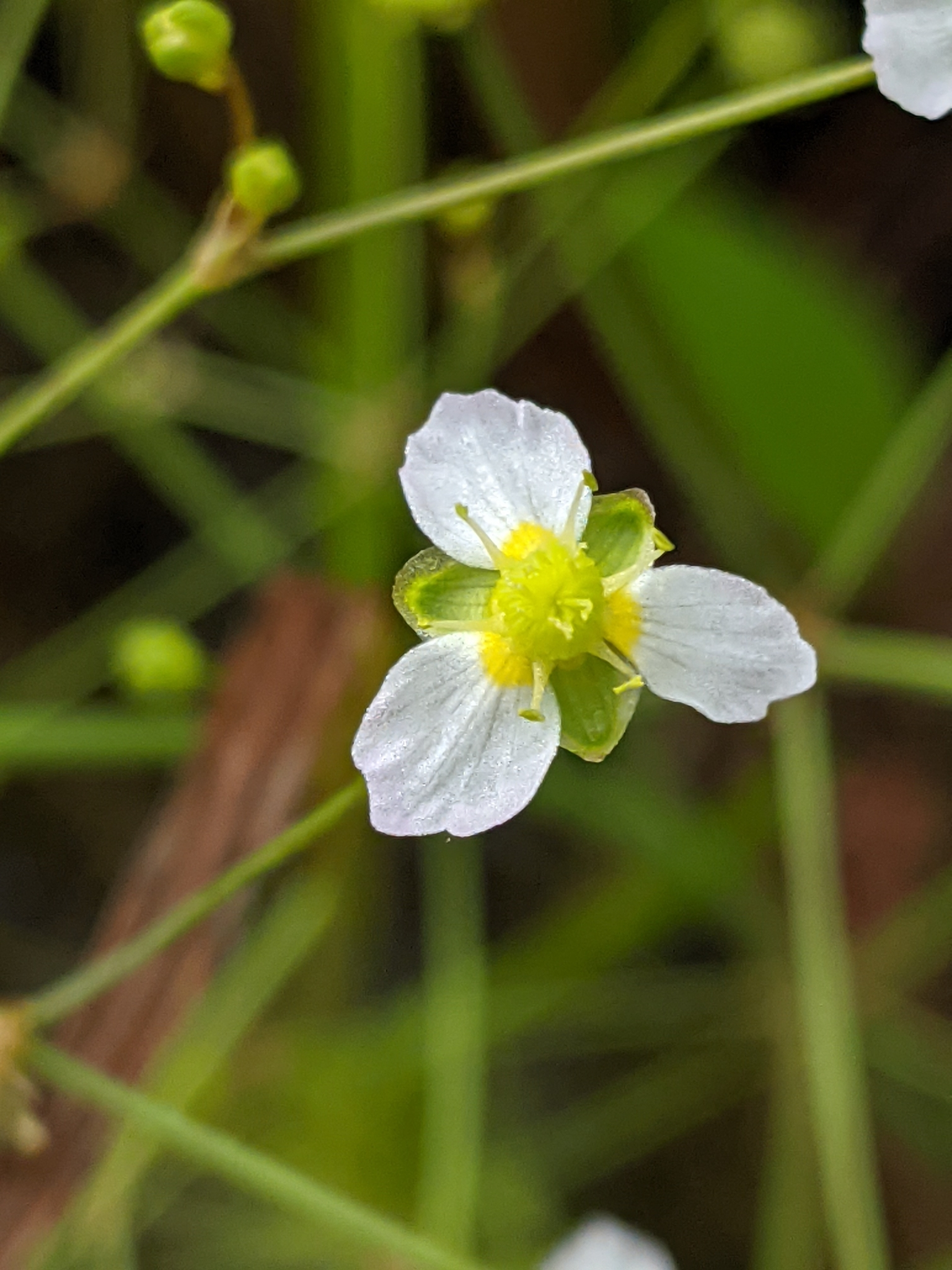

Conservation status
- Least Concern (IUCN 3.1)

Scientific classification
- Kingdom: Plantae
- Clade: Tracheophytes
- Clade: Angiosperms
- Clade: Monocots
- Order: Alismatales
- Family: Alismataceae
- Genus: Alisma
- Species: A. triviale

Binomial name
- Alisma triviale Pursh

Synonyms
- Alisma brevipes Greene; Alisma plantago-aquatica L. ssp. brevipes (Greene) Sam.; Alisma plantago-aquatica L. var. americanum Schult.; Alisma plantago-aquatica L. var. brevipes (Greene) Victorin

= Alisma triviale =

Species of aquatic plant

Alisma triviale, the northern water plantain, is a perennial semi-aquatic or aquatic plant in the water-plantain family (Alismataceae).

== Description ==
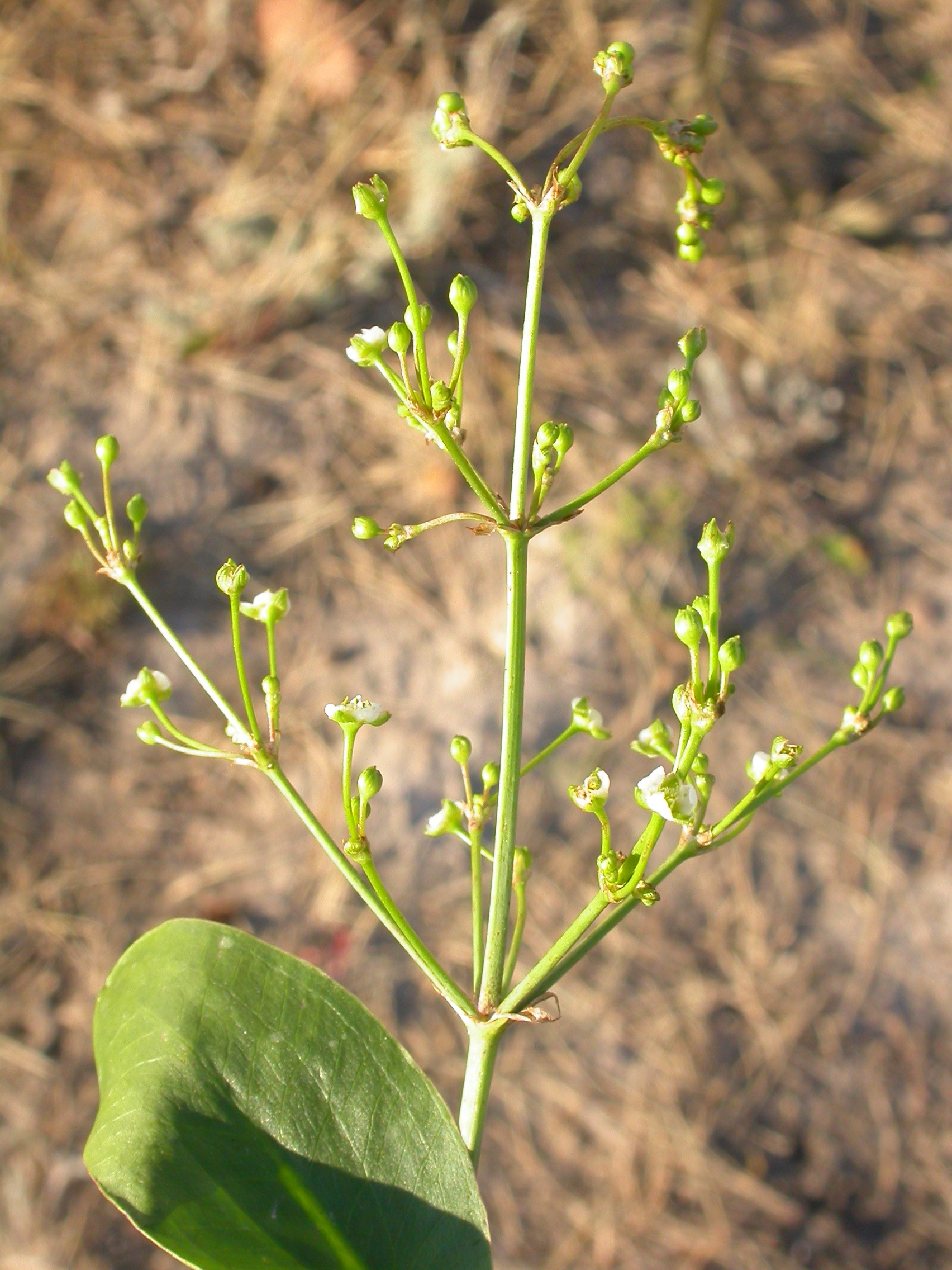
Alisma triviale

It is a perennial herb that ranges in height from 1-3 ft. Each plant has long-petioled, lanceolate and linear leaves that grow in a clump. A flowering stem rises between them. The flowers have 3 green sepals and 3 white or pink-tinged petals.

== Distribution and habitat ==
The plant is native to Canada (including the Northwest Territories), the United States (including Alaska), and Northern Mexico.

It grows in shallow water or mud.
