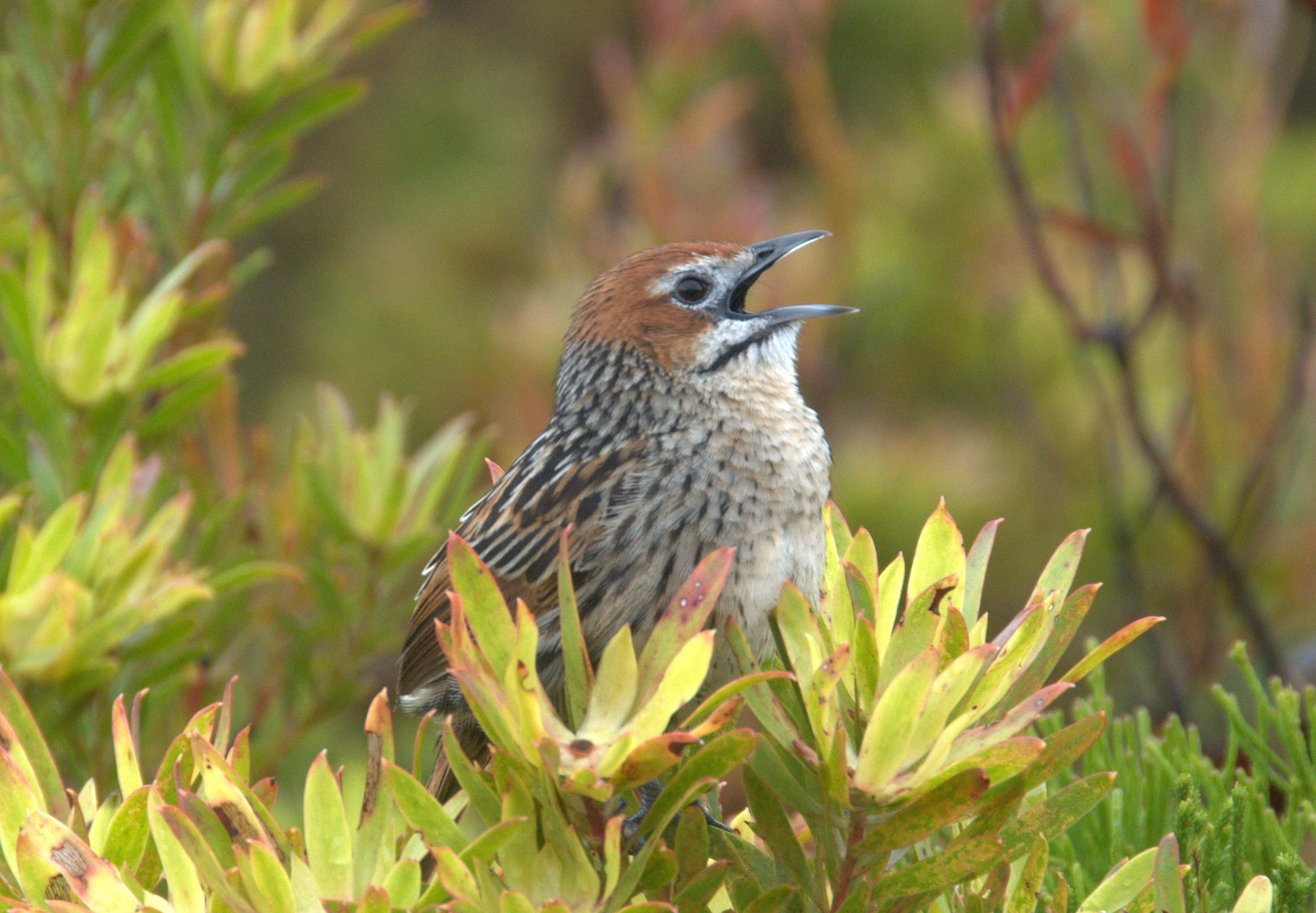

Conservation status
- Least Concern (IUCN 3.1)

Scientific classification
- Kingdom: Animalia
- Phylum: Chordata
- Class: Aves
- Order: Passeriformes
- Family: Macrosphenidae
- Genus: Sphenoeacus; Strickland, 1841
- Species: S. afer

Binomial name
- Sphenoeacus afer (Gmelin, JF, 1789)
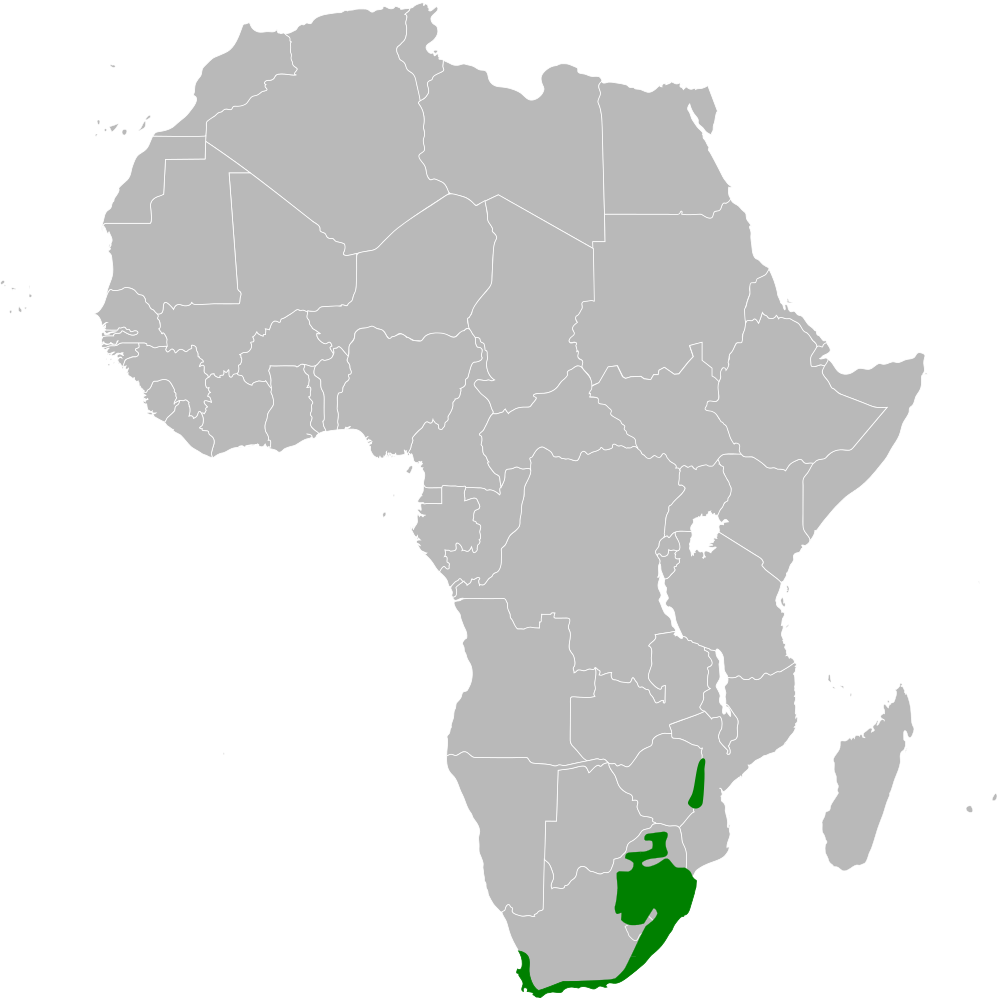

Audio
- Song recorded in KwaZulu-Natal, South Africa

= Cape grassbird =

Species of bird

The Cape grassbird or Cape grass warbler (Sphenoeacus afer) is an African warbler found in southern Africa. It is the only species placed in the genus Sphenoeacus.

== Taxonomy ==
The Cape grassbird was formally described in 1789 by the German naturalist Johann Friedrich Gmelin in his revised and expanded edition of Carl Linnaeus's Systema Naturae. He placed it with the flycatchers in the genus Muscicapa and coined the binomial name Muscicapa afra. Gmelin based his description on the "spotted yellow flycatcher" from the Cape of Good Hope that had been described in 1783 by the English ornithologist John Latham in his book A General Synopsis of Birds. The Cape grassbird is now the only species placed in the genus Sphenoeacus that was introduced in 1841 by the English naturalist Hugh Strickland. The genus name combines the Ancient Greek sphēn meaning "wedge" with oiax meaning "helm". The specific epithet afer is Latin meaning "African".

Four subspecies are recognised:

- S. a. excisus Clancey, 1973 – Eastern Highlands
- S. a. natalensis Shelley, 1882 – northeast South Africa, west Eswatini (formerly Swaziland) and north Lesotho
- S. a. intermedius Shelley, 1882 – east South Africa
- S. a. afer (Gmelin, JF, 1789) – southwest, south South Africa

The Cape grassbird was formerly placed in the family Sylviidae. Within the family Macrosphenidae the moustached grass warbler (Melocichla mentalis) and the Cape grassbird are sister species.

== Description ==
A calling bird from Table Mountain, Cape Town

The Cape grassbird is 19 to 23 cm (7.5 to 9.1 in) long and weighs 27–34 g (0.95–1.20 oz). Its crown and face sides are rufous, except for white around the eye, and it has black malar and moustachial stripes on its white throat. The upperparts are brown with heavy streaking and the long tail is a lighter brown while the underparts are whitish with blackish spotting. The sexes are similar, but the juvenile has a streaked cap and is duller than the adult. The song is jangling and musical, and the call is a nasal pheeeo.

The long, pointed, straggly tail, chestnut cap and facial stripes are diagnostic of Cape grassbird. It is much larger than any cisticola, and the heavily streaked back and the pointed tail eliminate confusion with moustached grass warbler.

== Distribution and habitat ==
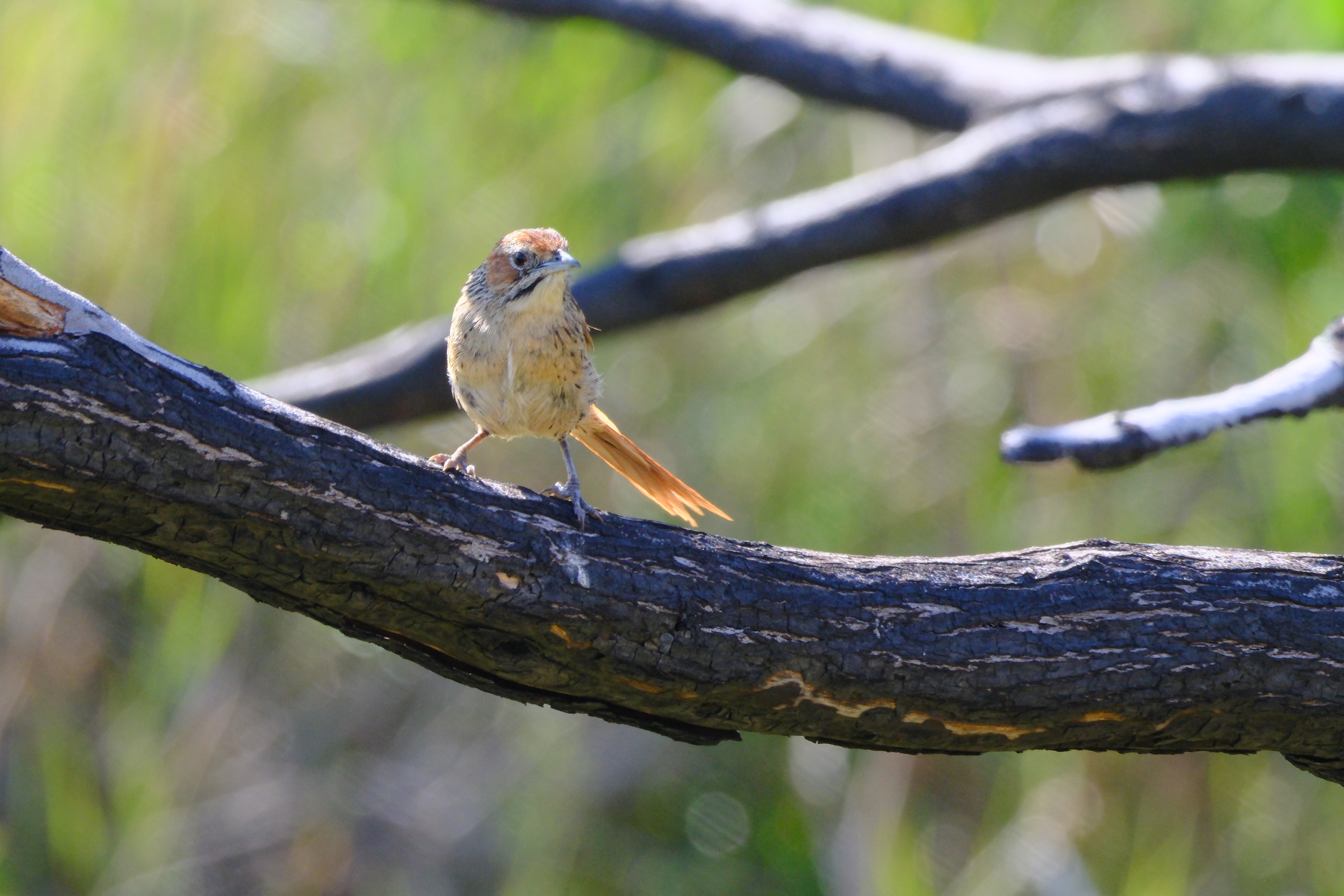
Cape grassbird (Sphenoeacus afer), Kogelberg Nature Reserve

The Cape grassbird breeds in southern Africa in South Africa, Lesotho, Mozambique and Swaziland with an isolated population in eastern Zimbabwe. It is a common species of coastal and mountain fynbos and long, rank grass on mountain slopes or in river valleys.

== Behaviour ==
The Cape grassbird builds a cup nest low in vegetation. This species is monogamous, pairing for life. Its eggs have one of the slowest rates of embryonic development amongst Southern African species.

The Cape grassbird is usually seen alone or in pairs, moving through vegetation foraging for insects and other small invertebrates.

== Conservation status ==
This common species has a large range, with an estimated extent of 390,000 square kilometres (150,000 sq mi). The population size is believed to be large, and the species is not believed to approach the thresholds for the population decline criterion of the IUCN Red List (i.e. declining more than 30% in ten years or three generations). For these reasons, the species is evaluated as of least concern.
