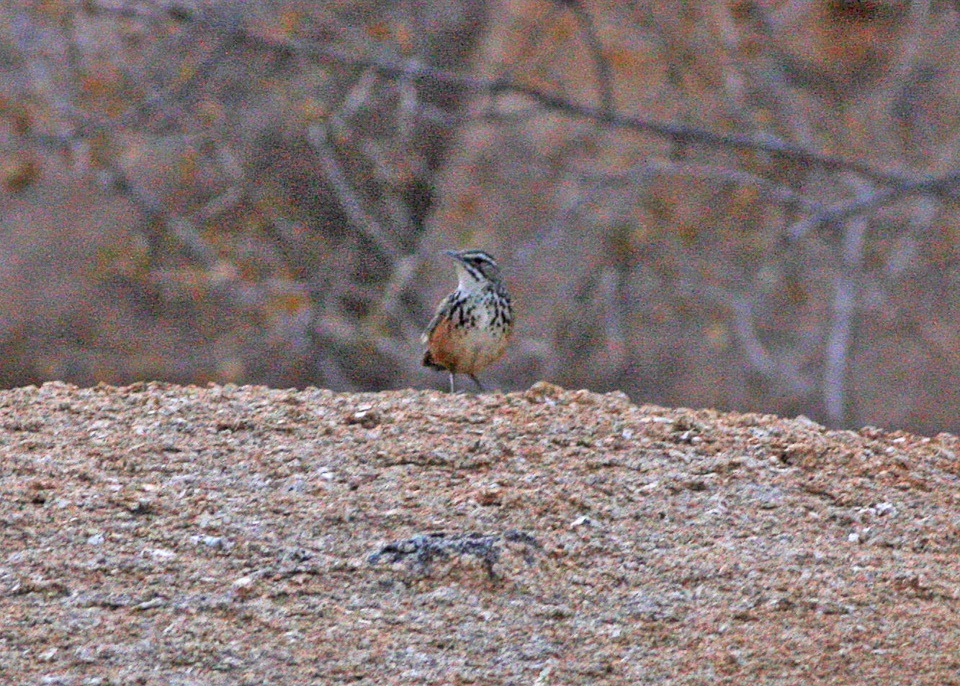

Conservation status
- Least Concern (IUCN 3.1)

Scientific classification
- Kingdom: Animalia
- Phylum: Chordata
- Class: Aves
- Order: Passeriformes
- Family: Macrosphenidae
- Genus: Achaetops; Roberts, 1922
- Species: A. pycnopygius

Binomial name
- Achaetops pycnopygius (Sclater, PL, 1853)
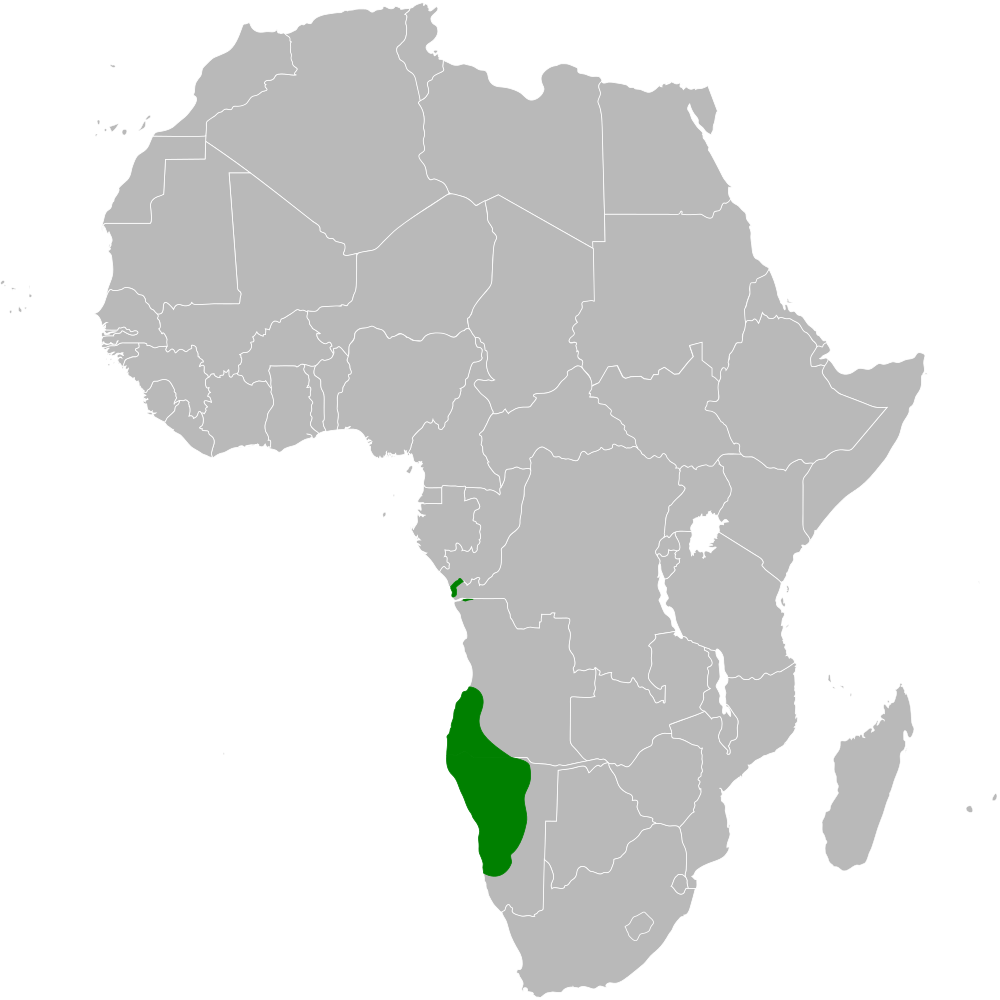

= Rockrunner =

Species of bird

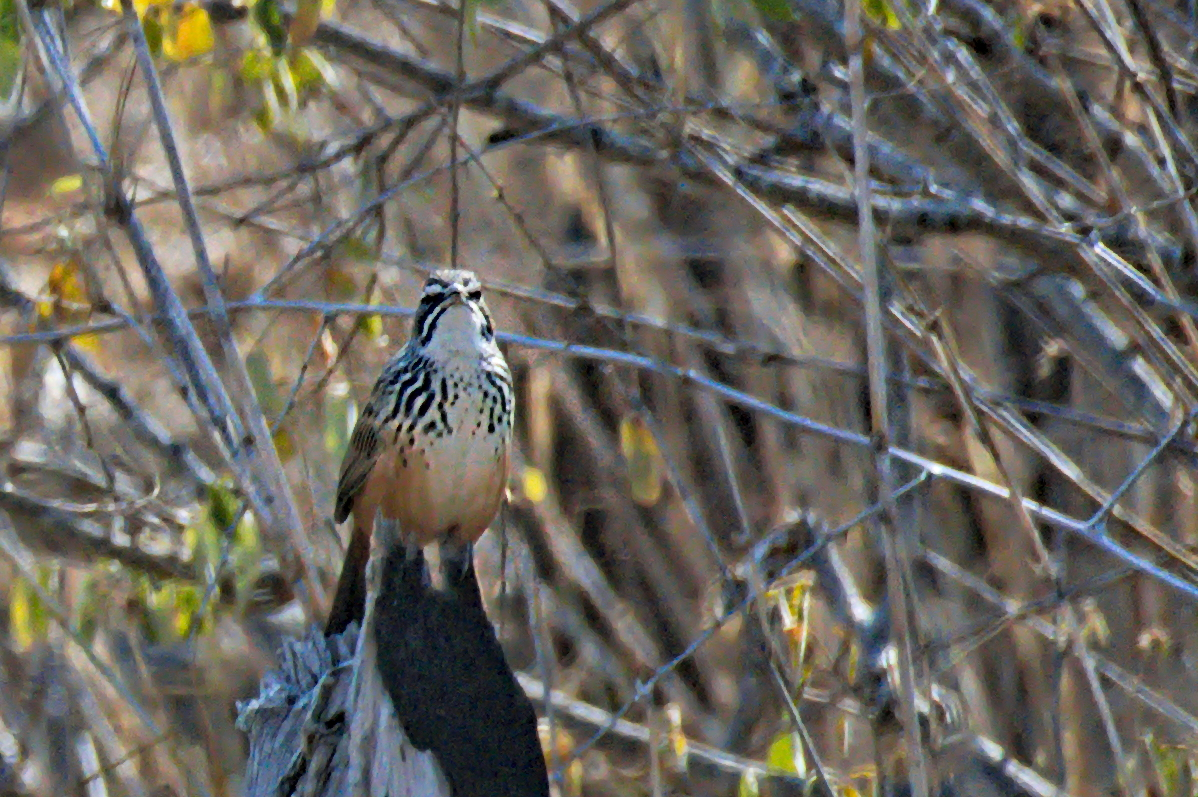
Rockrunner

The rockrunner (Achaetops pycnopygius), also known as the Damara rock-jumper, is a species of African warbler, formerly placed in the family Sylviidae. It is the only member of the monotypic genus Achaetops. It is found in Angola and Namibia.
