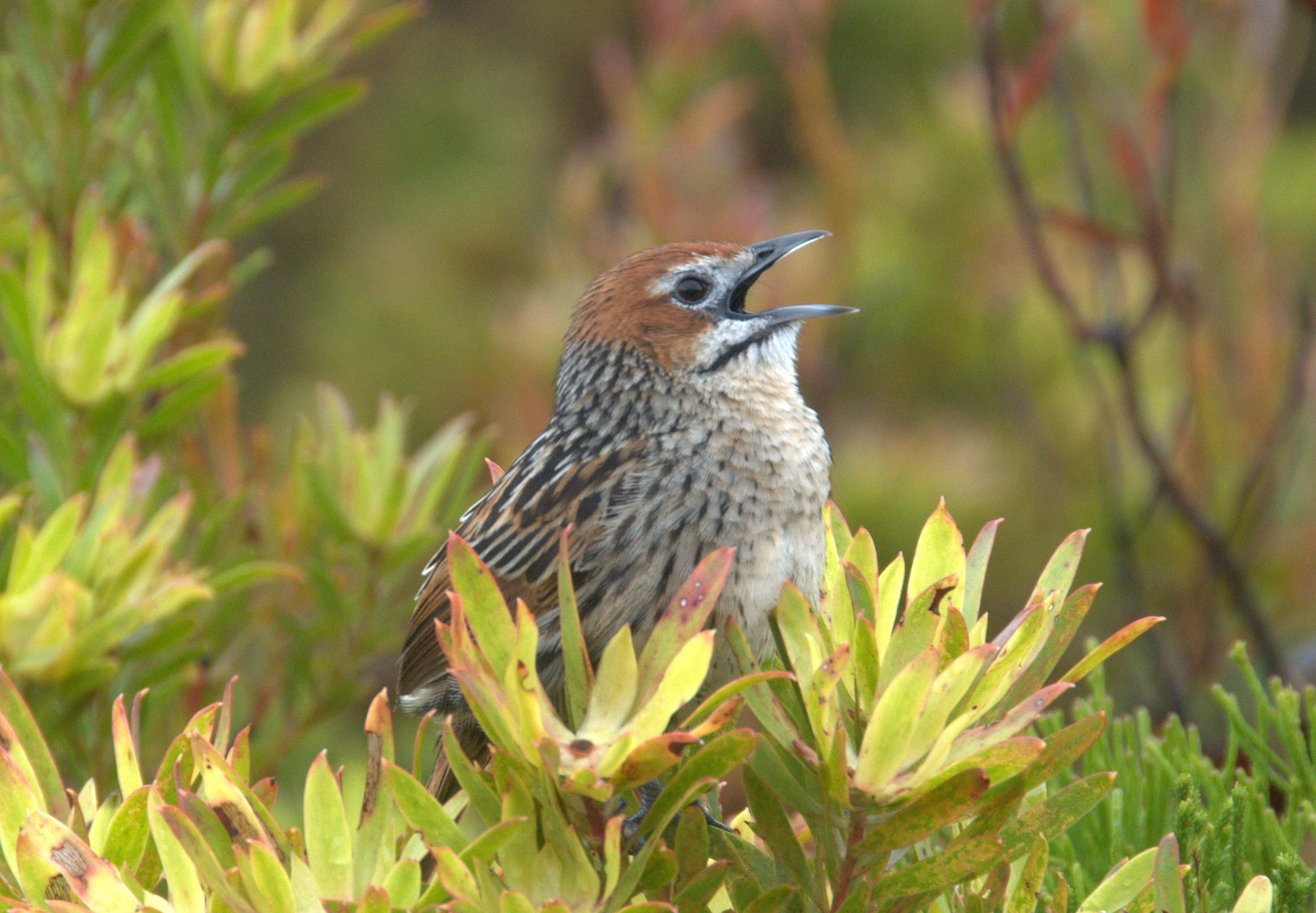
- Cape grassbird Sphenoeacus afer

Scientific classification
- Kingdom: Animalia
- Phylum: Chordata
- Class: Aves
- Order: Passeriformes
- Parvorder: Sylviida
- Family: Macrosphenidae; Wolters, 1983

Genera
- See text

= Macrosphenidae =

African warblers

Family of birds

The African warblers are a newly erected family Macrosphenidae, of African songbirds. Most of the species were formerly placed in the Old World warbler family Sylviidae, although one species, the rockrunner, was placed in the babbler family, Timaliidae. A series of molecular studies of the Old World warblers and other bird families in the superfamily Sylvioidea (which includes the larks, swallows and tits) found that the African warblers were not part of Sylviidae but were instead an early (basal) offshoot of the entire clade Sylvioidea. Some taxonomic authorities place the entire family Hyliidae here.

== Taxonomy ==
The family name (as the subfamily Macrospheninae) was introduced by the German ornithologist Hans Wolters in 1983 but was not formally defined until 2012. The family contains 18 species divided into 6 genera.

The genus level phylogeny shown below is based on a genetic study by Silke Fregin and collaborators that was published in 2012. The rockrunner Achaetops pycnopygius was not included in the study.

- Macrosphenidae
  - Macrosphenus – longbills (5 species)
  - - - Sphenoeacus – Cape grassbird
      - Melocichla – Moustached grass warbler
    - - Cryptillas – Victorin's warbler
      - Sylvietta – crombecs (9 species)

== Distribution and habitat ==
The African warblers inhabit a range of habitats in sub-Saharan Africa. These range from primary rainforest to forest edge and open woodland habitats for the longbills, wooded savanna to arid scrubland and bushland in the crombecs, rocky arid scree areas and grassland for the rockrunner, and grassland for the moustached grass warbler and Cape grassbird. The family is overwhelmingly non-migratory, although the moustached grass warbler and the northern crombec both make some localised movements in West Africa related to the rainy season.

== Description ==
The African warblers range in size from the smaller crombecs, which measure 8 cm (3.1 in) in length and weigh as little as 6.5 g (0.23 oz), to the Cape grassbird, which measures 19–23 cm (7.5–9.1 in) in length and the moustached grass warbler which weighs 29–40 g (1.0–1.4 oz). There is considerable difference in appearance between the genera; for example, the two grass warblers and Victorin's warbler possess long graduated tails, whereas the crombecs have tails which barely extend beyond the tail coverts and folded wings.

== Behaviour ==
The African warblers are insect eaters, and take a range of insect prey. The longbills and crombecs feed in the canopy and in bushes, either as singles or pairs and sometimes in small groups, whereas the other species are more terrestrial in their habits. Where two species co-occur, such as the red-faced crombec and the long-billed crombec over parts of their range, niche partitioning occurs, with one species feeding in the canopy and the other species feeding lower down in the bushes and trees. Some species of both crombec and longbill have been reported to join mixed-species feeding flocks.

Breeding is seasonal and usually timed to coincide with the end of the dry season and beginning of the rainy season; in species with large ranges this can lead to considerable variation as to the exact timing. Information is lacking in many species, but for those that have been studied the African warblers are territorial and monogamous. Nest design varies within the family; the crombecs construct deep pocket-shaped nests suspended from a branch; whereas the Victorin's warbler, Cape grassbird and moustached grass warbler construct cup nests weaved from grass.

== Status and conservation ==
The majority of this family are considered to be fairly secure and are listed by the IUCN as least concern. One species, the Pulitzer's longbill, is listed as endangered. This species is endemic to forests found on escarpments in western Angola, a habitat threatened by forest clearance and the spread of slash-and-burn agriculture, and the population is thought to number less than a thousand and is still declining. Another potential concern is Chapin's crombec, which is either a species or a subspecies of the white-browed crombec. The status of this bird is uncertain, as conflict has prevented surveys in its range, but it may be extinct.

== Species ==
Image	Genus	Living species
	Sylvietta Lafresnaye, 1839	Green crombec, Sylvietta virens; Lemon-bellied crombec, Sylvietta denti; White-browed crombec, Sylvietta leucophrys; Chapin's crombec, Sylvietta (leucophrys) chapini – currently considered a subspecies of the white-browed crombec, but might be a distinct species. Possibly extinct in the late 20th century.; Northern crombec, Sylvietta brachyura; Philippa's crombec, Sylvietta philippae; Red-capped crombec, Sylvietta ruficapilla; Red-faced crombec, Sylvietta whytii; Somali crombec, Sylvietta isabellina; Long-billed crombec, Sylvietta rufescens
	Melocichla Hartlaub, 1857	Moustached grass warbler, Melocichla mentalis
	Achaetops Roberts, 1922	Rockrunner, Achaetops pycnopygius
	Sphenoeacus Strickland, 1841	Cape grassbird, Sphenoeacus afer
	Cryptillas Oberholser, 1899 – formerly Bradypterus (now Locustellidae)	Victorin's warbler, Cryptillas victorini
	Macrosphenus Cassin, 1859	Kemp's longbill, Macrosphenus kempi; Yellow longbill, Macrosphenus flavicans; Grey longbill, Macrosphenus concolor; Pulitzer's longbill, Macrosphenus pulitzeri; Kretschmer's longbill, Macrosphenus kretschmeri
