= Philippa's crombec =

Conservation status
- Data Deficient (IUCN 3.1)

Scientific classification
- Kingdom: Animalia
- Phylum: Chordata
- Class: Aves
- Order: Passeriformes
- Family: Macrosphenidae
- Genus: Sylvietta
- Species: S. philippae

Binomial name
- Sylvietta philippae Williams, JG, 1955
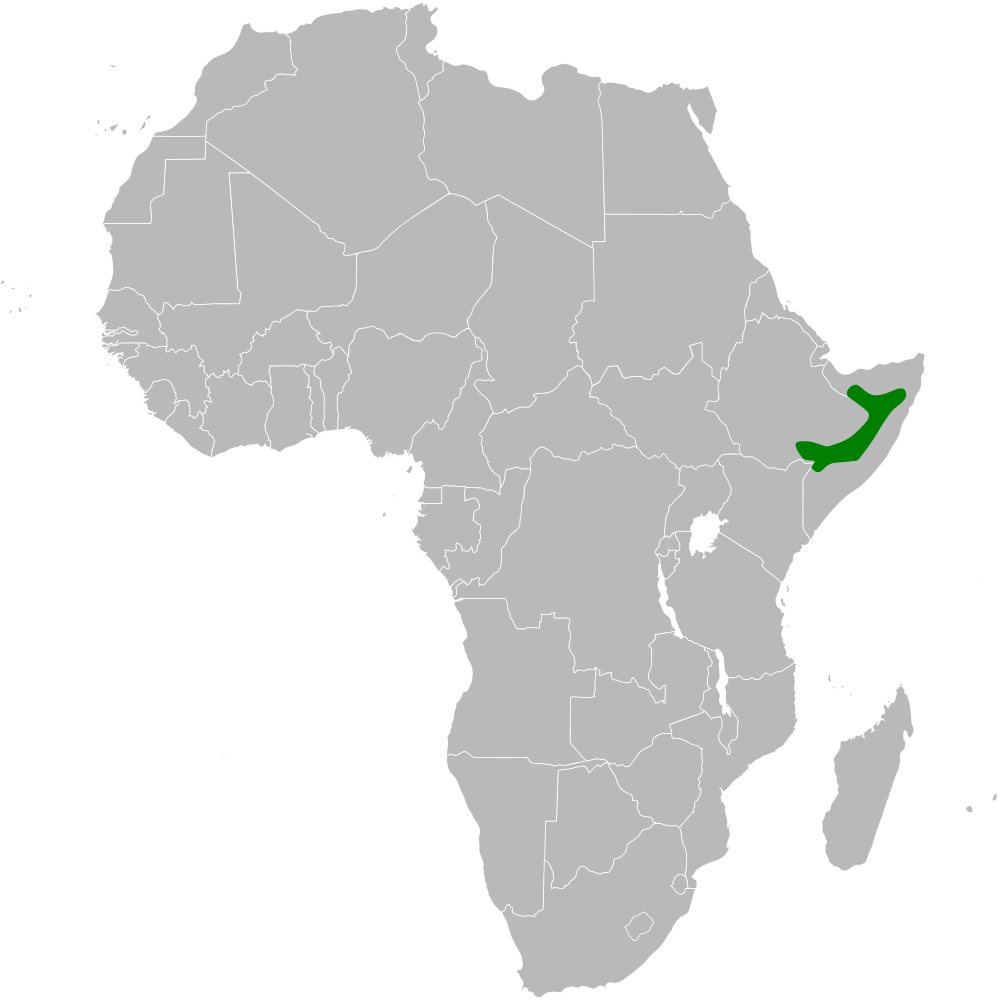

Species of bird

Philippa's crombec (Sylvietta philippae), also known as the short-billed crombec, is a species of African warbler, formerly placed in the family Sylviidae. It is found in Ethiopia and Somalia. Its natural habitat is dry savanna.

== Description ==
The species is about 8 cm, weighing 9-10 g. Its upper parts are greyish in colour, with a thin white supercilium and throat. The lower parts are yellowish. The bill is noticeably short compared to other species of Sylvietta.
