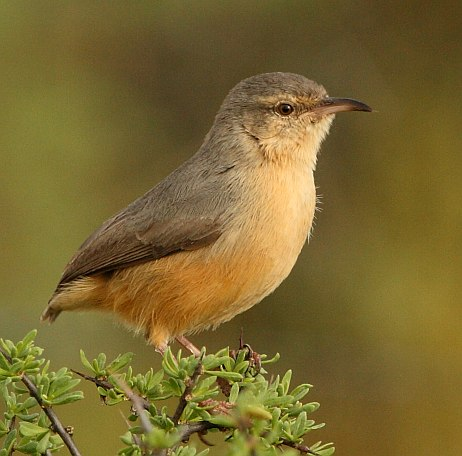
- The nominate subspecies in South Africa

Conservation status
- Least Concern (IUCN 3.1)

Scientific classification
- Kingdom: Animalia
- Phylum: Chordata
- Class: Aves
- Order: Passeriformes
- Family: Macrosphenidae
- Genus: Sylvietta
- Species: S. rufescens

Binomial name
- Sylvietta rufescens (Vieillot, 1817)

= Long-billed crombec =

Species of bird

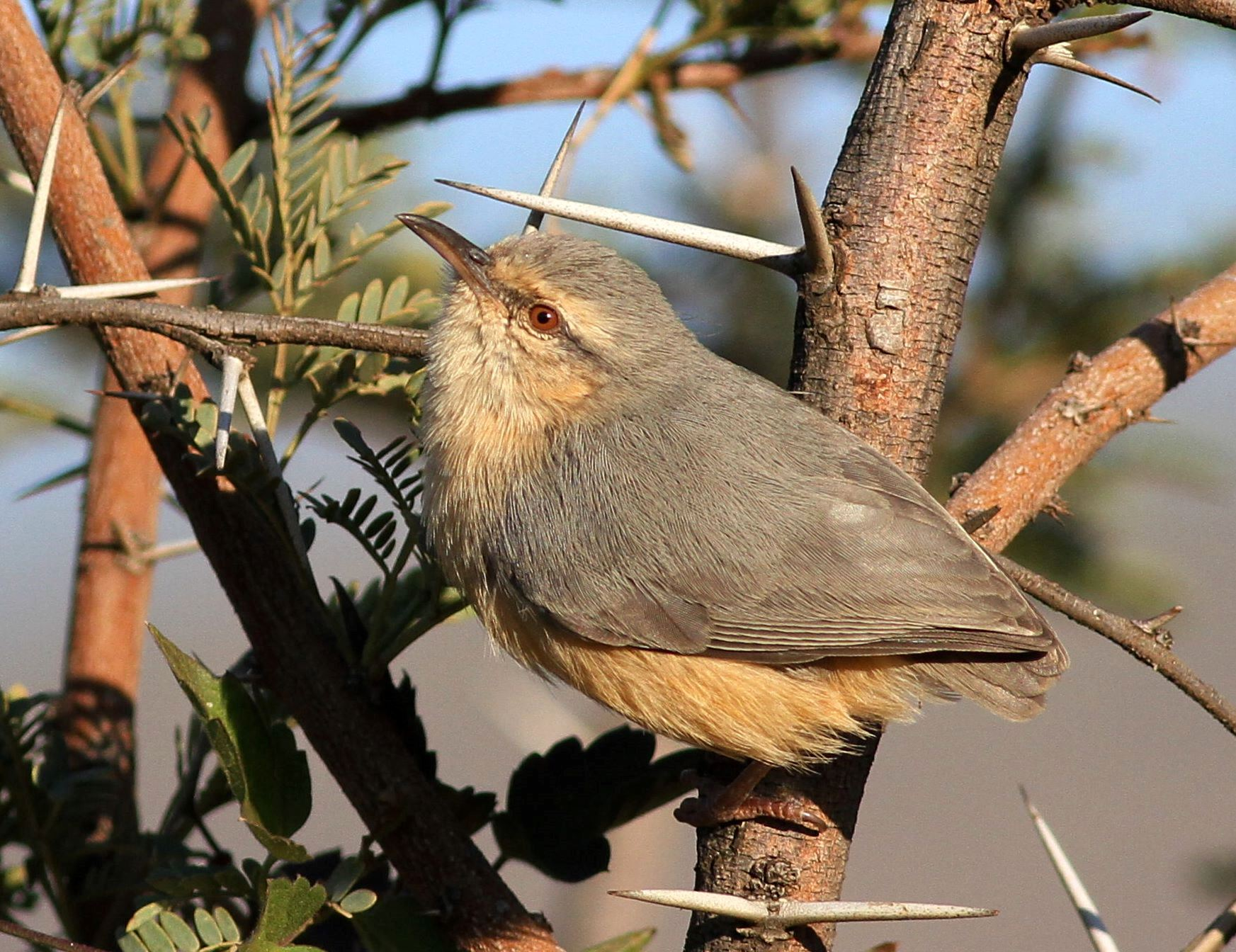
S. rufescens flecki foraging in an Acacia tree, South Africa

The long-billed crombec or Cape crombec (Sylvietta rufescens) is an African warbler.

The long-billed crombec breeds in southern Africa from the Democratic Republic of the Congo, Zambia and Tanzania southwards to South Africa.

This is a common species in fynbos, open woodland, savannah and dry Acacia scrub.

== Description ==
The long-billed crombec is a small, nearly tailless bird 12 cm long and weighing around 16 g. Its upperparts are brownish grey-brown, and there is a pale grey supercilium, separated from the whitish throat by a dark eye stripe. The whitish breast shades into the buff belly. The long slightly curved bill is blackish.

The sexes are similar, and the juvenile resembles the adult. The call is a variable series of trilled notes including trreee-rriiit trreee-rriiit and a harsh pttt.

== Behaviour ==
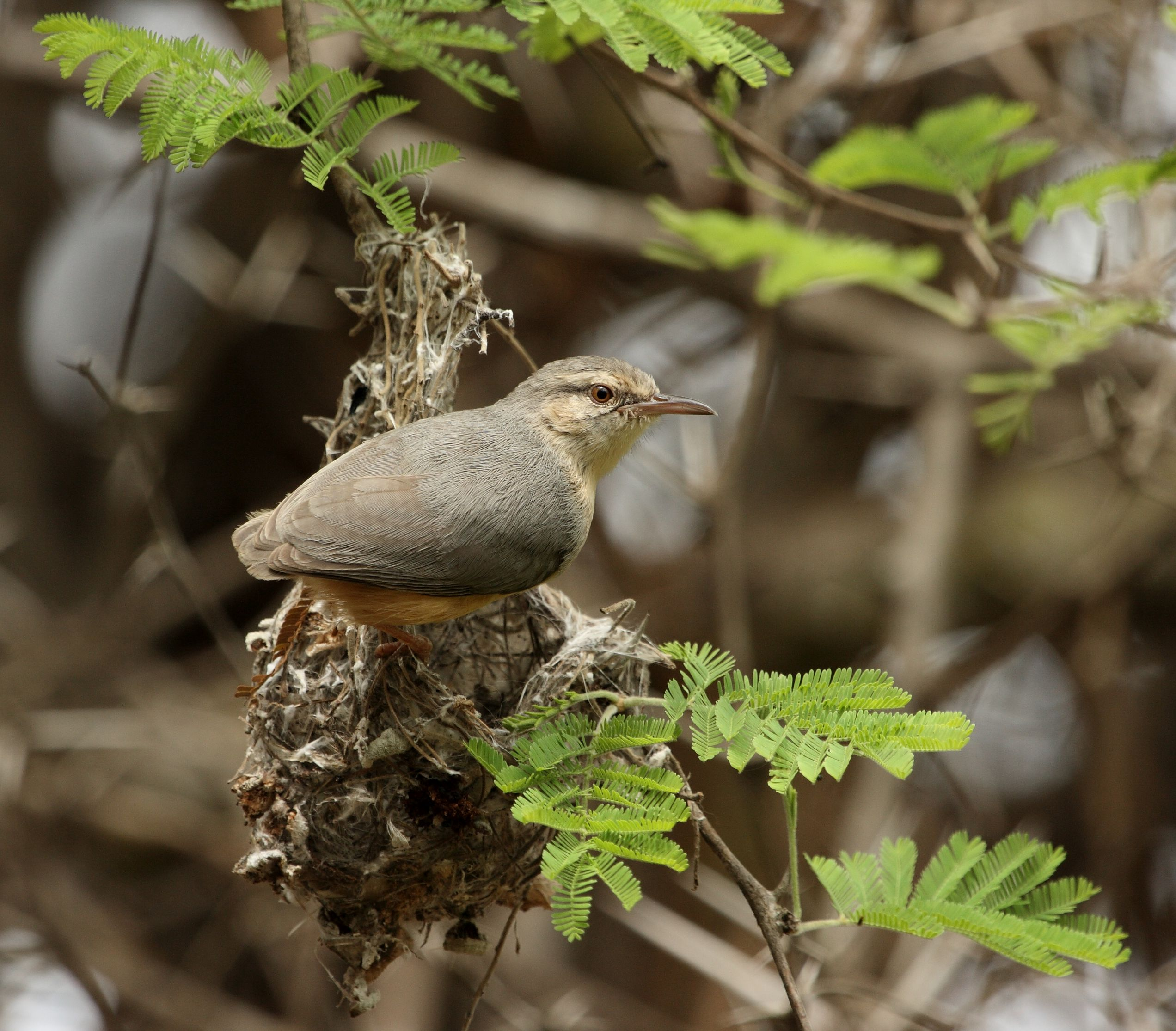
A long-billed crombec (S. rufescens pallida) building a nest in sicklebush

The long-billed crombec's nest is a large, hanging bag of grasses, spider webs, and plant fibres, which is attached to the lower limbs of a tree, often an Acacia. The one to three white eggs are incubated for two weeks to hatching, and the chicks are fed by both parents for another two weeks to fledging. This territorial species is monogamous, pairing for life.

This bird is usually seen alone, in pairs, or in family groups as it forages methodically from the bottom to the top of bushes and trees for insects and grass seeds. It will join mixed-species feeding flocks.

It moves between trees with a bouncy flight.

== Conservation status ==
This common species has a large range, with an estimated extent of 4,500,000 km². The population size is believed to be large, and the species is not believed to approach the thresholds for the population decline criterion of the IUCN Red List (i.e. declining more than 30% in ten years or three generations). For these reasons, the species is evaluated as least concern.
