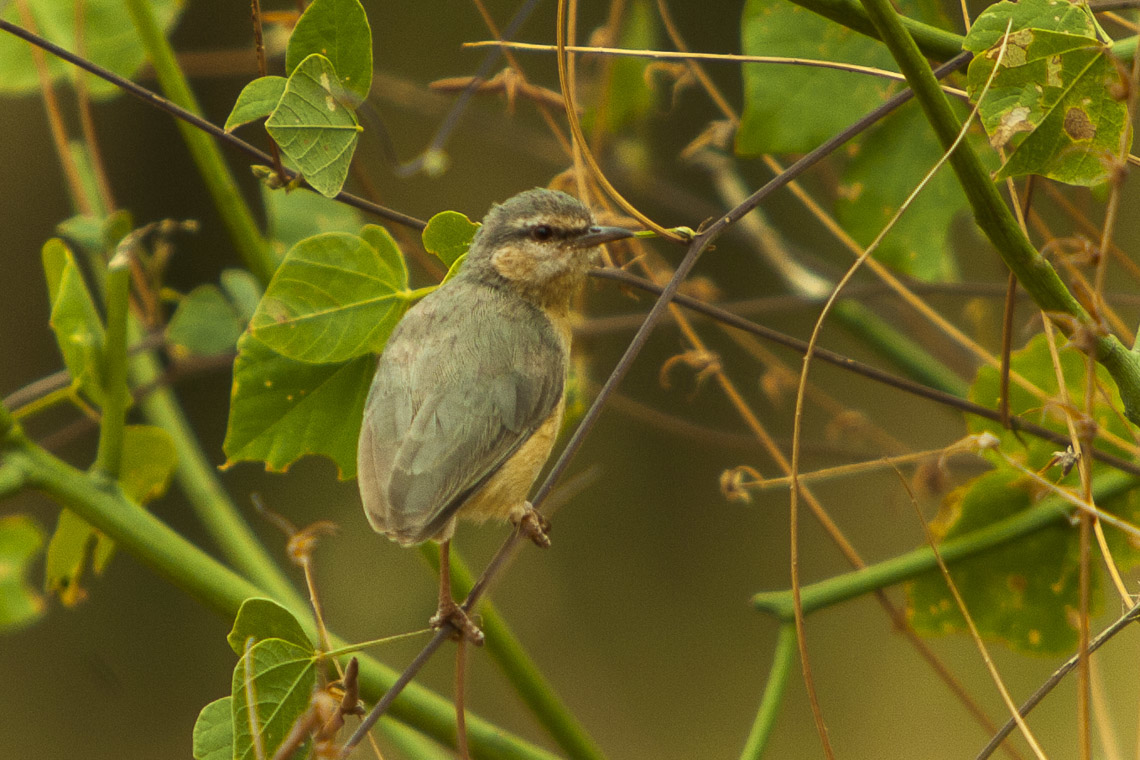

Conservation status
- Least Concern (IUCN 3.1)

Scientific classification
- Kingdom: Animalia
- Phylum: Chordata
- Class: Aves
- Order: Passeriformes
- Family: Macrosphenidae
- Genus: Sylvietta
- Species: S. brachyura

Binomial name
- Sylvietta brachyura Lafresnaye, 1839
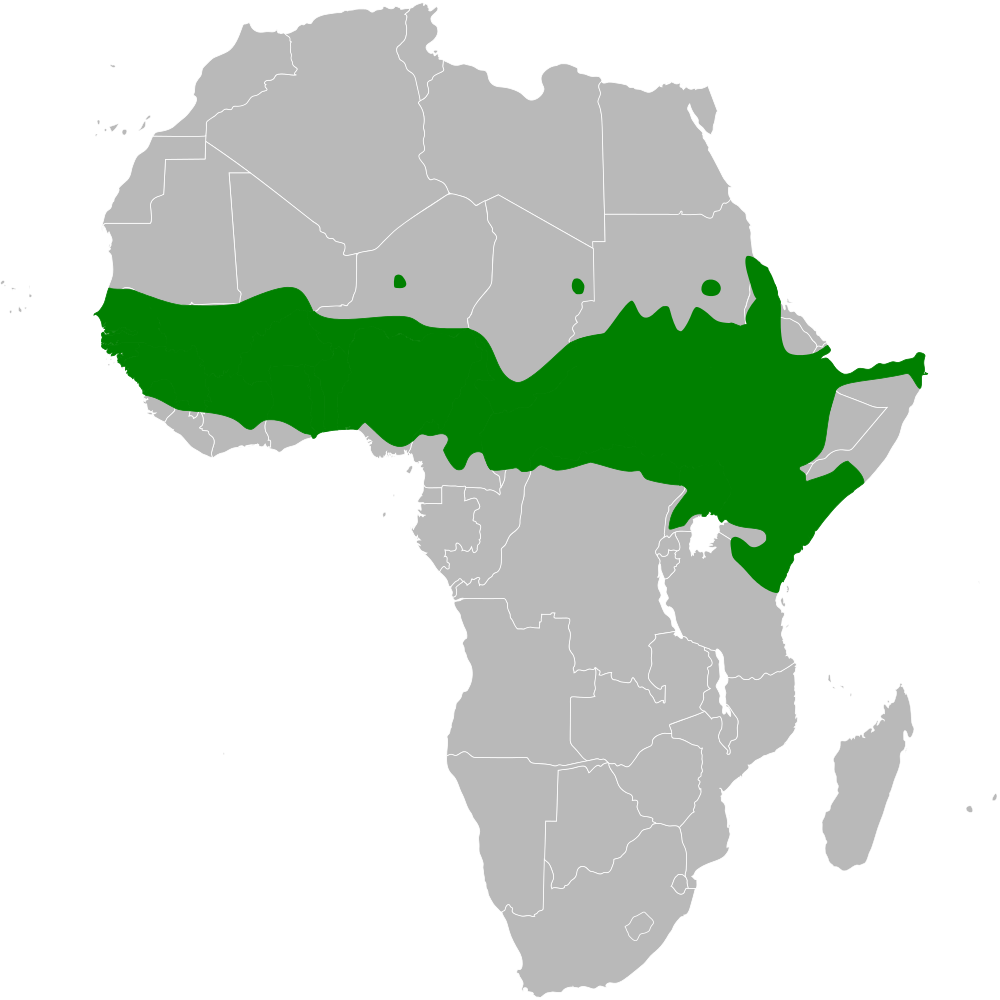

= Northern crombec =

Species of bird

The northern crombec (Sylvietta brachyura) is a species of African warbler, formerly placed in the family Sylviidae. It is found in Benin, Burkina Faso, Cameroon, Central African Republic, Chad, Democratic Republic of the Congo, Ivory Coast, Djibouti, Eritrea, Ethiopia, Gambia, Ghana, Guinea, Guinea-Bissau, Kenya, Mali, Mauritania, Niger, Nigeria, Senegal, Sierra Leone, Somalia, Sudan, Tanzania, Togo, and Uganda. Its natural habitat is dry savanna.

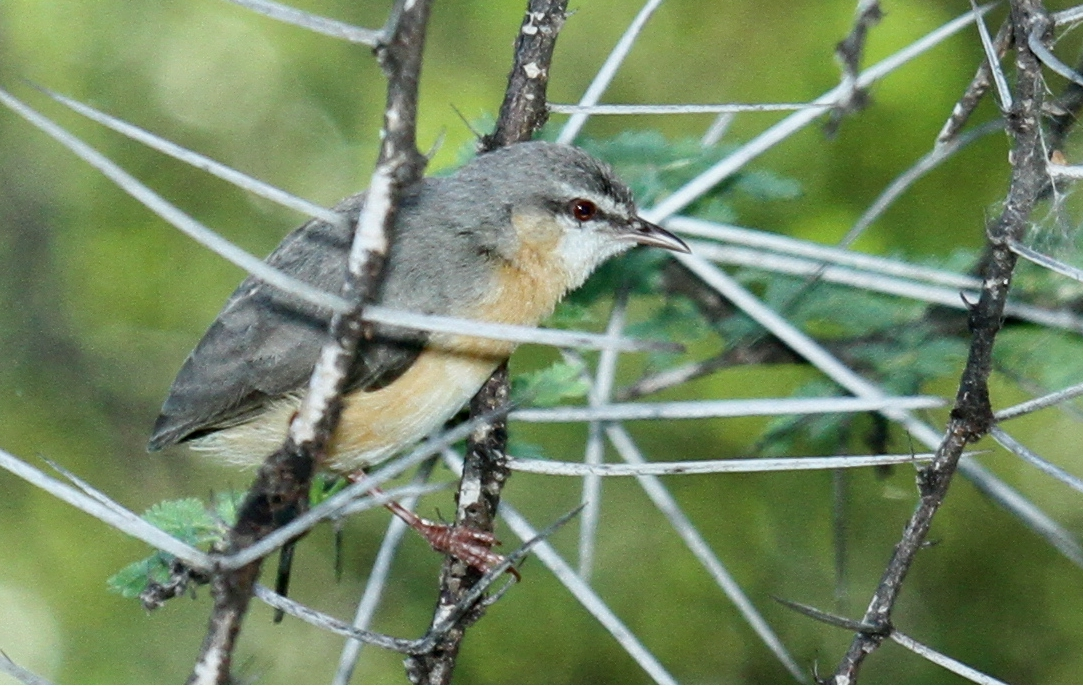
Near Lake Baringo - Kenya
