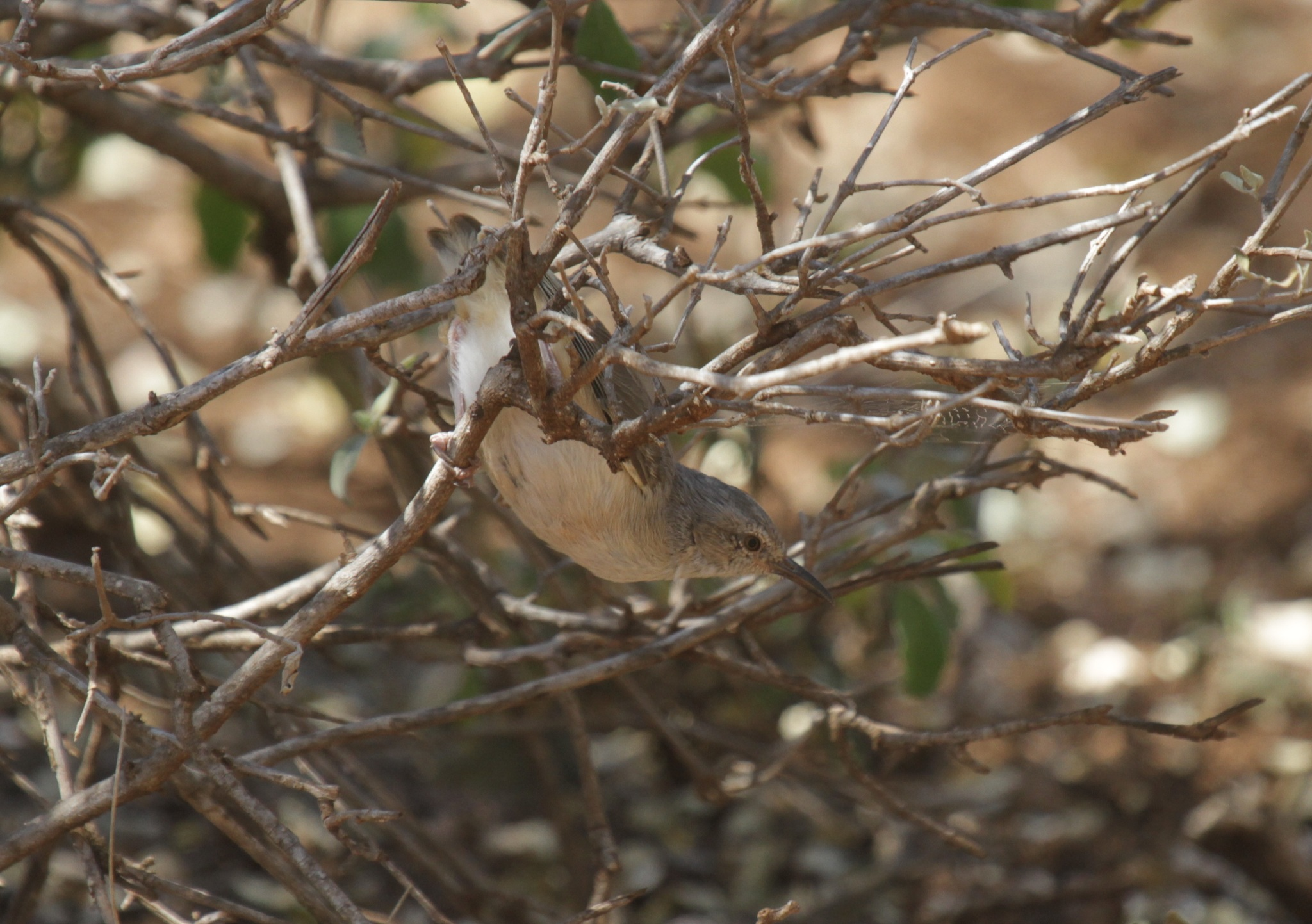

Conservation status
- Least Concern (IUCN 3.1)

Scientific classification
- Kingdom: Animalia
- Phylum: Chordata
- Class: Aves
- Order: Passeriformes
- Family: Macrosphenidae
- Genus: Sylvietta
- Species: S. isabellina

Binomial name
- Sylvietta isabellina Elliot, 1897

= Somali crombec =

Species of bird

The Somali crombec (Sylvietta isabellina) is a species of African warbler, formerly placed in the family Sylviidae. It is found in Ethiopia, Kenya, Somalia, and Tanzania. Its natural habitat is subtropical or tropical dry shrubland.

A subspecies gaekwari described by R.B. Sharpe and named after the Maharaja of Baroda Sayajirao Gaekwad III is considered to be indistinguishable from the nominate form.
