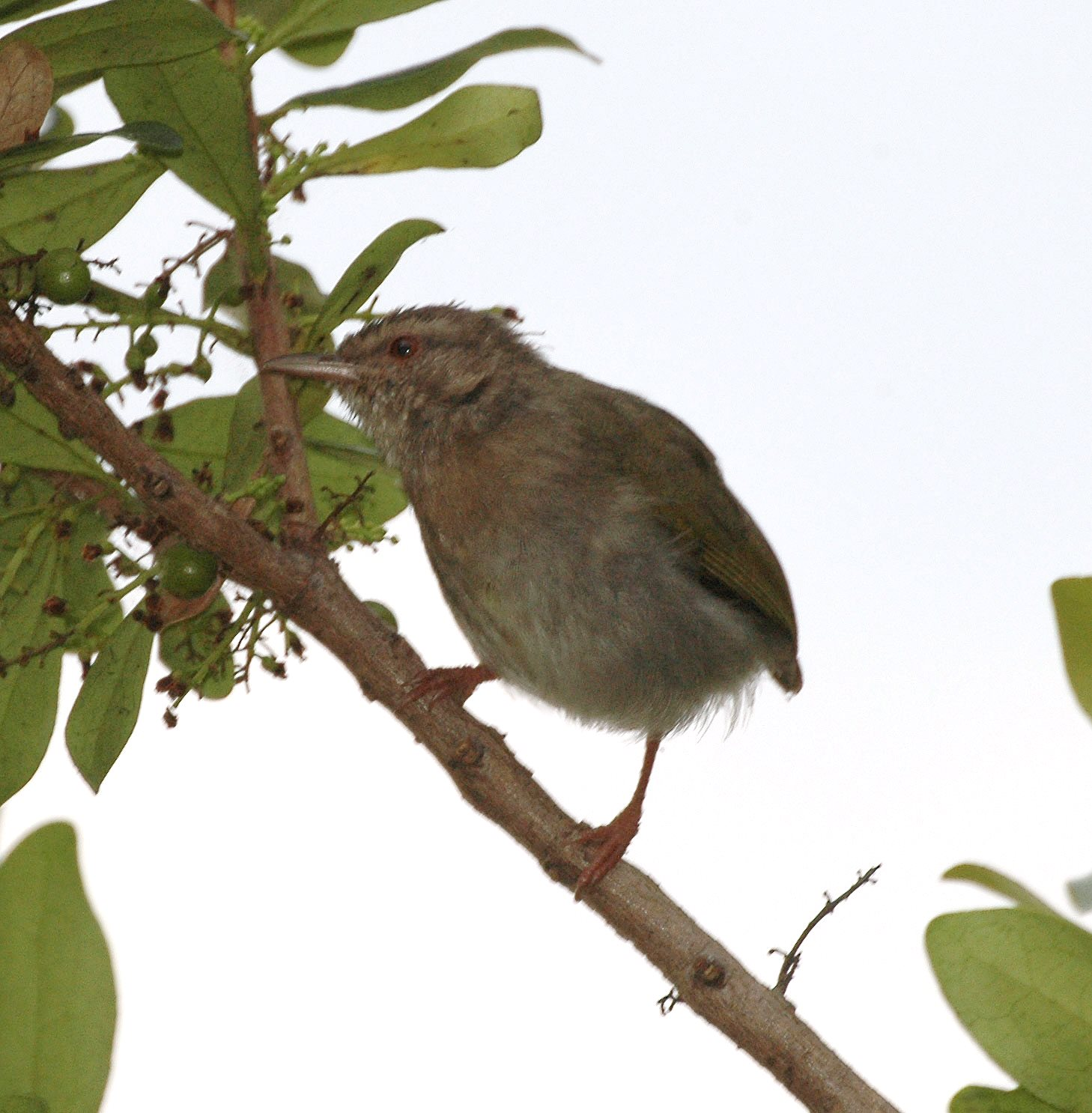

Conservation status
- Least Concern (IUCN 3.1)

Scientific classification
- Kingdom: Animalia
- Phylum: Chordata
- Class: Aves
- Order: Passeriformes
- Family: Macrosphenidae
- Genus: Sylvietta
- Species: S. virens

Binomial name
- Sylvietta virens Cassin, 1859
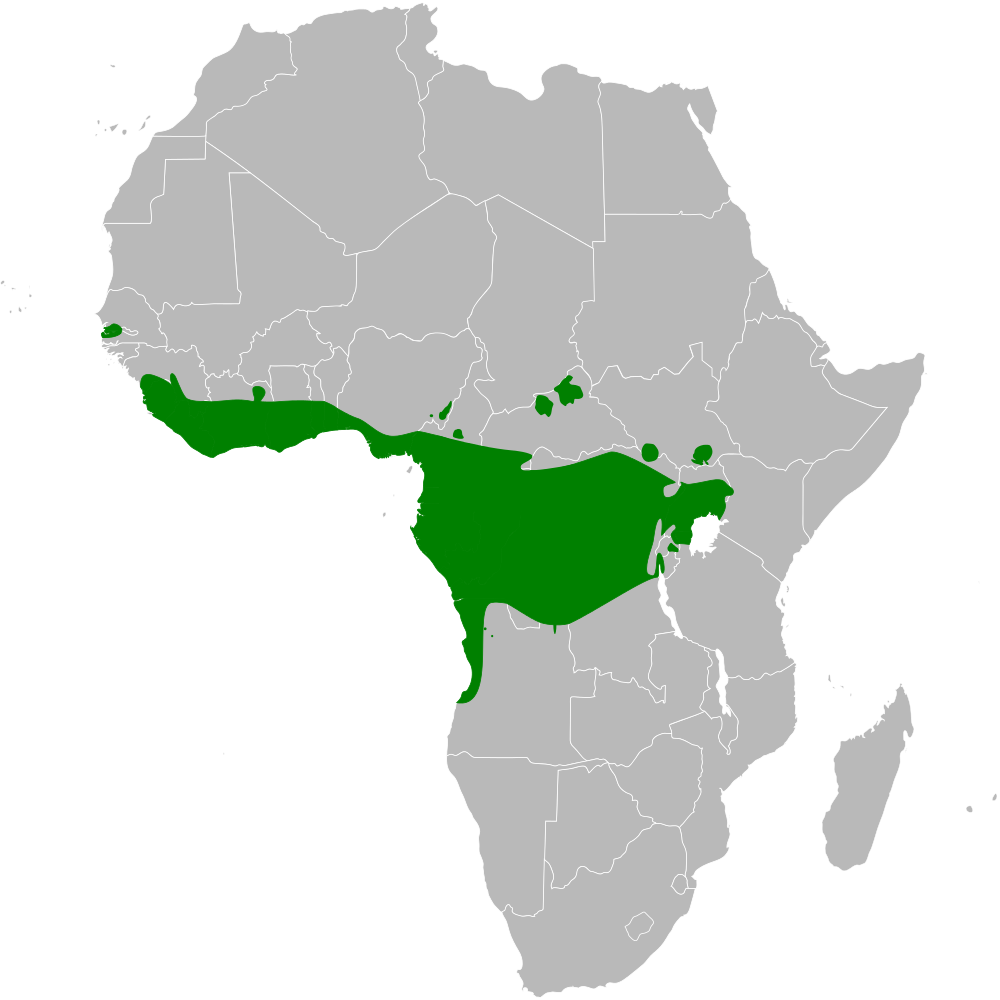

= Green crombec =

Species of bird

The green crombec (Sylvietta virens) is a species of African warbler, formerly placed in the family Sylviidae. It is widespread across the African tropical rainforest. Its natural habitats are subtropical or tropical moist lowland forests and subtropical or tropical moist shrubland.
