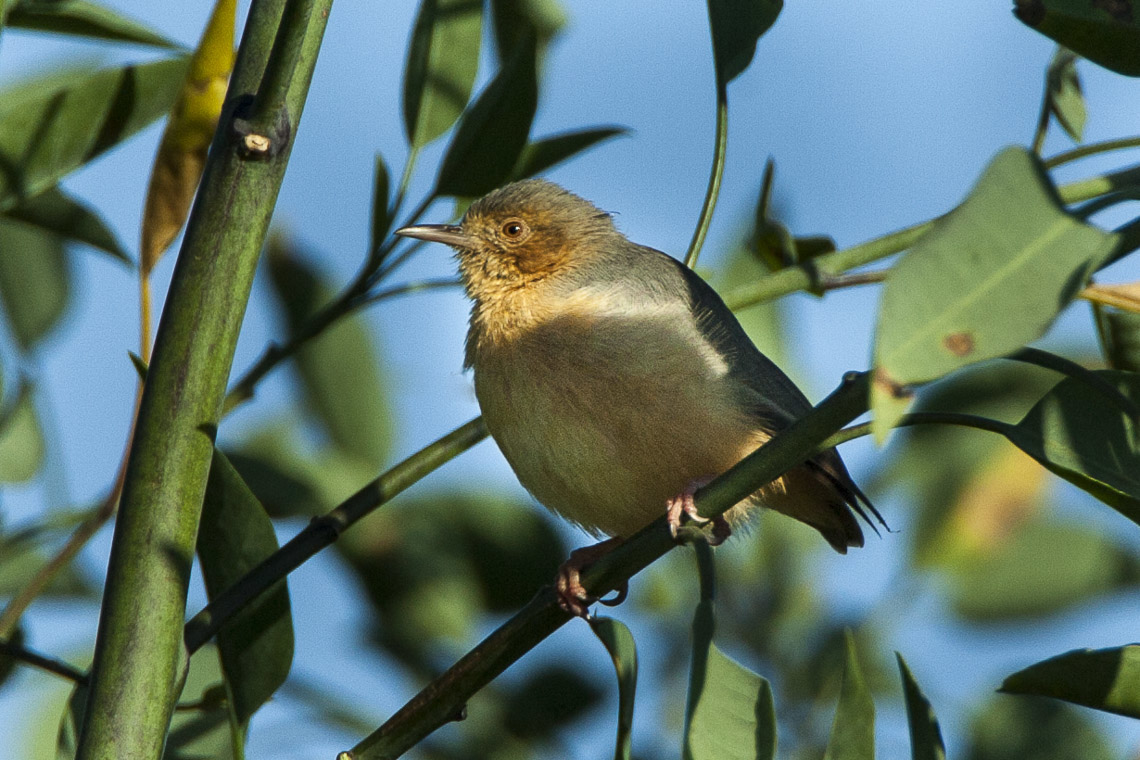

Conservation status
- Least Concern (IUCN 3.1)

Scientific classification
- Kingdom: Animalia
- Phylum: Chordata
- Class: Aves
- Order: Passeriformes
- Family: Macrosphenidae
- Genus: Sylvietta
- Species: S. whytii

Binomial name
- Sylvietta whytii Shelley, 1894
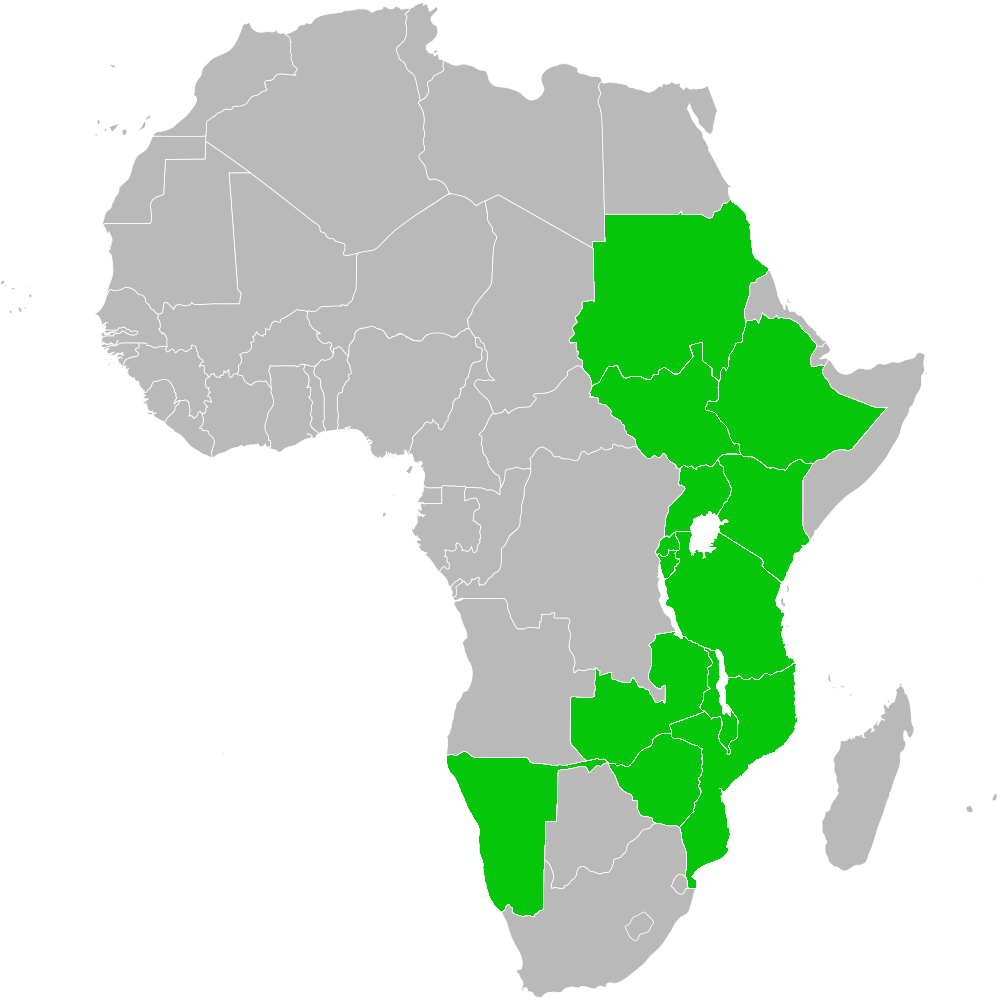

Audio
- Song recorded in Kongelai, Kenya

= Red-faced crombec =

Species of bird

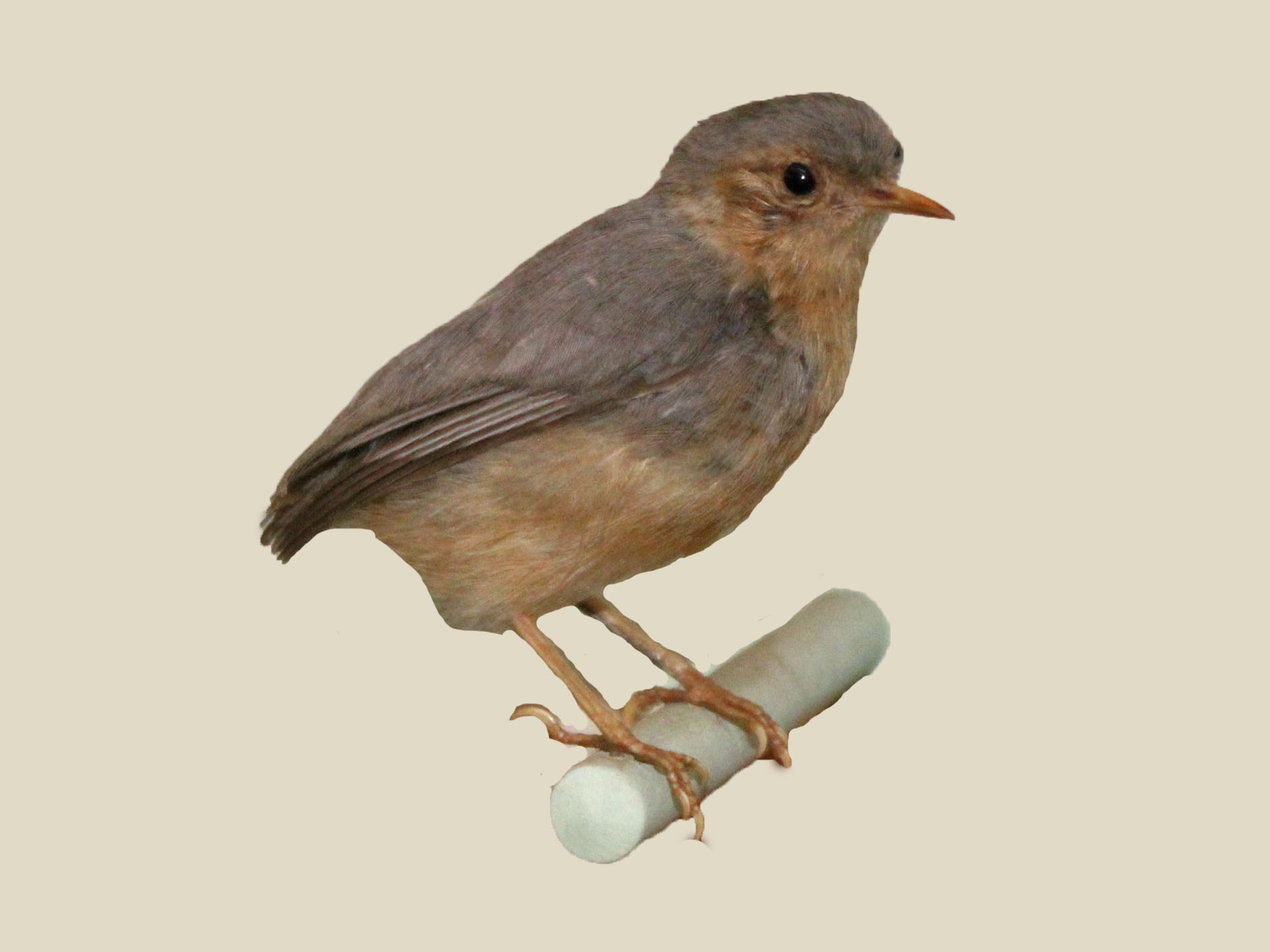
Specimen at Nairobi National Museum

The red-faced crombec (Sylvietta whytii) is a species of African warbler, formerly placed in the family Sylviidae. It is found in Burundi, Ethiopia, Kenya, Malawi, Mozambique, Namibia, Rwanda, South Sudan, Tanzania, Uganda, and Zimbabwe. Its natural habitats are subtropical or tropical dry forests, subtropical or tropical moist montane forests, and subtropical or tropical dry shrubland.
