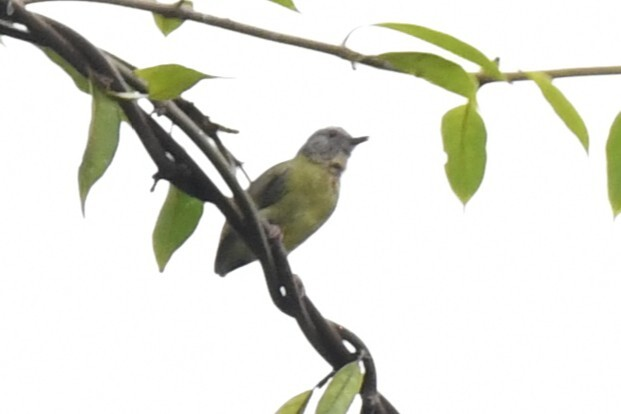

Conservation status
- Least Concern (IUCN 3.1)

Scientific classification
- Kingdom: Animalia
- Phylum: Chordata
- Class: Aves
- Order: Passeriformes
- Family: Macrosphenidae
- Genus: Sylvietta
- Species: S. denti

Binomial name
- Sylvietta denti Ogilvie-Grant, 1906
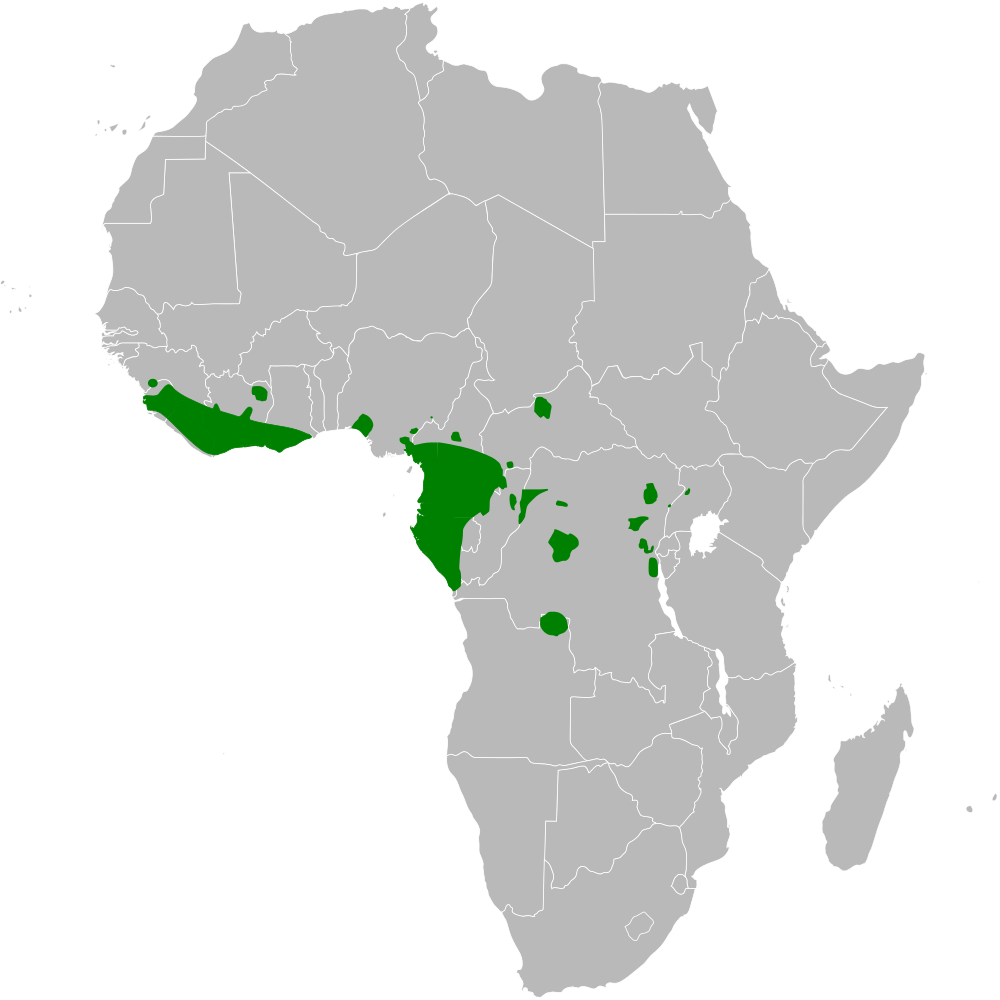

= Lemon-bellied crombec =

Species of bird

The lemon-bellied crombec (Sylvietta denti) is a species of African warbler, formerly placed in the family Sylviidae. It is sparsely present throughout the African tropical rainforest. Its natural habitats are subtropical or tropical moist lowland forests and subtropical or tropical moist shrubland.
