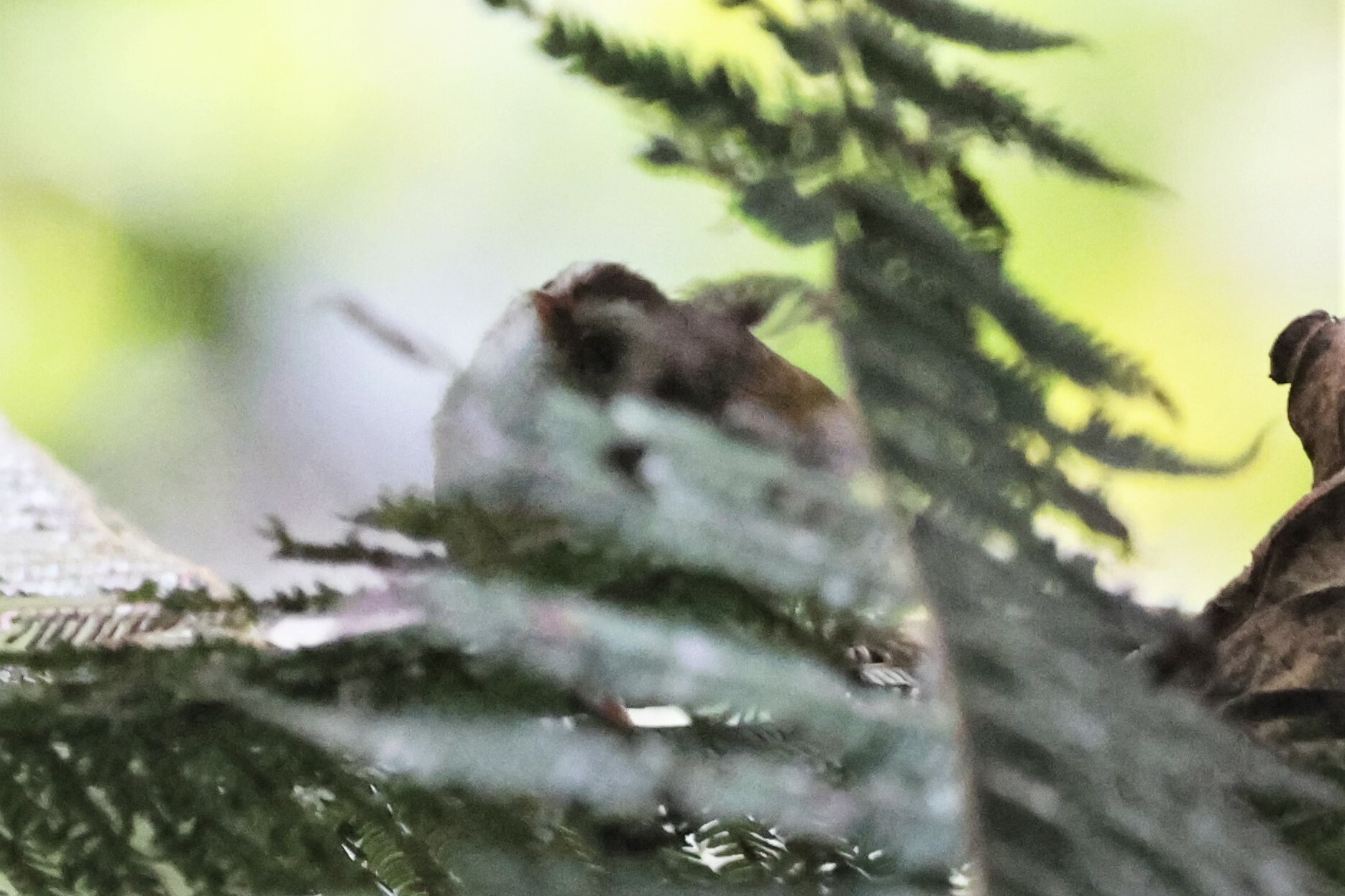

Conservation status
- Least Concern (IUCN 3.1)

Scientific classification
- Kingdom: Animalia
- Phylum: Chordata
- Class: Aves
- Order: Passeriformes
- Family: Macrosphenidae
- Genus: Sylvietta
- Species: S. leucophrys

Binomial name
- Sylvietta leucophrys Sharpe, 1891
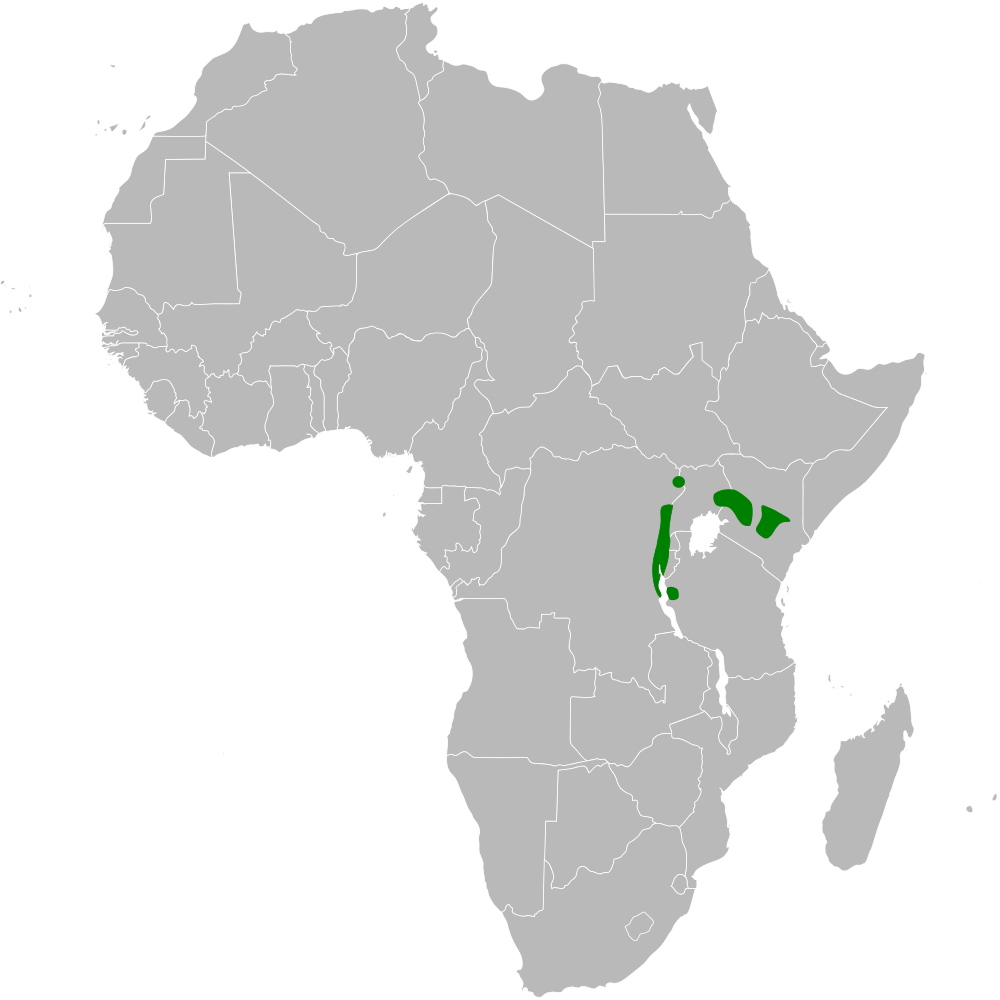

= White-browed crombec =

Species of bird

The white-browed crombec (Sylvietta leucophrys) is a species of African warbler, formerly placed in the family Sylviidae. The enigmatic Chapin's crombec might be a distinct species, or a subspecies Sylvietta leucophrys chapini of the present species.

The white-browed crombec is found in Burundi, Democratic Republic of the Congo, Kenya, Rwanda, Tanzania, and Uganda.
