= Johan Fredrik Victorin =

Swedish zoologist and explorer (1831-1855)

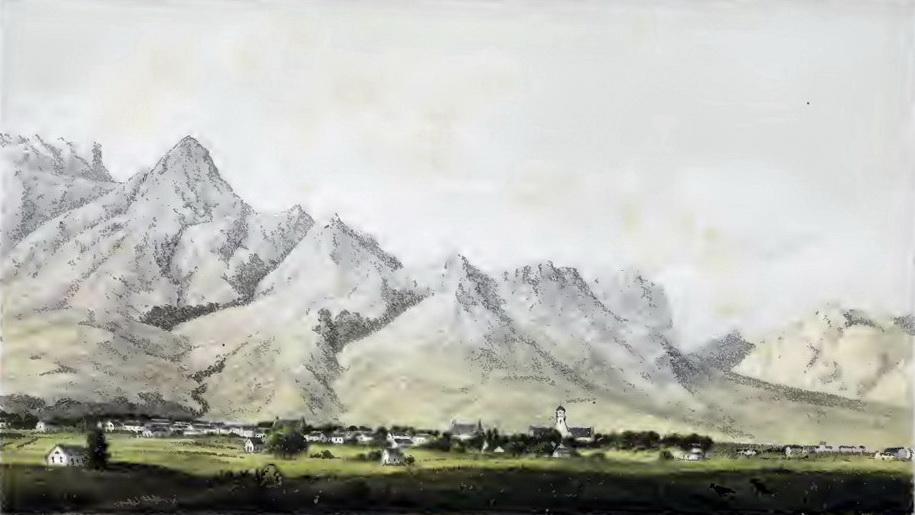
George in 1854 by Johan Fredrik Victorin

Johan Fredrik Victorin (24 February 1831 Kvarns Bruk, Kristberg, Sweden - 3 November 1855 Kvarns Bruk, Kristberg) was a Swedish zoologist and explorer in South Africa. He died at only 24 years of age, soon after returning from his African trip, having collected a large number of natural history specimens including over 2000 insects.

He was the eldest son of Per Henric Victorin (1790–1857), an industrialist from Kvarns Bruk, and his cousin 'Hedda' Hedvig Lovisa Westring (1804–1864), the daughter of Johan Petter Westring, physician to Karl XIV Johan of Sweden. Johan Fredrik's siblings were Carl Henrik Victorin, Eric Gabriel Victorin, Axel Rickard Victorin, August Christoffer Victorin, Ture Otto Victorin and Per Arvid Victorin.

Johan Fredrik was first home-schooled by his father before attending a primary school in Linköping in 1844 and then a high school in 1847. He proved to have a sharp mind and excellent memory, with a talent for drawing and painting. Natural history, and in particular vertebrate zoology, soon captured his interest. In the autumn of 1851 he enrolled at Uppsala University, studying natural history and mathematics. Throughout the summer of 1852 he studied the birds on the island of Öland.

Victorin suffered chronic tuberculosis, which eventually led to his death, and in an effort to convalesce he left for the Cape of Good Hope. Docking in Cape Town on 11 November 1853 he set about collecting in the vicinity. He happened to meet fellow naturalist Johan August Wahlberg, who advised him to extend his travels to the eastern parts of the Cape. On 27 February 1854 he sailed to Mossel Bay and then overland to George and Knysna. He stayed there until 1 December, finding a rich collecting ground in the forests. He became acquainted with members of the George Rex family, travelled to Plettenberg Bay, with excursions to Westford and Redburn. Returning to George he crossed over Montagu Pass into the Little Karoo, staying on the farms Roodeval (now Van Wykskraal) and Zeekoegat, near Oudtshoorn, until February 1855. His health declined over this period. He visited to the Cango Caves on 8 February, sailing for Cape Town from Mossel Bay on 9 March. Nine days later he sailed for Sweden and settled in Qvarn, where he died later that year.

Victorin's collection from the Cape included 83 mammals (of 30 species), 517 birds (153 species), and 20 amphibians (14 species). The birds he prepared and preserved by himself. He also collected 31 bird's eggs (11 species), some 2000 insects, several shells and other invertebrates, plants, seeds, bulbs, and lichens. Two mammals and two birds from his collection were new to science. Generally his specimens were well prepared and his descriptions meticulous. Most of his collection was housed in the Royal Swedish Academy of Sciences which became the Swedish Museum of Natural History. Most of his insects were Coleoptera; his Hemiptera and Orthoptera were described by Carl Stål (1856, 1871) and the Diptera by Hermann Loew (1858, 1860, 1862). The hemipteroid Pentatoma victorini was named after the collector.

Victorin's notes on his collections at the Cape were edited by J.W. Grill and published as "Zoologiska Anteckningar" in the "Proceedings of the Royal Academy of Science". Two new bird descriptions by Carl Jakob Sundevall were included in this paper and one of them was named Bradypterus victorini (now Cryptillas victorini, Victorin's Warbler). Grill also published a book in 1863 compiled from Victorin's letters and diaries, "J.F. Victorins resa i Kaplandet åren 1853-1855".
