= Marie-Victorin (disambiguation) =

Brother Marie-Victorin Kirouac (1885–1944) was a French-Canadian Catholic brother and botanist.

Marie-Victorin may also refer to:

- Marie-Victorin (electoral district), an electoral district in Quebec
- Marie-Victorin, an electoral district within the borough of Rosemont–La Petite-Patrie for the Montreal City Council
- Prix Marie-Victorin, an award for scientific achievement in Quebec
- Cégep Marie-Victorin, a CEGEP (junior college) in Quebec
- Centre de services scolaire Marie-Victorin, a French-language school service centre in Quebec
- Commission scolaire Marie-Victorin, a school board in Quebec

== See also ==
- Statue of Marie-Victorin Kirouac, a statue in Montreal, Quebec
