= Lendu Plateau =

Plateau in the Democratic Republic of the Congo

The Lendu Plateau is an area of high ground in the Ituri Province of the Democratic Republic of the Congo (DRC), on the northwest side of Lake Albert.

== Location ==
The Lendu plateau is roughly a rectangle 80 km long and 50 wide, with the long axis in the SW-NE direction. Its approximate corners are 1.64°N 30.52°E, 15 km south of Droro, 1.98°N 30.24°E, 30 km west of Djugu, 2.47°N 30.81°E, 30 km west of Nebbi, and 2.15°N 31.12°E, 10 km south of Niarembe. The northeast edge of the plateau roughly coincides with the DRC-Uganda border.

== Topography ==
The altitude of the plateau mostly varies between 1700 m and 2000 m. It rises towards the east to a set of mountains, the highest being Mount Aboro (2.010163°N 30.864985°E, 2455 m).
