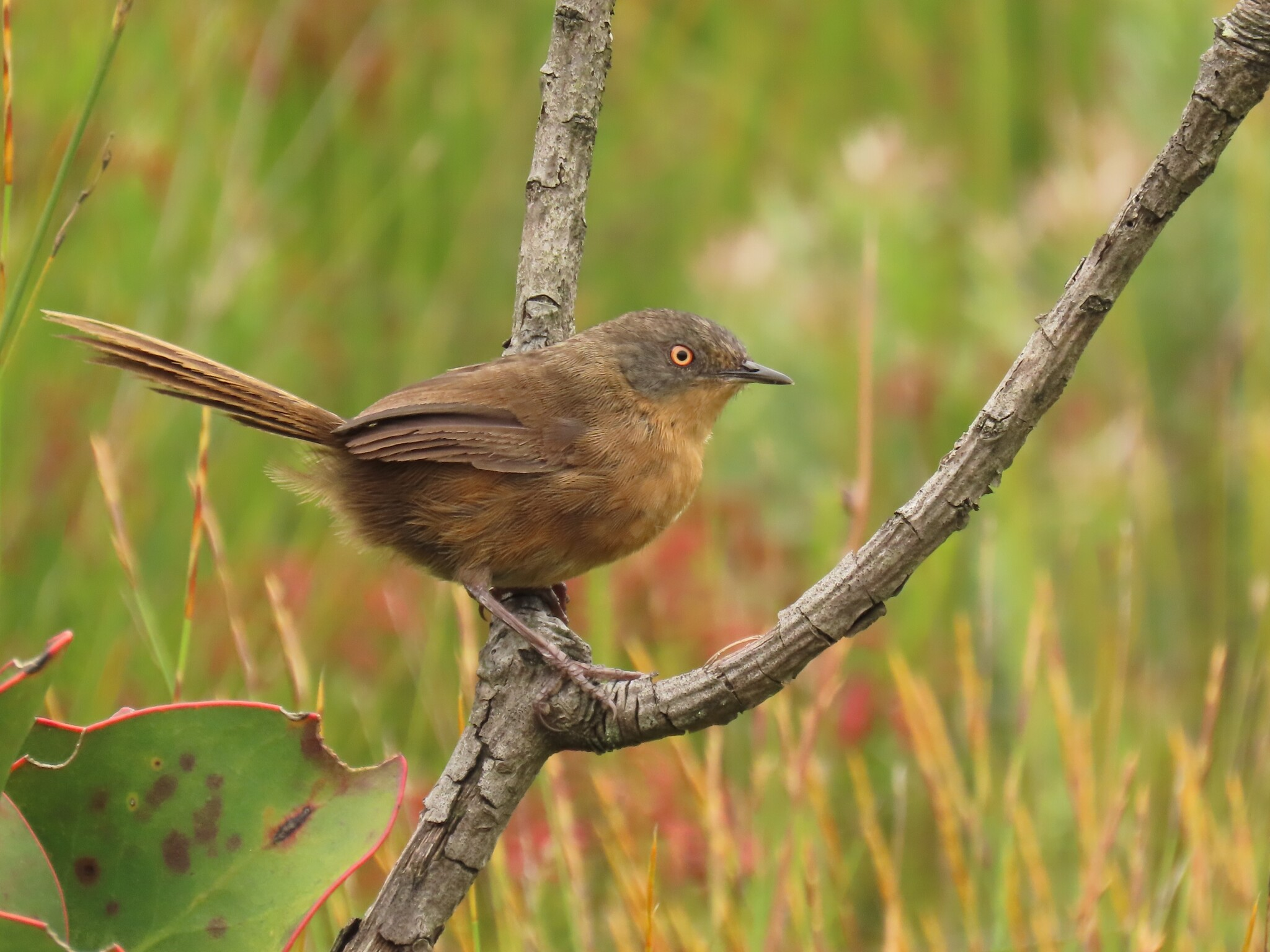

Conservation status
- Least Concern (IUCN 3.1)

Scientific classification
- Kingdom: Animalia
- Phylum: Chordata
- Class: Aves
- Order: Passeriformes
- Family: Macrosphenidae
- Genus: Cryptillas; Oberholser, 1899
- Species: C. victorini

Binomial name
- Cryptillas victorini (Sundevall, 1860)
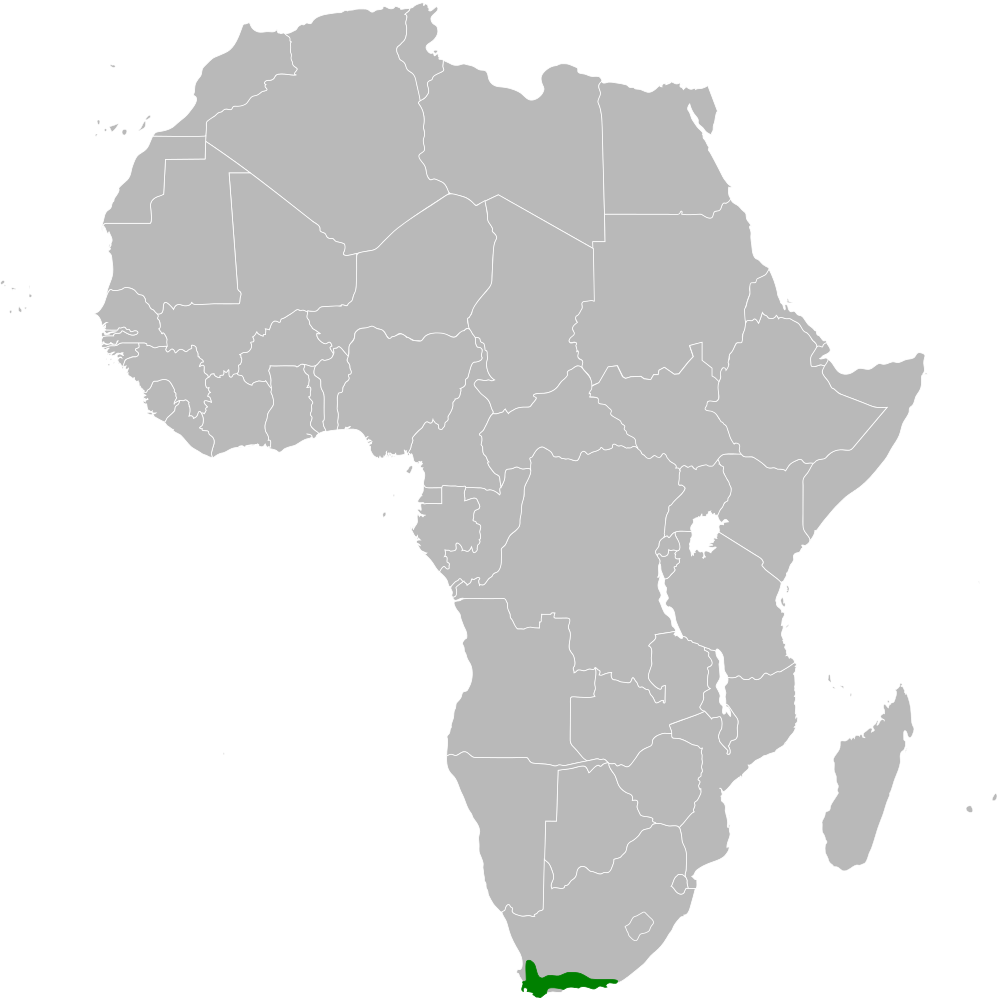

Synonyms
- Bradypterus victorini

= Victorin's warbler =

Species of bird

Victorin's warbler (Cryptillas victorini) or Victorin's scrub warbler, is a species of African warbler, formerly placed in the family Sylviidae. It was recently split from the genus Bradypterus and now belongs to a monotypic genus Cryptillas.

It is endemic to the fynbos of South Africa's coastal Afromontane area.

The common name and scientific name commemorates Johan Fredrik Victorin (1831–1855), a Swedish traveler who visited South Africa.
