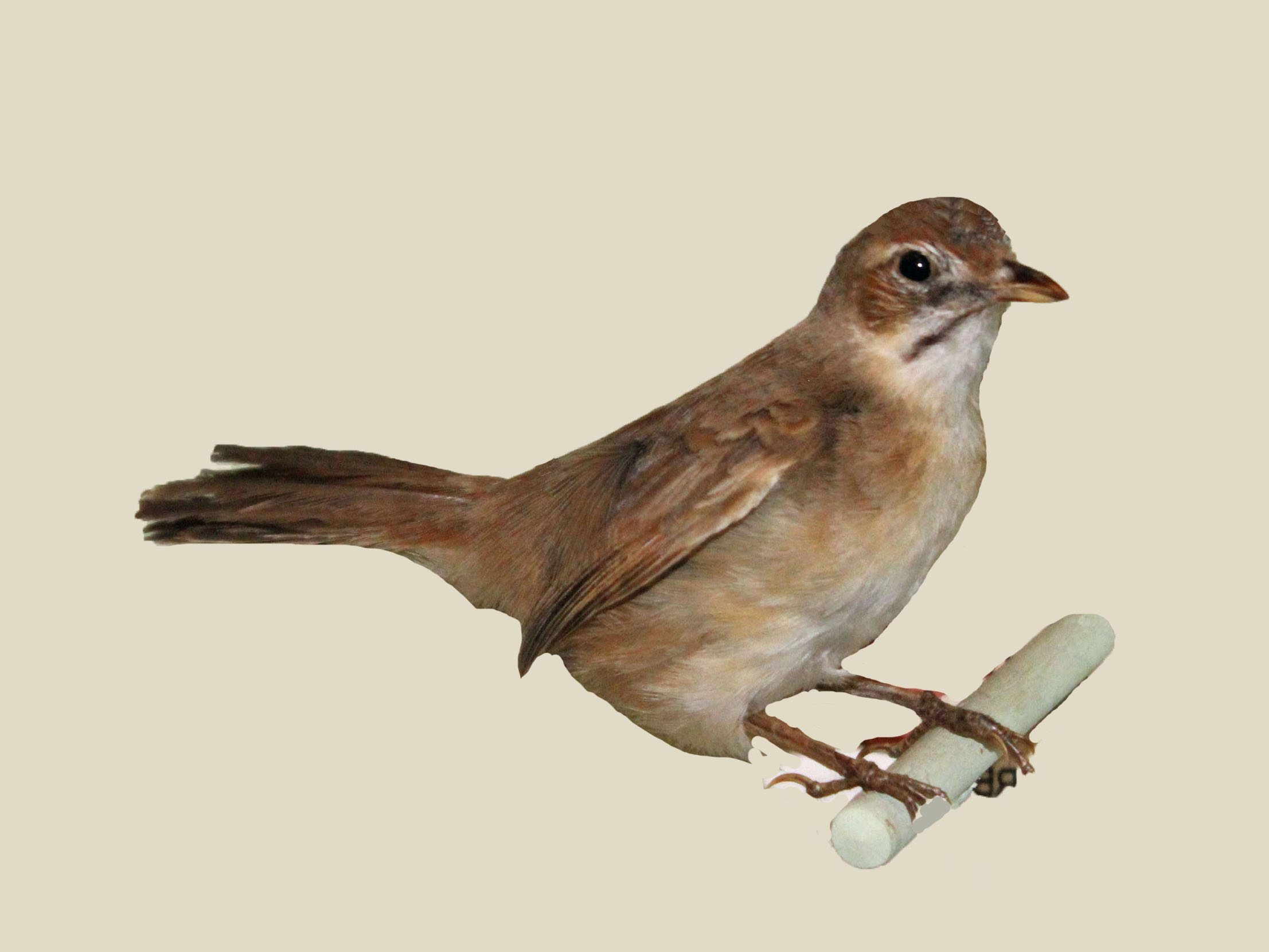
- specimen at Nairobi National Museum

Conservation status
- Least Concern (IUCN 3.1)

Scientific classification
- Kingdom: Animalia
- Phylum: Chordata
- Class: Aves
- Order: Passeriformes
- Family: Macrosphenidae
- Genus: Melocichla; Hartlaub, 1857
- Species: M. mentalis

Binomial name
- Melocichla mentalis (Fraser, 1843)
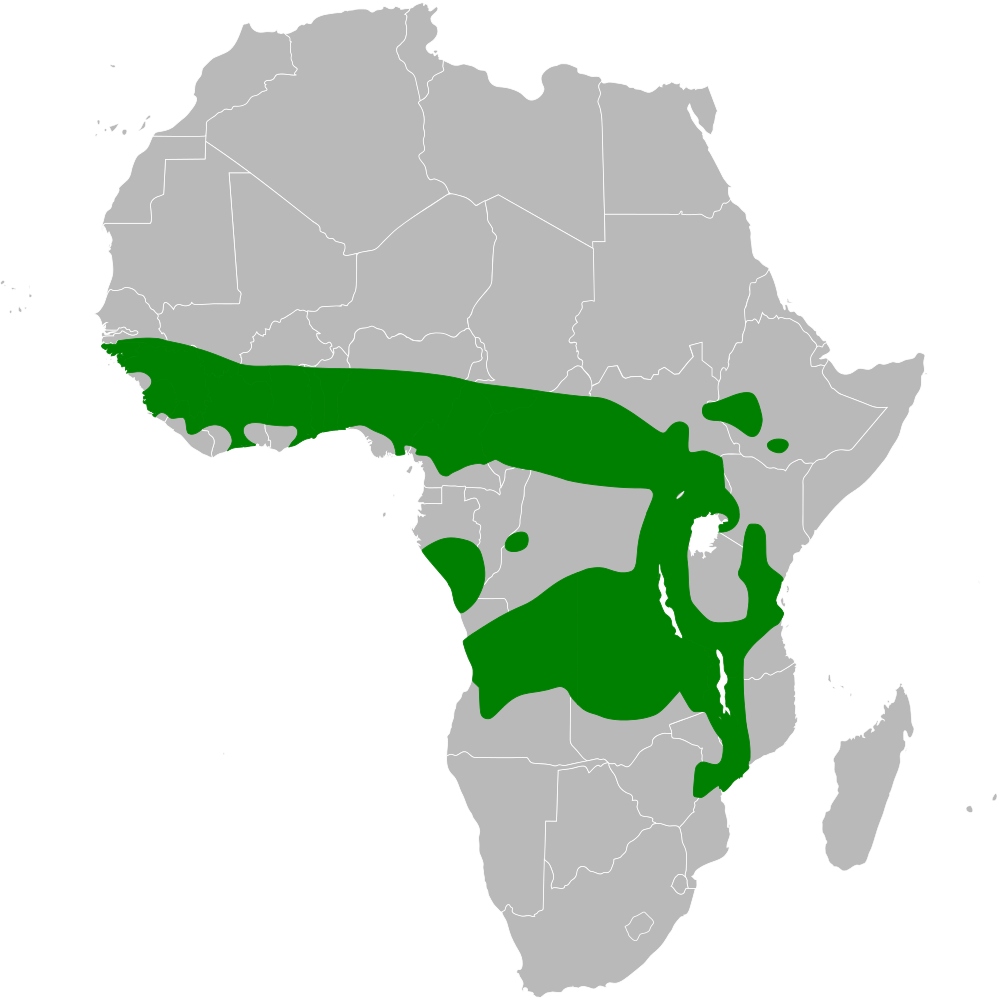

= Moustached grass warbler =

Species of bird

The moustached grass warbler (Melocichla mentalis) is a species of African warbler, formerly placed in the family Sylviidae.

It is widely found throughout Sub-Saharan Africa, although absent in southern parts of the continent. Its natural habitats are moist savanna and subtropical or tropical moist shrubland.

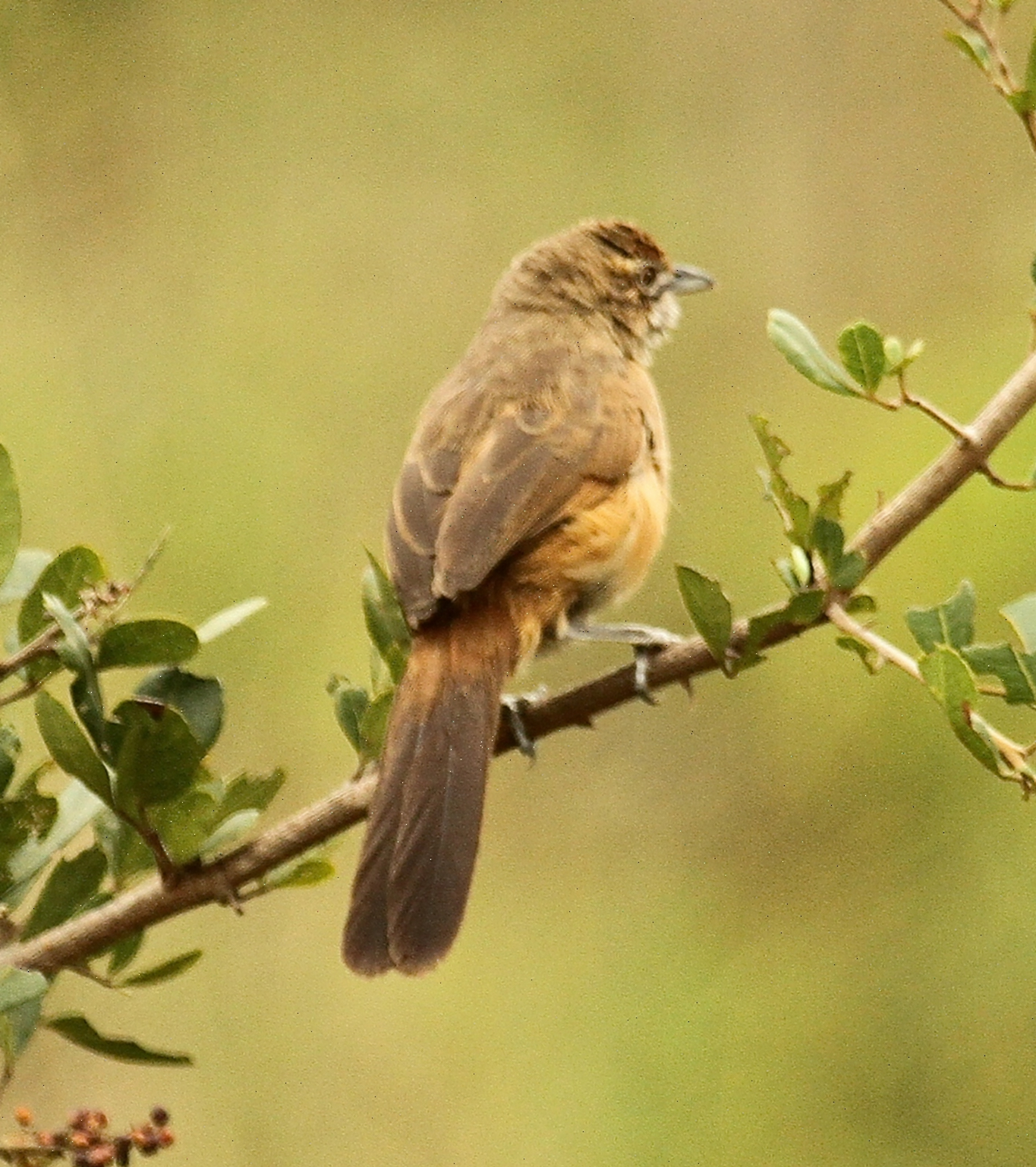
Nairobi National Park - Kenya
