= List of birds of the Democratic Republic of the Congo =

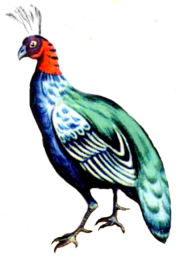
Congo peafowl - the national bird of the DRC

This is a list of the bird species recorded in the Democratic Republic of Congo. The avifauna of the Democratic Republic of Congo include a total of 1188 species, of which twenty-one are endemic, and one has been introduced by humans. This country has the greatest avian biodiversity of any African country.

This list's taxonomic treatment (designation and sequence of orders, families and species) and nomenclature (common and scientific names) follow the conventions of The Clements Checklist of Birds of the World, 2022 edition. The family accounts at the beginning of each heading reflect this taxonomy, as do the species counts found in each family account. Introduced and accidental species are included in the total counts for the Democratic Republic of Congo.

The following tags have been used to highlight several categories. The commonly occurring native species do not fall into any of these categories.

- (A) Accidental - a species that rarely or accidentally occurs in the Democratic Republic of Congo
- (E) Endemic - a species endemic to the Democratic Republic of Congo
- (I) Introduced - a species introduced to the Democratic Republic of Congo as a consequence, direct or indirect, of human actions

== Ducks, geese, and waterfowl ==
Order: Anseriformes Family: Anatidae

Anatidae includes the ducks and most duck-like waterfowl, such as geese and swans. These birds are adapted to an aquatic existence with webbed feet, flattened bills, and feathers that are excellent at shedding water due to an oily coating.

- White-faced whistling-duck, Dendrocygna viduata
- Fulvous whistling-duck, Dendrocygna bicolor
- White-backed duck, Thalassornis leuconotus
- Knob-billed duck, Sarkidiornis melanotos
- Hartlaub's duck, Pteronetta hartlaubii
- Egyptian goose, Alopochen aegyptiaca
- Spur-winged goose, Plectropterus gambensis
- African pygmy-goose, Nettapus auritus
- Garganey, Spatula querquedula
- Blue-billed teal, Spatula hottentota
- Cape shoveler, Spatula smithii (A)
- Northern shoveler, Spatula clypeata
- Gadwall, Mareca strepera (A)
- Eurasian wigeon, Mareca penelope (A)
- African black duck, Anas sparsa
- Yellow-billed duck, Anas undulata
- Cape teal, Anas capensis (A)
- Red-billed duck, Anas erythrorhyncha
- Northern pintail, Anas acuta
- Green-winged teal, Anas crecca (A)
- Southern pochard, Netta erythrophthalma
- Tufted duck, Aythya fuligula (A)
- Maccoa duck, Oxyura maccoa

== Guineafowl ==
Order: Galliformes Family: Numididae

Guineafowl are a group of African, seed-eating, ground-nesting birds that resemble partridges, but with featherless heads and spangled grey plumage. There are 6 species worldwide and 4 species which occur in the Democratic Republic of Congo.

- Helmeted guineafowl, Numida meleagris
- Black guineafowl, Agelastes niger
- Plumed guineafowl, Guttera plumifera
- Western crested guineafowl, Guttera verreauxi

== New World quail ==
Order: Galliformes Family: Odontophoridae

The New World quails are small, plump terrestrial birds only distantly related to the quails of the Old World, but named for their similar appearance and habits.

- Stone partridge, Ptilopachus petrosus
- Nahan's francolin, Ptilopachus nahani

== Pheasants, grouse, and allies ==
Order: Galliformes Family: Phasianidae

The Phasianidae are a family of terrestrial birds which consists of quails, snowcocks, francolins, spurfowls, tragopans, monals, pheasants, peafowls and jungle fowls. In general, they are plump (although they vary in size) and have broad, relatively short wings.

- Congo peacock, Afropavo congensis (E)
- Latham's francolin, Peliperdix lathami
- Crested francolin, Ortygornis sephaena
- Coqui francolin, Campocolinus coqui
- White-throated francolin, Campocolinus albogularis
- Red-winged francolin, Scleroptila levaillantii
- Finsch's francolin, Scleroptila finschi
- Shelley's francolin, Scleroptila shelleyi
- Whyte's francolin, Scleroptila whytei
- Blue quail, Synoicus adansonii
- Common quail, Coturnix coturnix
- Harlequin quail, Coturnix delegorguei
- Handsome francolin, Pternistis nobilis
- Hildebrandt's francolin, Pternistis hildebrandti
- Scaly francolin, Pternistis squamatus
- Heuglin's francolin, Pternistis icterorhynchus
- Red-necked spurfowl, Pternistis afer

== Flamingos ==
Order: Phoenicopteriformes Family: Phoenicopteridae

Flamingos are gregarious wading birds, usually 3 to 5 feet (0.9 to 1.5 m) tall, found in both the Western and Eastern Hemispheres. Flamingos filter-feed on shellfish and algae. Their oddly shaped beaks are specially adapted to separate mud and silt from the food they consume and, uniquely, are used upside-down.

- Greater flamingo, Phoenicopterus roseus
- Lesser flamingo, Phoenicopterus minor

== Grebes ==
Order: Podicipediformes Family: Podicipedidae

Grebes are small to medium-large freshwater diving birds. They have lobed toes and are excellent swimmers and divers. However, they have their feet placed far back on the body, making them quite ungainly on land. There are 20 species worldwide and 2 species which occur in the Democratic Republic of Congo.

- Little grebe, Tachybaptus ruficollis
- Great crested grebe, Podiceps cristatus

== Pigeons and doves ==
Order: Columbiformes Family: Columbidae

Pigeons and doves are stout-bodied birds with short necks and short slender bills with a fleshy cere.

- Rock pigeon, Columba livia
- Speckled pigeon, Columba guinea
- Afep pigeon, Columba unicincta
- Rameron pigeon, Columba arquatrix
- Bronze-naped pigeon, Columba iriditorques
- Lemon dove, Columba larvata
- White-naped pigeon, Columba albinucha
- European turtle-dove, Streptopelia turtur (A)
- Dusky turtle-dove, Streptopelia lugens
- Mourning collared-dove, Streptopelia decipiens
- Red-eyed dove, Streptopelia semitorquata
- Ring-necked dove, Streptopelia capicola
- Vinaceous dove, Streptopelia vinacea
- Laughing dove, Streptopelia senegalensis
- Emerald-spotted wood-dove, Turtur chalcospilos
- Black-billed wood-dove, Turtur abyssinicus
- Blue-spotted wood-dove, Turtur afer
- Tambourine dove, Turtur tympanistria
- Blue-headed wood-dove, Turtur brehmeri
- Namaqua dove, Oena capensis
- Bruce's green-pigeon, Treron waalia
- African green-pigeon, Treron calva

== Bustards ==
Order: Otidiformes Family: Otididae

Bustards are large terrestrial birds mainly associated with dry open country and steppes in the Old World. They are omnivorous and nest on the ground. They walk steadily on strong legs and big toes, pecking for food as they go. They have long broad wings with "fingered" wingtips and striking patterns in flight. Many have interesting mating displays. There are 3 species which have been recorded in the Democratic Republic of Congo.

- Denham's bustard, Neotis denhami
- White-bellied bustard, Eupodotis senegalensis
- Black-bellied bustard, Lissotis melanogaster

== Turacos ==
Order: Musophagiformes Family: Musophagidae

The turacos, plantain eaters and go-away-birds make up the bird family Musophagidae. They are medium-sized arboreal birds. The turacos and plantain eaters are brightly coloured, usually in blue, green or purple. The go-away birds are mostly grey and white.

- Great blue turaco, Corythaeola cristata
- Guinea turaco, Tauraco persa
- Schalow's turaco, Tauraco schalowi
- Black-billed turaco, Tauraco schuettii
- White-crested turaco, Tauraco leucolophus
- Yellow-billed turaco, Tauraco macrorhynchus
- Rwenzori turaco, Ruwenzorornis johnstoni
- Ross's turaco, Musophaga rossae
- Bare-faced go-away-bird, Corythaixoides personatus
- Gray go-away-bird, Corythaixoides concolor
- Western plantain-eater, Crinifer piscator
- Eastern plantain-eater, Crinifer zonurus

== Cuckoos ==
Order: Cuculiformes Family: Cuculidae

The family Cuculidae includes cuckoos, roadrunners and anis. These birds are of variable size with slender bodies, long tails and strong legs. The Old World cuckoos are brood parasites.

- Gabon coucal, Centropus anselli
- Black-throated coucal, Centropus leucogaster
- Senegal coucal, Centropus senegalensis
- Blue-headed coucal, Centropus monachus
- Coppery-tailed coucal, Centropus cupreicaudus
- White-browed coucal, Centropus superciliosus
- Black coucal, Centropus grillii
- Blue malkoha, Ceuthmochares aereus
- Great spotted cuckoo, Clamator glandarius
- Levaillant's cuckoo, Clamator levaillantii
- Pied cuckoo, Clamator jacobinus
- Thick-billed cuckoo, Pachycoccyx audeberti
- Dideric cuckoo, Chrysococcyx caprius
- Klaas's cuckoo, Chrysococcyx klaas
- Yellow-throated cuckoo, Chrysococcyx flavigularis
- African emerald cuckoo, Chrysococcyx cupreus
- Dusky long-tailed cuckoo, Cercococcyx mechowi
- Olive long-tailed cuckoo, Cercococcyx olivinus
- Barred long-tailed cuckoo, Cercococcyx montanus
- Black cuckoo, Cuculus clamosus
- Red-chested cuckoo, Cuculus solitarius
- Lesser cuckoo, Cuculus poliocephalus
- African cuckoo, Cuculus gularis
- Madagascar cuckoo, Cuculus rochii
- Common cuckoo, Cuculus canorus

== Nightjars and allies ==
Order: Caprimulgiformes Family: Caprimulgidae

Nightjars are medium-sized nocturnal birds that usually nest on the ground. They have long wings, short legs and very short bills. Most have small feet, of little use for walking, and long pointed wings. Their soft plumage is camouflaged to resemble bark or leaves.

- Pennant-winged nightjar, Caprimulgus vexillarius
- Standard-winged nightjar, Caprimulgus longipennis
- Brown nightjar, Caprimulgus binotatus
- Eurasian nightjar, Caprimulgus europaeus
- Rufous-cheeked nightjar, Caprimulgus rufigena
- Fiery-necked nightjar, Caprimulgus pectoralis
- Montane nightjar, Caprimulgus poliocephalus
- Swamp nightjar, Caprimulgus natalensis
- Plain nightjar, Caprimulgus inornatus
- Freckled nightjar, Caprimulgus tristigma
- Itombwe nightjar, Caprimulgus prigoginei (E)
- Bates's nightjar, Caprimulgus batesi
- Long-tailed nightjar, Caprimulgus climacurus
- Slender-tailed nightjar, Caprimulgus clarus (A)
- Square-tailed nightjar, Caprimulgus fossii

== Swifts ==
Order: Caprimulgiformes Family: Apodidae

Swifts are small birds which spend the majority of their lives flying. These birds have very short legs and never settle voluntarily on the ground, perching instead only on vertical surfaces. Many swifts have long swept-back wings which resemble a crescent or boomerang.

- Mottled spinetail, Telacanthura ussheri
- Black spinetail, Telacanthura melanopygia
- Sabine's spinetail, Rhaphidura sabini
- Cassin's spinetail, Neafrapus cassini
- Bat-like spinetail, Neafrapus boehmi
- Scarce swift, Schoutedenapus myoptilus
- Alpine swift, Apus melba
- Mottled swift, Apus aequatorialis
- Common swift, Apus apus
- Nyanza swift, Apus niansae (A)
- African swift, Apus barbatus
- Little swift, Apus affinis
- Horus swift, Apus horus
- White-rumped swift, Apus caffer
- Bates's swift, Apus batesi
- African palm-swift, Cypsiurus parvus

== Flufftails ==
Order: Gruiformes Family: Sarothruridae

The flufftails are a small family of ground-dwelling birds found only in Madagascar and sub-Saharan Africa.

- White-spotted flufftail, Sarothrura pulchra
- Buff-spotted flufftail, Sarothrura elegans
- Red-chested flufftail, Sarothrura rufa
- Chestnut-headed flufftail, Sarothrura lugens
- Streaky-breasted flufftail, Sarothrura boehmi
- Striped flufftail, Sarothrura affinis

== Rails, gallinules and coots ==
Order: Gruiformes Family: Rallidae

Rallidae is a large family of small to medium-sized birds which includes the rails, crakes, coots and gallinules. Typically they inhabit dense vegetation in damp environments near lakes, swamps or rivers. In general they are shy and secretive birds, making them difficult to observe. Most species have strong legs and long toes which are well adapted to soft uneven surfaces. They tend to have short, rounded wings and to be weak fliers.

- African rail, Rallus caerulescens
- Corn crake, Crex crex
- African crake, Crex egregia
- Gray-throated rail, Canirallus oculeus
- Spotted crake, Porzana porzana
- Lesser moorhen, Paragallinula angulata
- Eurasian moorhen, Gallinula chloropus
- Red-knobbed coot, Fulica cristata
- Allen's gallinule, Porphyrio alleni
- African swamphen, Porphyrio madagascariensis
- Nkulengu rail, Himantornis haematopus
- Striped crake, Aenigmatolimnas marginalis
- Black crake, Zapornia flavirostra
- Little crake, Zapornia parva
- Baillon's crake, Zapornia pusilla

== Finfoots ==
Order: Gruiformes Family: Heliornithidae

Heliornithidae is a small family of tropical birds with webbed lobes on their feet similar to those of grebes and coots.

- African finfoot, Podica senegalensis

== Cranes ==
Order: Gruiformes Family: Gruidae

Cranes are large, long-legged and long-necked birds. Unlike the similar-looking but unrelated herons, cranes fly with necks outstretched, not pulled back. Most have elaborate and noisy courting displays or "dances".

- Gray crowned-crane, Balearica regulorum
- Black crowned-crane, Balearica pavonina (A)
- Wattled crane, Bugeranus carunculatus

== Thick-knees ==
Order: Charadriiformes Family: Burhinidae

The thick-knees are a group of largely tropical waders in the family Burhinidae. They are found worldwide within the tropical zone, with some species also breeding in temperate Europe and Australia. They are medium to large waders with strong black or yellow-black bills, large yellow eyes and cryptic plumage. Despite being classed as waders, most species have a preference for arid or semi-arid habitats.

- Water thick-knee, Burhinus vermiculatus
- Eurasian thick-knee, Burhinus oedicnemus (A)
- Senegal thick-knee, Burhinus senegalensis
- Spotted thick-knee, Burhinus capensis

== Egyptian plover ==
Order: Charadriiformes Family: Pluvianidae

The Egyptian plover is found across equatorial Africa and along the Nile River.

- Egyptian plover, Pluvianus aegyptius

== Stilts and avocets ==
Order: Charadriiformes Family: Recurvirostridae

Recurvirostridae is a family of large wading birds, which includes the avocets and stilts. The avocets have long legs and long up-curved bills. The stilts have extremely long legs and long, thin, straight bills.

- Black-winged stilt, Himantopus himantopus
- Pied avocet, Recurvirostra avosetta (A)

== Oystercatchers ==
Order: Charadriiformes Family: Haematopodidae

The oystercatchers are large and noisy plover-like birds, with strong bills used for smashing or prising open molluscs.

- Eurasian oystercatcher, Haematopus ostralegus

== Plovers and lapwings ==
Order: Charadriiformes Family: Charadriidae

The family Charadriidae includes the plovers, dotterels and lapwings. They are small to medium-sized birds with compact bodies, short, thick necks and long, usually pointed, wings. They are found in open country worldwide, mostly in habitats near water.

- Black-bellied plover, Pluvialis squatarola
- Pacific golden-plover, Pluvialis fulva (A)
- Long-toed lapwing, Vanellus crassirostris
- Blacksmith lapwing, Vanellus armatus
- Spur-winged lapwing, Vanellus spinosus
- White-headed lapwing, Vanellus albiceps
- Senegal lapwing, Vanellus lugubris
- Crowned lapwing, Vanellus coronatus
- Wattled lapwing, Vanellus senegallus
- Brown-chested lapwing, Vanellus superciliosus
- Lesser sand-plover, Charadrius mongolus (A)
- Greater sand-plover, Charadrius leschenaultii (A)
- Caspian plover, Charadrius asiaticus
- Kittlitz's plover, Charadrius pecuarius
- Kentish plover, Charadrius alexandrinus
- Common ringed plover, Charadrius hiaticula
- Little ringed plover, Charadrius dubius
- Three-banded plover, Charadrius tricollaris
- Forbes's plover, Charadrius forbesi
- White-fronted plover, Charadrius marginatus

== Painted-snipes ==
Order: Charadriiformes Family: Rostratulidae

Painted-snipes are short-legged, long-billed birds similar in shape to the true snipes, but more brightly coloured.

- Greater painted-snipe, Rostratula benghalensis

== Jacanas ==
Order: Charadriiformes Family: Jacanidae

The jacanas are a group of tropical waders in the family Jacanidae. They are found throughout the tropics. They are identifiable by their huge feet and claws which enable them to walk on floating vegetation in the shallow lakes that are their preferred habitat.

- Lesser jacana, Microparra capensis
- African jacana, Actophilornis africanus

== Sandpipers and allies ==
Order: Charadriiformes Family: Scolopacidae

Scolopacidae is a large diverse family of small to medium-sized shorebirds including the sandpipers, curlews, godwits, shanks, tattlers, woodcocks, snipes, dowitchers and phalaropes. The majority of these species eat small invertebrates picked out of the mud or soil. Variation in length of legs and bills enables multiple species to feed in the same habitat, particularly on the coast, without direct competition for food.

- Whimbrel, Numenius phaeopus
- Eurasian curlew, Numenius arquata
- Bar-tailed godwit, Limosa lapponica (A)
- Black-tailed godwit, Limosa limosa
- Ruddy turnstone, Arenaria interpres
- Ruff, Calidris pugnax
- Curlew sandpiper, Calidris ferruginea
- Temminck's stint, Calidris temminckii
- Sanderling, Calidris alba
- Dunlin, Calidris alpina (A)
- Little stint, Calidris minuta
- Jack snipe, Lymnocryptes minimus
- Great snipe, Gallinago media
- Common snipe, Gallinago gallinago
- African snipe, Gallinago nigripennis
- Terek sandpiper, Xenus cinereus (A)
- Red-necked phalarope, Phalaropus lobatus (A)
- Common sandpiper, Actitis hypoleucos
- Green sandpiper, Tringa ochropus
- Spotted redshank, Tringa erythropus
- Common greenshank, Tringa nebularia
- Marsh sandpiper, Tringa stagnatilis
- Wood sandpiper, Tringa glareola
- Common redshank, Tringa totanus

== Buttonquail ==
Order: Charadriiformes Family: Turnicidae

The buttonquail are small, drab, running birds which resemble the true quails. The female is the brighter of the sexes and initiates courtship. The male incubates the eggs and tends the young.

- Small buttonquail, Turnix sylvatica
- Black-rumped buttonquail, Turnix nanus

== Pratincoles and coursers ==
Order: Charadriiformes Family: Glareolidae

Glareolidae is a family of wading birds comprising the pratincoles, which have short legs, long pointed wings and long forked tails, and the coursers, which have long legs, short wings and long, pointed bills which curve downwards.

- Temminck's courser, Cursorius temminckii
- Bronze-winged courser, Rhinoptilus chalcopterus
- Collared pratincole, Glareola pratincola
- Black-winged pratincole, Glareola nordmanni
- Rock pratincole, Glareola nuchalis
- Gray pratincole, Glareola cinerea

== Skuas and jaegers ==
Order: Charadriiformes Family: Stercorariidae

The family Stercorariidae are, in general, medium to large birds, typically with grey or brown plumage, often with white markings on the wings. They nest on the ground in temperate and arctic regions and are long-distance migrants.

- Parasitic jaeger, Stercorarius parasiticus (A)

== Gulls, terns, and skimmers ==
Order: Charadriiformes Family: Laridae

Laridae is a family of medium to large seabirds, the gulls, terns, and skimmers. Gulls are typically grey or white, often with black markings on the head or wings. They have stout, longish bills and webbed feet. Terns are a group of generally medium to large seabirds typically with grey or white plumage, often with black markings on the head. Most terns hunt fish by diving but some pick insects off the surface of fresh water. Terns are generally long-lived birds, with several species known to live in excess of 30 years. Skimmers are a small family of tropical tern-like birds. They have an elongated lower mandible which they use to feed by flying low over the water surface and skimming the water for small fish.

- Gray-hooded gull, Chroicocephalus cirrocephalus
- Black-headed gull, Chroicocephalus ridibundus (A)
- Herring gull, Larus argentatus (A)
- Lesser black-backed gull, Larus fuscus
- Little tern, Sternula albifrons
- Damara tern, Sternula balaenarum
- Gull-billed tern, Gelochelidon nilotica
- Caspian tern, Hydroprogne caspia (A)
- Black tern, Chlidonias niger (A)
- White-winged tern, Chlidonias leucopterus
- Whiskered tern, Chlidonias hybrida (A)
- Common tern, Sterna hirundo
- Arctic tern, Sterna paradisaea (A)
- Sandwich tern, Thalasseus sandvicensis
- West African crested tern, Thalasseus albididorsalis
- African skimmer, Rynchops flavirostris

== Southern storm-petrels ==
Order: Procellariiformes Family: Oceanitidae

The southern storm-petrels are relatives of the petrels and are the smallest seabirds. They feed on planktonic crustaceans and small fish picked from the surface, typically while hovering. The flight is fluttering and sometimes bat-like.

- Wilson's storm-petrel, Oceanites oceanicus

== Storks ==
Order: Ciconiiformes Family: Ciconiidae

Storks are large, long-legged, long-necked, wading birds with long, stout bills. Storks are mute, but bill-clattering is an important mode of communication at the nest. Their nests can be large and may be reused for many years. Many species are migratory.

- African openbill, Anastomus lamelligerus
- Black stork, Ciconia nigra (A)
- Abdim's stork, Ciconia abdimii
- African woolly-necked stork, Ciconia microscelis
- White stork, Ciconia ciconia
- Saddle-billed stork, Ephippiorhynchus senegalensis
- Marabou stork, Leptoptilos crumenifer
- Yellow-billed stork, Mycteria ibis

== Boobies and gannets ==
Order: Suliformes Family: Sulidae

The sulids comprise the gannets and boobies. Both groups are medium to large coastal seabirds that plunge-dive for fish.

- Cape gannet, Morus capensis (A)

== Anhingas ==
Order: Suliformes Family: Anhingidae

Anhingas or darters are often called "snake-birds" because of their long thin neck, which gives a snake-like appearance when they swim with their bodies submerged. The males have black and dark-brown plumage, an erectile crest on the nape and a larger bill than the female. The females have much paler plumage especially on the neck and underparts. The darters have completely webbed feet and their legs are short and set far back on the body. Their plumage is somewhat permeable, like that of cormorants, and they spread their wings to dry after diving.

- African darter, Anhinga rufa

== Cormorants and shags ==
Order: Suliformes Family: Phalacrocoracidae

Phalacrocoracidae is a family of medium to large coastal, fish-eating seabirds that includes cormorants and shags. Plumage colouration varies, with the majority having mainly dark plumage, some species being black-and-white and a few being colourful.

- Long-tailed cormorant, Microcarbo africanus
- Cape cormorant, Phalacrocorax capensis (A)
- Great cormorant, Phalacrocorax carbo

== Pelicans ==
Order: Pelecaniformes Family: Pelecanidae

Pelicans are large water birds with a distinctive pouch under their beak. As with other members of the order Pelecaniformes, they have webbed feet with four toes.

- Great white pelican, Pelecanus onocrotalus
- Pink-backed pelican, Pelecanus rufescens

== Shoebill ==
Order: Pelecaniformes Family: Balaenicipididae

The shoebill is a large bird related to the pelicans. It derives its name from its massive shoe-shaped bill.

- Shoebill, Balaeniceps rex

== Hammerkop ==
Order: Pelecaniformes Family: Scopidae

The hammerkop is a medium-sized bird with a long shaggy crest. The shape of its head with a curved bill and crest at the back is reminiscent of a hammer, hence its name. Its plumage is drab-brown all over.

- Hamerkop, Scopus umbretta

== Herons, egrets, and bitterns ==
Order: Pelecaniformes Family: Ardeidae

The family Ardeidae contains the bitterns, herons and egrets. Herons and egrets are medium to large wading birds with long necks and legs. Bitterns tend to be shorter necked and more wary. Members of Ardeidae fly with their necks retracted, unlike other long-necked birds such as storks, ibises and spoonbills.

- Great bittern, Botaurus stellaris (A)
- Little bittern, Ixobrychus minutus
- Dwarf bittern, Ixobrychus sturmii
- White-crested bittern, Tigriornis leucolophus
- Gray heron, Ardea cinerea
- Black-headed heron, Ardea melanocephala
- Goliath heron, Ardea goliath
- Purple heron, Ardea purpurea
- Great egret, Ardea alba
- Intermediate egret, Ardea intermedia
- Little egret, Egretta garzetta
- Western reef-heron, Egretta gularis (A)
- Slaty egret, Egretta vinaceigula (A)
- Black heron, Egretta ardesiaca
- Cattle egret, Bubulcus ibis
- Squacco heron, Ardeola ralloides
- Malagasy pond-heron, Ardeola idae
- Rufous-bellied heron, Ardeola rufiventris
- Striated heron, Butorides striata
- Black-crowned night-heron, Nycticorax nycticorax
- White-backed night-heron, Gorsachius leuconotus

== Ibises and spoonbills ==
Order: Pelecaniformes Family: Threskiornithidae

Threskiornithidae is a family of large terrestrial and wading birds which includes the ibises and spoonbills. They have long, broad wings with 11 primary and about 20 secondary feathers. They are strong fliers and despite their size and weight, very capable soarers.

- Glossy ibis, Plegadis falcinellus
- African sacred ibis, Threskiornis aethiopicus
- Olive ibis, Bostrychia olivacea
- Spot-breasted ibis, Bostrychia rara
- Hadada ibis, Bostrychia hagedash
- Eurasian spoonbill, Platalea leucorodia (A)
- African spoonbill, Platalea alba

== Secretarybird ==
Order: Accipitriformes Family: Sagittariidae

The secretarybird is a bird of prey in the order Accipitriformes but is easily distinguished from other raptors by its long crane-like legs.

- Secretarybird, Sagittarius serpentarius

== Osprey ==
Order: Accipitriformes Family: Pandionidae

The family Pandionidae contains only one species, the osprey. The osprey is a medium-large raptor which is a specialist fish-eater with a worldwide distribution.

- Osprey, Pandion haliaetus

== Hawks, eagles, and kites ==
Order: Accipitriformes Family: Accipitridae

Accipitridae is a family of birds of prey, which includes hawks, eagles, kites, harriers and Old World vultures. These birds have powerful hooked beaks for tearing flesh from their prey, strong legs, powerful talons and keen eyesight.

- Black-winged kite, Elanus caeruleus
- African harrier-hawk, Polyboroides typus
- Palm-nut vulture, Gypohierax angolensis
- Bearded vulture, Gypaetus barbatus
- European honey-buzzard, Pernis apivorus
- African cuckoo-hawk, Aviceda cuculoides
- White-headed vulture, Trigonoceps occipitalis
- Lappet-faced vulture, Torgos tracheliotos
- Hooded vulture, Necrosyrtes monachus
- White-backed vulture, Gyps africanus
- Rüppell's griffon, Gyps rueppelli (A)
- Bateleur, Terathopius ecaudatus
- Congo serpent-eagle, Dryotriorchis spectabilis
- Beaudouin's snake-eagle, Circaetus beaudouini
- Black-chested snake-eagle, Circaetus pectoralis
- Brown snake-eagle, Circaetus cinereus
- Banded snake-eagle, Circaetus cinerascens
- Bat hawk, Macheiramphus alcinus
- Crowned eagle, Stephanoaetus coronatus
- Martial eagle, Polemaetus bellicosus
- Long-crested eagle, Lophaetus occipitalis
- Lesser spotted eagle, Clanga pomarina
- Wahlberg's eagle, Hieraaetus wahlbergi
- Booted eagle, Hieraaetus pennatus
- Ayres's hawk-eagle, Hieraaetus ayresii
- Tawny eagle, Aquila rapax
- Steppe eagle, Aquila nipalensis
- Cassin's hawk-eagle, Aquila africana
- Verreaux's eagle, Aquila verreauxii (A)
- African hawk-eagle, Aquila spilogaster
- Lizard buzzard, Kaupifalco monogrammicus
- Dark chanting-goshawk, Melierax metabates
- Gabar goshawk, Micronisus gabar
- Grasshopper buzzard, Butastur rufipennis
- Eurasian marsh-harrier, Circus aeruginosus
- African marsh-harrier, Circus ranivorus
- Pallid harrier, Circus macrourus
- Montagu's harrier, Circus pygargus
- African goshawk, Accipiter tachiro
- Chestnut-flanked sparrowhawk, Accipiter castanilius
- Shikra, Accipiter badius
- Levant sparrowhawk, Accipiter brevipes (A)
- Red-thighed sparrowhawk, Accipiter erythropus
- Little sparrowhawk, Accipiter minullus
- Ovambo sparrowhawk, Accipiter ovampensis
- Rufous-breasted sparrowhawk, Accipiter rufiventris
- Black goshawk, Accipiter melanoleucus
- Long-tailed hawk, Urotriorchis macrourus
- Black kite, Milvus migrans
- African fish-eagle, Haliaeetus vocifer
- Common buzzard, Buteo buteo
- Mountain buzzard, Buteo oreophilus
- Red-necked buzzard, Buteo auguralis
- Augur buzzard, Buteo augur

== Barn-owls ==
Order: Strigiformes Family: Tytonidae

Barn owls are medium to large owls with large heads and characteristic heart-shaped faces. They have long strong legs with powerful talons.

- African grass owl, Tyto capensis
- Western barn owl, Tyto alba
- Congo bay-owl, Phodilus prigoginei (E)

== Owls ==
Order: Strigiformes Family: Strigidae

The typical owls are small to large solitary nocturnal birds of prey. They have large forward-facing eyes and ears, a hawk-like beak and a conspicuous circle of feathers around each eye called a facial disk.

- Sandy scops-owl, Otus icterorhynchus
- Eurasian scops-owl, Otus scops
- African scops-owl, Otus senegalensis
- Northern white-faced owl, Ptilopsis leucotis
- Southern white-faced owl, Ptilopsis granti
- Maned owl, Jubula lettii
- Spotted eagle-owl, Bubo africanus
- Grayish eagle-owl, Bubo cinerascens
- Fraser's eagle-owl, Bubo poensis
- Shelley's eagle-owl, Bubo shelleyi
- Verreaux's eagle-owl, Bubo lacteus
- Akun eagle-owl, Bubo leucostictus
- Pel's fishing-owl, Scotopelia peli
- Vermiculated fishing-owl, Scotopelia bouvieri
- Pearl-spotted owlet, Glaucidium perlatum
- Red-chested owlet, Glaucidium tephronotum
- Sjostedt's owlet, Glaucidium sjostedti
- African barred owlet, Glaucidium capense
- Albertine owlet, Glaucidium albertinum
- African wood-owl, Strix woodfordii
- Abyssinian owl, Asio abyssinicus
- Marsh owl, Asio capensis

== Mousebirds ==
Order: Coliiformes Family: Coliidae

The mousebirds are slender greyish or brown birds with soft, hairlike body feathers and very long thin tails. They are arboreal and scurry through the leaves like rodents in search of berries, fruit and buds. They are acrobatic and can feed upside down. All species have strong claws and reversible outer toes. They also have crests and stubby bills.

- Speckled mousebird, Colius striatus
- Red-backed mousebird, Colius castanotus
- Blue-naped mousebird, Urocolius macrourus
- Red-faced mousebird, Urocolius indicus

== Trogons ==
Order: Trogoniformes Family: Trogonidae

The family Trogonidae includes trogons and quetzals. Found in tropical woodlands worldwide, they feed on insects and fruit, and their broad bills and weak legs reflect their diet and arboreal habits. Although their flight is fast, they are reluctant to fly any distance. Trogons have soft, often colourful, feathers with distinctive male and female plumage.

- Narina trogon, Apaloderma narina
- Bare-cheeked trogon, Apaloderma aequatoriale
- Bar-tailed trogon, Apaloderma vittatum

== Hoopoes ==
Order: Bucerotiformes Family: Upupidae

Hoopoes have black, white and orangey-pink colouring with a large erectile crest on their head. There are 2 species worldwide and 1 species which occurs in the Democratic Republic of Congo.

- Eurasian hoopoe, Upupa epops

== Woodhoopoes ==
Order: Bucerotiformes Family: Phoeniculidae

The woodhoopoes are related to the kingfishers, rollers and hoopoes. They most resemble the hoopoes with their long curved bills, used to probe for insects, and short rounded wings. However, they differ in that they have metallic plumage, often blue, green or purple, and lack an erectile crest.

- Green woodhoopoe, Phoeniculus purpureus
- White-headed woodhoopoe, Phoeniculus bollei
- Forest woodhoopoe, Phoeniculus castaneiceps
- Black scimitarbill, Rhinopomastus aterrimus
- Common scimitarbill, Rhinopomastus cyanomelas

== Ground-hornbills ==
Order: Bucerotiformes Family: Bucorvidae

The ground-hornbills are terrestrial birds which feed almost entirely on insects, other birds, snakes, and amphibians.

- Abyssinian ground-hornbill, Bucorvus abyssinicus
- Southern ground-hornbill, Bucorvus leadbeateri

== Hornbills ==
Order: Bucerotiformes Family: Bucerotidae

Hornbills are a group of birds whose bill is shaped like a cow's horn, but without a twist, sometimes with a casque on the upper mandible. Frequently, the bill is brightly coloured.

- Red-billed dwarf hornbill, Lophoceros camurus
- Crowned hornbill, Lophoceros alboterminatus
- African pied hornbill, Lophoceros fasciatus
- African gray hornbill, Lophoceros nasutus
- Pale-billed hornbill, Lophoceros pallidirostris
- White-crested hornbill, Horizocerus albocristatus
- Black dwarf hornbill, Horizocerus hartlaubi
- Black-casqued hornbill, Ceratogymna atrata
- Black-and-white-casqued hornbill, Bycanistes subcylindricus
- White-thighed hornbill, Bycanistes albotibialis
- Trumpeter hornbill, Bycanistes bucinator
- Piping hornbill, Bycanistes fistulator

== Kingfishers ==
Order: Coraciiformes Family: Alcedinidae

Kingfishers are medium-sized birds with large heads, long, pointed bills, short legs and stubby tails. There are 93 species worldwide and 14 species which occur in the Democratic Republic of Congo.

- Half-collared kingfisher, Alcedo semitorquata
- Shining-blue kingfisher, Alcedo quadribrachys
- Malachite kingfisher, Corythornis cristatus
- White-bellied kingfisher, Corythornis leucogaster
- African pygmy kingfisher, Ispidina picta
- African dwarf kingfisher, Ispidina lecontei
- Chocolate-backed kingfisher, Halcyon badia
- Gray-headed kingfisher, Halcyon leucocephala
- Woodland kingfisher, Halcyon senegalensis
- Blue-breasted kingfisher, Halcyon malimbica
- Brown-hooded kingfisher, Halcyon albiventris
- Striped kingfisher, Halcyon chelicuti
- Giant kingfisher, Megaceryle maximus
- Pied kingfisher, Ceryle rudis

== Bee-eaters ==
Order: Coraciiformes Family: Meropidae

The bee-eaters are a group of coraciiform birds in the family Meropidae. Most species are found in Africa but others occur in southern Europe, Madagascar, Australia and New Guinea. They are characterised by richly coloured plumage, slender bodies and usually elongated central tail feathers. All are colourful and have long downturned bills and pointed wings, which give them a swallow-like appearance when seen from afar. There are 26 species worldwide and 17 species which occur in the Democratic Republic of Congo. The Democratic Republic of Congo contains the largest number of bee-eaters of any country.

- Black bee-eater, Merops gularis
- Blue-headed bee-eater, Merops muelleri
- Red-throated bee-eater, Merops bulocki
- White-fronted bee-eater, Merops bullockoides
- Little bee-eater, Merops pusillus
- Blue-breasted bee-eater, Merops variegatus
- Cinnamon-chested bee-eater, Merops oreobates
- Swallow-tailed bee-eater, Merops hirundineus
- Black-headed bee-eater, Merops breweri
- White-throated bee-eater, Merops albicollis
- Böhm's bee-eater, Merops boehmi
- Blue-cheeked bee-eater, Merops persicus
- Madagascar bee-eater, Merops superciliosus
- European bee-eater, Merops apiaster
- Rosy bee-eater, Merops malimbicus
- Northern carmine bee-eater, Merops nubicus
- Southern carmine bee-eater, Merops nubicoides

== Rollers ==
Order: Coraciiformes Family: Coraciidae

Rollers resemble crows in size and build, but are more closely related to the kingfishers and bee-eaters. They share the colourful appearance of those groups with blues and browns predominating. The two inner front toes are connected, but the outer toe is not. The Democratic Republic of Congo contains the largest number of rollers of any country.

- European roller, Coracias garrulus
- Abyssinian roller, Coracias abyssinica
- Lilac-breasted roller, Coracias caudata
- Racket-tailed roller, Coracias spatulata
- Rufous-crowned roller, Coracias naevia
- Blue-bellied roller, Coracias cyanogaster
- Broad-billed roller, Eurystomus glaucurus
- Blue-throated roller, Eurystomus gularis

== African barbets ==
Order: Piciformes Family: Lybiidae

The African barbets are plump birds, with short necks and large heads. They get their name from the bristles which fringe their heavy bills. Most species are brightly coloured.

- Yellow-billed barbet, Trachyphonus purpuratus
- Crested barbet, Trachyphonus vaillantii
- Yellow-breasted barbet, Trachyphonus margaritatus
- Gray-throated barbet, Gymnobucco bonapartei
- Sladen's barbet, Gymnobucco sladeni
- Bristle-nosed barbet, Gymnobucco peli
- Naked-faced barbet, Gymnobucco calvus
- Whyte's barbet, Stactolaema whytii
- Anchieta's barbet, Stactolaema anchietae
- Speckled tinkerbird, Pogoniulus scolopaceus
- Western tinkerbird, Pogoniulus coryphaea
- Red-rumped tinkerbird, Pogoniulus atroflavus
- Yellow-throated tinkerbird, Pogoniulus subsulphureus
- Yellow-rumped tinkerbird, Pogoniulus bilineatus
- Yellow-fronted tinkerbird, Pogoniulus chrysoconus
- Yellow-spotted barbet, Buccanodon duchaillui
- Hairy-breasted barbet, Tricholaema hirsuta
- Miombo barbet, Tricholaema frontata
- Spot-flanked barbet, Tricholaema lachrymosa
- Vieillot's barbet, Lybius vieilloti
- White-headed barbet, Lybius leucocephalus
- Black-billed barbet, Lybius guifsobalito
- Black-collared barbet, Lybius torquatus
- Black-backed barbet, Lybius minor
- Double-toothed barbet, Lybius bidentatus
- Black-breasted barbet, Lybius rolleti

== Honeyguides ==
Order: Piciformes Family: Indicatoridae

Honeyguides are among the few birds that feed on wax. They are named for the greater honeyguide which leads traditional honey-hunters to bees' nests and, after the hunters have harvested the honey, feeds on the remaining contents of the hive.

- Cassin's honeyguide, Prodotiscus insignis
- Green-backed honeyguide, Prodotiscus zambesiae
- Wahlberg's honeyguide, Prodotiscus regulus
- Zenker's honeyguide, Melignomon zenkeri
- Dwarf honeyguide, Indicator pumilio
- Willcocks's honeyguide, Indicator willcocksi
- Pallid honeyguide, Indicator meliphilus
- Least honeyguide, Indicator exilis
- Lesser honeyguide, Indicator minor
- Spotted honeyguide, Indicator maculatus
- Scaly-throated honeyguide, Indicator variegatus
- Greater honeyguide, Indicator indicator
- Lyre-tailed honeyguide, Melichneutes robustus

== Woodpeckers ==
Order: Piciformes Family: Picidae

Woodpeckers are small to medium-sized birds with chisel-like beaks, short legs, stiff tails and long tongues used for capturing insects. Some species have feet with two toes pointing forward and two backward, while several species have only three toes. Many woodpeckers have the habit of tapping noisily on tree trunks with their beaks.

- Eurasian wryneck, Jynx torquilla (A)
- Rufous-necked wryneck, Jynx ruficollis
- African piculet, Verreauxia africana
- Gabon woodpecker, Chloropicus gabonensis
- Elliot's woodpecker, Chloropicus elliotii
- Speckle-breasted woodpecker, Chloropicus poecilolaemus
- Cardinal woodpecker, Chloropicus fuscescens
- Bearded woodpecker, Chloropicus namaquus
- Golden-crowned woodpecker, Chloropicus xantholophus
- Brown-backed woodpecker, Chloropicus obsoletus
- African gray woodpecker, Chloropicus goertae
- Olive woodpecker, Chloropicus griseocephalus
- Brown-eared woodpecker, Campethera caroli
- Buff-spotted woodpecker, Campethera nivosa
- Tullberg's woodpecker, Campethera tullbergi
- Green-backed woodpecker, Campethera cailliautii
- Nubian woodpecker, Campethera nubica
- Fine-spotted woodpecker, Campethera punctuligera
- Bennett's woodpecker, Campethera bennettii
- Golden-tailed woodpecker, Campethera abingoni

== Falcons and caracaras ==
Order: Falconiformes Family: Falconidae

Falconidae is a family of diurnal birds of prey. They differ from hawks, eagles and kites in that they kill with their beaks instead of their talons.

- Pygmy falcon, Polihierax semitorquatus
- Lesser kestrel, Falco naumanni
- Eurasian kestrel, Falco tinnunculus
- Rock kestrel, Falco rupicolus
- Fox kestrel, Falco alopex
- Gray kestrel, Falco ardosiaceus
- Dickinson's kestrel, Falco dickinsoni
- Red-necked falcon, Falco chicquera
- Red-footed falcon, Falco vespertinus
- Amur falcon, Falco amurensis (A)
- Eleonora's falcon, Falco eleonorae
- Eurasian hobby, Falco subbuteo
- African hobby, Falco cuvierii
- Lanner falcon, Falco biarmicus
- Peregrine falcon, Falco peregrinus

== Old World parrots ==
Order: Psittaciformes Family: Psittaculidae

Characteristic features of parrots include a strong curved bill, an upright stance, strong legs, and clawed zygodactyl feet. Many parrots are vividly coloured, and some are multi-coloured. In size they range from 8 cm (3.1 in) to 1 m (3.3 ft) in length. Old World parrots are found from Africa east across south and southeast Asia and Oceania to Australia and New Zealand.

- Rose-ringed parakeet, Psittacula krameri
- Black-collared lovebird, Agapornis swinderniana
- Red-headed lovebird, Agapornis pullarius

== African and New World parrots ==
Order: Psittaciformes Family: Psittacidae

African and New World parrots are small to large birds with a characteristic curved beak. Their upper mandibles have slight mobility in the joint with the skull and they have a generally erect stance. All parrots are zygodactyl, having the four toes on each foot placed two at the front and two to the back. Most of the more than 150 species in this family are found in the New World.

- Gray parrot, Psittacus erithacus
- Brown-necked parrot, Poicephalus robustus
- Red-fronted parrot, Poicephalus gulielmi
- Meyer's parrot, Poicephalus meyeri
- Niam-Niam parrot, Poicephalus crassus

== African and green broadbills ==
Order: Passeriformes Family: Calyptomenidae

The broadbills are small, brightly coloured birds, which feed on fruit and also take insects in flycatcher fashion, snapping their broad bills. Their habitat is canopies of wet forests.

- African broadbill, Smithornis capensis
- Gray-headed broadbill, Smithornis sharpei
- Rufous-sided broadbill, Smithornis rufolateralis

== Asian and Grauer's broadbills ==
Order: Passeriformes Family: Eurylaimidae

Many of the species are brightly coloured birds that present broad heads, large eyes and a hooked, flat and broad beak.

- Grauer's broadbill, Pseudocalyptomena graueri

== Pittas ==
Order: Passeriformes Family: Pittidae

Pittas are medium-sized by passerine standards and are stocky, with fairly long, strong legs, short tails and stout bills. Many are brightly coloured. They spend the majority of their time on wet forest floors, eating snails, insects and similar invertebrates.

- African pitta, Pitta angolensis
- Green-breasted pitta, Pitta reichenowi

== Cuckooshrikes ==
Order: Passeriformes Family: Campephagidae

The cuckooshrikes are small to medium-sized passerine birds. They are predominantly greyish with white and black, although some species are brightly coloured.

- Grauer's cuckooshrike, Coracina graueri (E)
- Gray cuckooshrike, Coracina caesia
- White-breasted cuckooshrike, Coracina pectoralis
- Oriole cuckooshrike, Lobotos oriolinus
- Black cuckooshrike, Campephaga flava
- Petit's cuckooshrike, Campephaga petiti
- Red-shouldered cuckooshrike, Campephaga phoenicea
- Purple-throated cuckooshrike, Campephaga quiscalina
- Blue cuckooshrike, Coracina azurea

== Old World orioles ==
Order: Passeriformes Family: Oriolidae

The Old World orioles are colourful passerine birds. They are not related to the New World orioles.

- Eurasian golden oriole, Oriolus oriolus
- African golden oriole, Oriolus auratus
- Western black-headed oriole, Oriolus brachyrynchus
- African black-headed oriole, Oriolus larvatus
- Black-tailed oriole, Oriolus percivali
- Black-winged oriole, Oriolus nigripennis

== Wattle-eyes and batises ==
Order: Passeriformes Family: Platysteiridae

The wattle-eyes, or puffback flycatchers, are small stout passerine birds of the African tropics. They get their name from the brightly coloured fleshy eye decorations found in most species in this group.

- Brown-throated wattle-eye, Platysteira cyanea
- Black-throated wattle-eye, Platysteira peltata
- Chestnut wattle-eye, Platysteira castanea
- White-spotted wattle-eye, Platysteira tonsa
- Jameson's wattle-eye, Platysteira jamesoni
- Yellow-bellied wattle-eye, Platysteira concreta
- Boulton's batis, Batis margaritae
- Rwenzori batis, Batis diops
- Chinspot batis, Batis molitor
- Gray-headed batis, Batis orientalis
- Western black-headed batis, Batis erlangeri
- Ituri batis, Batis ituriensis
- Angola batis, Batis minulla

== Vangas, helmetshrikes, and allies ==
Order: Passeriformes Family: Vangidae

The helmetshrikes are similar in build to the shrikes, but tend to be colourful species with distinctive crests or other head ornaments, such as wattles, from which they get their name.

- White helmetshrike, Prionops plumatus
- Yellow-crested helmetshrike, Prionops alberti (E)
- Red-billed helmetshrike, Prionops caniceps
- Rufous-bellied helmetshrike, Prionops rufiventris
- Retz's helmetshrike, Prionops retzii
- African shrike-flycatcher, Megabyas flammulatus
- Black-and-white shrike-flycatcher, Bias musicus

== Bushshrikes and allies ==
Order: Passeriformes Family: Malaconotidae

Bushshrikes are similar in habits to shrikes, hunting insects and other small prey from a perch on a bush. Although similar in build to the shrikes, these tend to be either colourful species or largely black; some species are quite secretive. The Democratic Republic of Congo contains the largest number of bushshrikes of any country.

- Brubru, Nilaus afer
- Northern puffback, Dryoscopus gambensis
- Black-backed puffback, Dryoscopus cubla
- Red-eyed puffback, Dryoscopus senegalensis
- Pink-footed puffback, Dryoscopus angolensis
- Sabine's puffback, Dryoscopus sabini
- Marsh tchagra, Tchagra minuta
- Black-crowned tchagra, Tchagra senegala
- Brown-crowned tchagra, Tchagra australis
- Lühder's bushshrike, Laniarius luehderi
- Braun's bushshrike, Laniarius brauni
- Tropical boubou, Laniarius major
- Gabon boubou, Laniarius bicolor
- Southern boubou, Laniarius ferrugineus
- Black-headed gonolek, Laniarius erythrogaster
- Papyrus gonolek, Laniarius mufumbiri
- Lowland sooty boubou, Laniarius leucorhynchus
- Albertine boubou, Laniarius holomelas
- Fülleborn's boubou, Laniarius fuelleborni
- Gray-green bushshrike, Telophorus bocagei
- Sulphur-breasted bushshrike, Telophorus sulfureopectus
- Many-colored bushshrike, Telophorus multicolor
- Black-fronted bushshrike, Telophorus nigrifrons
- Four-colored bushshrike, Telophorus viridis
- Doherty's bushshrike, Telophorus dohertyi
- Fiery-breasted bushshrike, Malaconotus cruentus
- Lagden's bushshrike, Malaconotus lagdeni
- Gray-headed bushshrike, Malaconotus blanchoti

== Drongos ==
Order: Passeriformes Family: Dicruridae

The drongos are mostly black or dark grey in colour, sometimes with metallic tints. They have long forked tails, and some Asian species have elaborate tail decorations. They have short legs and sit very upright when perched, like a shrike. They flycatch or take prey from the ground.

- Sharpe's drongo, Dicrurus sharpei
- Common square-tailed drongo, Dicrurus ludwigii
- Shining drongo, Dicrurus atripennis
- Fork-tailed drongo, Dicrurus adsimilis
- Glossy-backed drongo, Dicrurus divaricatus
- Velvet-mantled drongo, Dicrurus modestus

== Monarch flycatchers ==
Order: Passeriformes Family: Monarchidae

The monarch flycatchers are small to medium-sized insectivorous passerines which hunt by flycatching.

- Blue-headed crested-flycatcher, Trochocercus nitens
- African crested-flycatcher, Trochocercus cyanomelas
- Black-headed paradise-flycatcher, Terpsiphone rufiventer
- Bedford's paradise-flycatcher, Terpsiphone bedfordi (E)
- Rufous-vented paradise-flycatcher, Terpsiphone rufocinerea
- Bates's paradise-flycatcher, Terpsiphone batesi
- African paradise-flycatcher, Terpsiphone viridis

== Shrikes ==
Order: Passeriformes Family: Laniidae

Shrikes are passerine birds known for their habit of catching other birds and small animals and impaling the uneaten portions of their bodies on thorns. A typical shrike's beak is hooked, like a bird of prey.

- Red-backed shrike, Lanius collurio
- Red-tailed shrike, Lanius phoenicuroides
- Isabelline shrike, Lanius isabellinus (A)
- Emin's shrike, Lanius gubernator
- Lesser gray shrike, Lanius minor
- Gray-backed fiscal, Lanius excubitoroides
- Yellow-billed shrike, Lanius corvinus
- Mackinnon's shrike, Lanius mackinnoni
- Northern fiscal, Lanius humeralis
- Souza's shrike, Lanius souzae
- Masked shrike, Lanius nubicus (A)
- Woodchat shrike, Lanius senator

== Crows, jays, and magpies ==
Order: Passeriformes Family: Corvidae

The family Corvidae includes crows, ravens, jays, choughs, magpies, treepies, nutcrackers and ground jays. Corvids are above average in size among the Passeriformes, and some of the larger species show high levels of intelligence.

- Piapiac, Ptilostomus afer
- Cape crow, Corvus capensis
- Pied crow, Corvus albus
- White-necked raven, Corvus albicollis

== Hyliotas ==
Order: Passeriformes Family: Hyliotidae

The members of this small family, all of genus Hyliota, are birds of the forest canopy. They tend to feed in mixed-species flocks.

- Yellow-bellied hyliota, Hyliota flavigaster
- Southern hyliota, Hyliota australis
- Violet-backed hyliota, Hyliota violacea

== Fairy flycatchers ==
Order: Passeriformes Family: Stenostiridae

Most of the species of this small family are found in Africa, though a few inhabit tropical Asia. They are not closely related to other birds called "flycatchers".

- African blue flycatcher, Elminia longicauda
- White-tailed blue flycatcher, Elminia albicauda
- Dusky crested-flycatcher, Elminia nigromitrata
- White-bellied crested-flycatcher, Elminia albiventris
- White-tailed crested-flycatcher, Elminia albonotata

== Tits, chickadees and titmice ==
Order: Passeriformes Family: Paridae

The Paridae are mainly small stocky woodland species with short stout bills. Some have crests. They are adaptable birds, with a mixed diet including seeds and insects.

- White-shouldered black-tit, Melaniparus guineensis
- White-winged black-tit, Melaniparus leucomelas
- Rufous-bellied tit, Melaniparus rufiventris
- Southern black-tit, Melaniparus niger
- Dusky tit, Melaniparus funereus
- Miombo tit, Melaniparus griseiventris
- Stripe-breasted tit, Melaniparus fasciiventer
- Gray tit, Melaniparus afer

== Penduline-tits ==
Order: Passeriformes Family: Remizidae

The penduline-tits are a group of small passerine birds related to the true tits. They are insectivores.

- Yellow penduline-tit, Anthoscopus parvulus
- Forest penduline-tit, Anthoscopus flavifrons
- African penduline-tit, Anthoscopus caroli

== Larks ==
Order: Passeriformes Family: Alaudidae

Larks are small terrestrial birds with often extravagant songs and display flights. Most larks are fairly dull in appearance. Their food is insects and seeds.

- Spike-heeled lark, Chersomanes albofasciata (A)
- Rufous-rumped lark, Pinarocorys erythropygia
- Dusky lark, Pinarocorys nigricans
- Gray-backed sparrow-lark, Eremopterix verticalis (A)
- Fischer's sparrow-lark, Eremopterix leucopareia
- Sabota lark, Calendulauda sabota
- Rufous-naped lark, Mirafra africana
- Angola lark, Mirafra angolensis
- Flappet lark, Mirafra rufocinnamomea
- White-tailed lark, Mirafra albicauda
- Red-capped lark, Calandrella cinerea
- Greater short-toed lark, Calandrella brachydactyla (A)
- Sun lark, Galerida modesta
- Crested lark, Galerida cristata

== Nicators ==
Order: Passeriformes Family: Nicatoridae

The nicators are shrike-like, with hooked bills. They are endemic to sub-Saharan Africa.

- Western nicator, Nicator chloris
- Eastern nicator, Nicator gularis
- Yellow-throated nicator, Nicator vireo

== African warblers ==
Order: Passeriformes Family: Macrosphenidae

African warblers are small to medium-sized insectivores which are found in a wide variety of habitats south of the Sahara.

- Green crombec, Sylvietta virens
- Lemon-bellied crombec, Sylvietta denti
- White-browed crombec, Sylvietta leucophrys
- Northern crombec, Sylvietta brachyura
- Red-capped crombec, Sylvietta ruficapilla
- Red-faced crombec, Sylvietta whytii (A)
- Cape crombec, Sylvietta rufescens
- Moustached grass-warbler, Melocichla mentalis
- Yellow longbill, Macrosphenus flavicans
- Gray longbill, Macrosphenus concolor
- Grauer's warbler, Graueria vittata
- Green hylia, Hylia prasina
- Tit-hylia, Pholidornis rushiae

== Cisticolas and allies ==
Order: Passeriformes Family: Cisticolidae

The Cisticolidae are warblers found mainly in warmer southern regions of the Old World. They are generally very small birds of drab brown or grey appearance found in open country such as grassland or scrub. The Democratic Republic of the Congo has the greatest diversity of cisticolas of any country.

- Salvadori's eremomela, Eremomela salvadorii
- Yellow-bellied eremomela, Eremomela icteropygialis
- Green-backed eremomela, Eremomela canescens
- Greencap eremomela, Eremomela scotops
- Rufous-crowned eremomela, Eremomela badiceps
- Turner's eremomela, Eremomela turneri
- Black-necked eremomela, Eremomela atricollis
- Red-winged gray warbler, Drymocichla incana
- White-chinned prinia, Schistolais leucopogon
- Black-collared apalis, Oreolais pulchra
- Rwenzori apalis, Oreolais ruwenzori
- Miombo wren-warbler, Calamonastes undosus
- Green-backed camaroptera, Camaroptera brachyura
- Yellow-browed camaroptera, Camaroptera superciliaris
- Olive-green camaroptera, Camaroptera chloronota
- Buff-bellied warbler, Phyllolais pulchella
- Black-capped apalis, Apalis nigriceps
- Black-throated apalis, Apalis jacksoni
- Masked apalis, Apalis binotata
- Black-faced apalis, Apalis personata
- Yellow-breasted apalis, Apalis flavida
- Buff-throated apalis, Apalis rufogularis
- Kungwe apalis, Apalis argentea
- Gosling's apalis, Apalis goslingi
- Kabobo apalis, Apalis kaboboensis (E)
- Chestnut-throated apalis, Apalis porphyrolaema
- Gray apalis, Apalis cinerea
- Brown-headed apalis, Apalis alticola
- Tawny-flanked prinia, Prinia subflava
- Banded prinia, Prinia bairdii
- Red-winged prinia, Prinia erythroptera
- Black-faced rufous-warbler, Bathmocercus rufus
- Oriole warbler, Hypergerus atriceps
- Gray-capped warbler, Eminia lepida
- Red-faced cisticola, Cisticola erythrops
- Singing cisticola, Cisticola cantans
- Whistling cisticola, Cisticola lateralis
- Chattering cisticola, Cisticola anonymus
- Trilling cisticola, Cisticola woosnami
- Bubbling cisticola, Cisticola bulliens
- Chubb's cisticola, Cisticola chubbi
- Rock-loving cisticola, Cisticola aberrans
- Rattling cisticola, Cisticola chiniana
- Tinkling cisticola, Cisticola rufilatus
- Luapula cisticola, Cisticola luapula
- Chirping cisticola, Cisticola pipiens
- Winding cisticola, Cisticola marginatus
- Carruthers's cisticola, Cisticola carruthersi
- Levaillant's cisticola, Cisticola tinniens
- Stout cisticola, Cisticola robustus
- Croaking cisticola, Cisticola natalensis
- Piping cisticola, Cisticola fulvicapillus
- Tabora cisticola, Cisticola angusticaudus
- Slender-tailed cisticola, Cisticola melanurus
- Siffling cisticola, Cisticola brachypterus
- Foxy cisticola, Cisticola troglodytes
- Zitting cisticola, Cisticola juncidis
- Desert cisticola, Cisticola aridulus
- Cloud cisticola, Cisticola textrix
- Black-backed cisticola, Cisticola eximius
- Cloud-scraping cisticola, Cisticola dambo
- Pale-crowned cisticola, Cisticola cinnamomeus
- Wing-snapping cisticola, Cisticola ayresii

== Reed warblers and allies ==
Order: Passeriformes Family: Acrocephalidae

The members of this family are usually rather large for "warblers". Most are rather plain olivaceous brown above with much yellow to beige below. They are usually found in open woodland, reedbeds, or tall grass. The family occurs mostly in southern to western Eurasia and surroundings, but it also ranges far into the Pacific, with some species in Africa.

- Papyrus yellow-warbler, Calamonastides gracilirostris
- Eastern olivaceous warbler, Iduna pallida
- African yellow-warbler, Iduna natalensis
- Mountain yellow-warbler, Iduna similis
- Olive-tree warbler, Hippolais olivetorum (A)
- Icterine warbler, Hippolais icterina
- Sedge warbler, Acrocephalus schoenobaenus
- Marsh warbler, Acrocephalus palustris
- Common reed warbler, Acrocephalus scirpaceus
- Lesser swamp warbler, Acrocephalus gracilirostris
- Greater swamp warbler, Acrocephalus rufescens
- Great reed warbler, Acrocephalus arundinaceus

== Grassbirds and allies ==
Order: Passeriformes Family: Locustellidae

Locustellidae are a family of small insectivorous songbirds found mainly in Eurasia, Africa, and the Australian region. They are smallish birds with tails that are usually long and pointed, and tend to be drab brownish or buffy all over.

- Bamboo warbler, Locustella alfredi
- River warbler, Locustella fluviatilis (A)
- Fan-tailed grassbird, Catriscus brevirostris
- Evergreen-forest warbler, Bradypterus lopezi
- Cinnamon bracken-warbler, Bradypterus cinnamomeus
- Little rush warbler, Bradypterus baboecala
- White-winged swamp warbler, Bradypterus carpalis
- Grauer's swamp warbler, Bradypterus graueri
- Highland rush warbler, Bradypterus centralis

== Swallows ==
Order: Passeriformes Family: Hirundinidae

The family Hirundinidae is adapted to aerial feeding. They have a slender streamlined body, long pointed wings and a short bill with a wide gape. The feet are adapted to perching rather than walking, and the front toes are partially joined at the base. The Democratic Republic of Congo contains the largest number of swallows of any country on earth.

- African river martin, Pseudochelidon eurystomina
- Plain martin, Riparia paludicola
- Congo martin, Riparia congica (E)
- Bank swallow, Riparia riparia
- Banded martin, Neophedina cincta
- Brazza's martin, Phedinopsis brazzae
- Rock martin, Ptyonoprogne fuligula
- Barn swallow, Hirundo rustica
- Red-chested swallow, Hirundo lucida
- Angola swallow, Hirundo angolensis
- White-throated blue swallow, Hirundo nigrita
- White-throated swallow, Hirundo albigularis
- Wire-tailed swallow, Hirundo smithii
- Pearl-breasted swallow, Hirundo dimidiata
- Montane blue swallow, Hirundo atrocaerulea
- Black-and-rufous swallow, Hirundo nigrorufa
- Greater striped swallow, Cecropis cucullata
- Red-rumped swallow, Cecropis daurica
- Lesser striped swallow, Cecropis abyssinica
- Rufous-chested swallow, Cecropis semirufa
- Mosque swallow, Cecropis senegalensis
- Red-throated swallow, Petrochelidon rufigula
- Preuss's swallow, Petrochelidon preussi
- South African swallow, Petrochelidon spilodera
- Common house-martin, Delichon urbicum
- Square-tailed sawwing, Psalidoprocne nitens
- White-headed sawwing, Psalidoprocne albiceps
- Black sawwing, Psalidoprocne pristoptera
- Gray-rumped swallow, Pseudhirundo griseopyga

== Bulbuls ==
Order: Passeriformes Family: Pycnonotidae

Bulbuls are medium-sized songbirds. Some are colourful with yellow, red or orange vents, cheeks, throats or supercilia, but most are drab, with uniform olive-brown to black plumage. Some species have distinct crests. The Democratic Republic of Congo contains the largest number of bulbuls of any country on earth.

- Slender-billed greenbul, Stelgidillas gracilirostris
- Golden greenbul, Calyptocichla serinus
- Black-collared bulbul, Neolestes torquatus
- Red-tailed bristlebill, Bleda syndactylus
- Lesser bristlebill, Bleda notatus
- Shelley's greenbul, Arizelocichla masukuensis
- Eastern mountain greenbul, Arizelocichla nigriceps
- Simple greenbul, Chlorocichla simplex
- Yellow-necked greenbul, Chlorocichla falkensteini
- Yellow-bellied greenbul, Chlorocichla flaviventris
- Joyful greenbul, Chlorocichla laetissima
- Prigogine's greenbul, Chlorocichla prigoginei (E)
- Honeyguide greenbul, Baeopogon indicator
- Sjostedt's greenbul, Baeopogon clamans
- Yellow-throated greenbul, Atimastillas flavicollis
- Spotted greenbul, Ixonotus guttatus
- Swamp greenbul, Thescelocichla leucopleura
- Red-tailed greenbul, Criniger calurus
- Eastern bearded-greenbul, Criniger chloronotus
- Yellow-bearded greenbul, Criniger olivaceus
- White-bearded greenbul, Criniger ndussumensis
- Gray greenbul, Eurillas gracilis
- Ansorge's greenbul, Eurillas ansorgei
- Plain greenbul, Eurillas curvirostris
- Yellow-whiskered bulbul, Eurillas latirostris
- Little greenbul, Eurillas virens
- Leaf-love, Phyllastrephus scandens
- Terrestrial brownbul, Phyllastrephus terrestris
- Pale-olive greenbul, Phyllastrephus fulviventris
- Gray-olive greenbul, Phyllastrephus cerviniventris
- Baumann's greenbul, Phyllastrephus baumanni
- Toro olive-greenbul, Phyllastrephus hypochloris
- Fischer's greenbul, Phyllastrephus fischeri
- Cabanis's greenbul, Phyllastrephus cabanisi
- Icterine greenbul, Phyllastrephus icterinus
- Sassi's greenbul, Phyllastrephus lorenzi (E)
- Xavier's greenbul, Phyllastrephus xavieri
- White-throated greenbul, Phyllastrephus albigularis
- Yellow-streaked bulbul, Phyllastrephus flavostriatus
- Common bulbul, Pycnonotus barbatus

== Leaf warblers ==
Order: Passeriformes Family: Phylloscopidae

Leaf warblers are a family of small insectivorous birds found mostly in Eurasia and ranging into Wallacea and Africa. The species are of various sizes, often green-plumaged above and yellow below, or more subdued with grayish-green to grayish-brown colors.

- Wood warbler, Phylloscopus sibilatrix
- Willow warbler, Phylloscopus trochilus
- Common chiffchaff, Phylloscopus collybita (A)
- Brown woodland-warbler, Phylloscopus umbrovirens
- Red-faced woodland-warbler, Phylloscopus laetus
- Laura's woodland-warbler, Phylloscopus laurae
- Uganda woodland-warbler, Phylloscopus budongoensis

== Bush warblers and allies ==
Order: Passeriformes Family: Scotocercidae

The members of this family are found throughout Africa, Asia, and Polynesia. Their taxonomy is in flux, and some authorities place genus Erythrocerus in another family.

- Chestnut-capped flycatcher, Erythrocercus mccallii
- Neumann's warbler, Urosphena neumanni

== Sylviid warblers, parrotbills, and allies ==
Order: Passeriformes Family: Sylviidae

The family Sylviidae is a group of small insectivorous passerine birds. They mainly occur as breeding species, as the common name implies, in Europe, Asia and, to a lesser extent, Africa. Most are of generally undistinguished appearance, but many have distinctive songs.

- Eurasian blackcap, Sylvia atricapilla
- Garden warbler, Sylvia borin
- African hill babbler, Sylvia abyssinica
- Rwenzori hill babbler, Sylvia atriceps
- Barred warbler, Curruca nisoria (A)
- Brown parisoma, Curruca lugens
- Greater whitethroat, Curruca communis

== White-eyes, yuhinas, and allies ==
Order: Passeriformes Family: Zosteropidae

The white-eyes are small and mostly undistinguished, their plumage above being generally some dull colour like greenish-olive, but some species have a white or bright yellow throat, breast or lower parts, and several have buff flanks. As their name suggests, many species have a white ring around each eye.

- Green white-eye, Zosterops stuhlmanni
- Northern yellow white-eye, Zosterops senegalensis
- Southern yellow white-eye, Zosterops anderssoni

== Ground babblers and allies ==
Order: Passeriformes Family: Pellorneidae

These small to medium-sized songbirds have soft fluffy plumage but are otherwise rather diverse. Members of the genus Illadopsis are found in forests, but some other genera are birds of scrublands.

- Brown illadopsis, Illadopsis fulvescens
- Pale-breasted illadopsis, Illadopsis rufipennis
- Mountain illadopsis, Illadopsis pyrrhoptera
- Blackcap illadopsis, Illadopsis cleaveri (A)
- Scaly-breasted illadopsis, Illadopsis albipectus
- Thrush babbler, Illadopsis turdina
- Puvel's illadopsis, Illadopsis puveli

== Laughingthrushes and allies ==
Order: Passeriformes Family: Leiothrichidae

The members of this family are diverse in size and coloration, though those of genus Turdoides tend to be brown or grayish. The family is found in Africa, India, and southeast Asia.

- Capuchin babbler, Turdoides atripennis
- Chapin's mountain-babbler, Turdoides chapini (E)
- Red-collared mountain-babbler, Turdoides rufocinctus (E)
- Brown babbler, Turdoides plebejus
- Arrow-marked babbler, Turdoides jardineii
- Blackcap babbler, Turdoides reinwardtii (A)
- Dusky babbler, Turdoides tenebrosus
- Hartlaub's babbler, Turdoides hartlaubii
- Black-lored babbler, Turdoides sharpei
- Black-faced babbler, Turdoides melanops

== Treecreepers ==
Order: Passeriformes Family: Certhiidae

Treecreepers are small woodland birds, brown above and white below. They have thin pointed down-curved bills, which they use to extricate insects from bark. They have stiff tail feathers, like woodpeckers, which they use to support themselves on vertical trees.

- African spotted creeper, Salpornis salvadori

== Oxpeckers ==
Order: Passeriformes Family: Buphagidae

As both the English and scientific names of these birds imply, they feed on ectoparasites, primarily ticks, found on large mammals.

- Red-billed oxpecker, Buphagus erythrorhynchus
- Yellow-billed oxpecker, Buphagus africanus

== Starlings ==
Order: Passeriformes Family: Sturnidae

Starlings are small to medium-sized passerine birds. Their flight is strong and direct and they are very gregarious. Their preferred habitat is fairly open country. They eat insects and fruit. Plumage is typically dark with a metallic sheen.

- Wattled starling, Creatophora cinerea
- Violet-backed starling, Cinnyricinclus leucogaster
- Slender-billed starling, Onychognathus tenuirostris
- Neumann's starling, Onychognathus neumanni
- Red-winged starling, Onychognathus morio
- Chestnut-winged starling, Onychognathus fulgidus
- Waller's starling, Onychognathus walleri
- White-collared starling, Grafisia torquata
- Sharpe's starling, Pholia sharpii
- Narrow-tailed starling, Poeoptera lugubris
- Stuhlmann's starling, Poeoptera stuhlmanni
- Purple-headed starling, Hylopsar purpureiceps
- Rüppell's starling, Lamprotornis purpuropterus
- Splendid starling, Lamprotornis splendidus
- Lesser blue-eared starling, Lamprotornis chloropterus
- Sharp-tailed starling, Lamprotornis acuticaudus
- Greater blue-eared starling, Lamprotornis chalybaeus
- Purple starling, Lamprotornis purpureus
- Cape starling, Lamprotornis nitens (A)
- Bronze-tailed starling, Lamprotornis chalcurus

== Thrushes and allies ==
Order: Passeriformes Family: Turdidae

The thrushes are a group of passerine birds that occur mainly in the Old World. They are plump, soft plumaged, small to medium-sized insectivores or sometimes omnivores, often feeding on the ground. Many have attractive songs.

- Rufous flycatcher-thrush, Neocossyphus fraseri
- Red-tailed ant-thrush, Neocossyphus rufus
- White-tailed ant thrush, Neocossyphus poensis
- Spotted ground-thrush, Geokichla guttata (A)
- Black-eared ground-thrush, Geokichla camaronensis
- Gray ground-thrush, Geokichla princei
- Crossley's ground-thrush, Geokichla crossleyi
- Oberländer's ground-thrush, Geokichla oberlaenderi
- Abyssinian ground-thrush, Geokichla piaggiae
- Orange ground-thrush, Geokichla gurneyi
- Groundscraper thrush, Turdus litsitsirupa
- Abyssinian thrush, Turdus abyssinicus
- Kurrichane thrush, Turdus libonyana
- African thrush, Turdus pelios

== Old World flycatchers ==
Order: Passeriformes Family: Muscicapidae

Old World flycatchers are a large group of small passerine birds native to the Old World. They are mainly small arboreal insectivores. The appearance of these birds is highly varied, but they mostly have weak songs and harsh calls.

- African dusky flycatcher, Muscicapa adusta
- Little flycatcher, Muscicapa epulata
- Yellow-footed flycatcher, Muscicapa sethsmithi
- Spotted flycatcher, Muscicapa striata
- Gambaga flycatcher, Muscicapa gambagae
- Swamp flycatcher, Muscicapa aquatica
- Cassin's flycatcher, Muscicapa cassini
- Böhm's flycatcher, Muscicapa boehmi
- Sooty flycatcher, Muscicapa infuscata
- Dusky-blue flycatcher, Muscicapa comitata
- Pale flycatcher, Agricola pallidus
- White-browed forest-flycatcher, Fraseria cinerascens
- African forest-flycatcher, Fraseria ocreata
- Gray-throated tit-flycatcher, Fraseria griseigularis
- Gray tit-flycatcher, Fraseria plumbea
- Olivaceous flycatcher, Fraseria olivascens
- Chapin's flycatcher, Fraseria lendu
- Tessmann's flycatcher, Fraseria tessmanni
- Ashy flycatcher, Fraseria caerulescens
- Yellow-eyed black-flycatcher, Melaenornis ardesiacus (E)
- Northern black-flycatcher, Melaenornis edolioides
- Southern black-flycatcher, Melaenornis pammelaina
- White-eyed slaty-flycatcher, Melaenornis fischeri
- Fire-crested alethe, Alethe castanea
- Forest scrub-robin, Cercotrichas leucosticta
- Miombo scrub-robin, Cercotrichas barbata
- Rufous-tailed scrub-robin, Cercotrichas galactotes (A)
- Brown-backed scrub-robin, Cercotrichas hartlaubi
- Red-backed scrub-robin, Cercotrichas leucophrys
- White-bellied robin-chat, Cossyphicula roberti
- Archer's robin-chat, Cossypha archeri
- Cape robin-chat, Cossypha caffra
- Blue-shouldered robin-chat, Cossypha cyanocampter
- Gray-winged robin-chat, Cossypha polioptera
- White-browed robin-chat, Cossypha heuglini
- Red-capped robin-chat, Cossypha natalensis
- White-headed robin-chat, Cossypha heinrichi
- Snowy-crowned robin-chat, Cossypha niveicapilla
- Collared palm-thrush, Cichladusa arquata
- Rufous-tailed palm-thrush, Cichladusa ruficauda
- Spotted morning-thrush, Cichladusa guttata
- White-starred robin, Pogonocichla stellata
- Brown-chested alethe, Chamaetylas poliocephala
- Red-throated alethe, Chamaetylas poliophrys
- Yellow-breasted forest robin, Stiphrornis mabirae
- Short-tailed akalat, Sheppardia poensis
- Bocage's akalat, Sheppardia bocagei
- Lowland akalat, Sheppardia cyornithopsis
- Equatorial akalat, Sheppardia aequatorialis
- Thrush nightingale, Luscinia luscinia
- Common nightingale, Luscinia megarhynchos
- Semicollared flycatcher, Ficedula semitorquata
- European pied flycatcher, Ficedula hypoleuca
- Collared flycatcher, Ficedula albicollis
- Common redstart, Phoenicurus phoenicurus
- Rufous-tailed rock-thrush, Monticola saxatilis
- Miombo rock-thrush, Monticola angolensis
- Whinchat, Saxicola rubetra
- African stonechat, Saxicola torquatus
- Mocking cliff-chat, Thamnolaea cinnamomeiventris
- Sooty chat, Myrmecocichla nigra
- Congo moor chat, Myrmecocichla tholloni
- Arnot's chat, Myrmecocichla arnotti
- Northern wheatear, Oenanthe oenanthe
- Capped wheatear, Oenanthe pileata
- Isabelline wheatear, Oenanthe isabellina
- White-fronted black-chat, Oenanthe albifrons
- Familiar chat, Oenanthe familiaris

== Dapple-throat and allies ==
Order: Passeriformes Family: Modulatricidae

This species and two others, all of different genera, were formerly placed in family Promeropidae, the sugarbirds, but were accorded their own family in 2017.

- Gray-chested babbler, Kakamega poliothorax

== Sunbirds and spiderhunters ==
Order: Passeriformes Family: Nectariniidae

The sunbirds and spiderhunters are very small passerine birds which feed largely on nectar, although they will also take insects, especially when feeding young. Flight is fast and direct on their short wings. Most species can take nectar by hovering like a hummingbird, but usually perch to feed. The Democratic Republic of Congo contains the largest number of sunbirds of any country on earth.

- Fraser's sunbird, Deleornis fraseri
- Gray-headed sunbird, Deleornis axillaris
- Anchieta's sunbird, Anthreptes anchietae
- Mouse-brown sunbird, Anthreptes gabonicus
- Western violet-backed sunbird, Anthreptes longuemarei
- Violet-tailed sunbird, Anthreptes aurantius
- Little green sunbird, Anthreptes seimundi
- Green sunbird, Anthreptes rectirostris
- Collared sunbird, Hedydipna collaris
- Pygmy sunbird, Hedydipna platura
- Reichenbach's sunbird, Anabathmis reichenbachii
- Green-headed sunbird, Cyanomitra verticalis
- Bannerman's sunbird, Cyanomitra bannermani
- Blue-throated brown sunbird, Cyanomitra cyanolaema
- Blue-headed sunbird, Cyanomitra alinae
- Olive sunbird, Cyanomitra olivacea
- Carmelite sunbird, Chalcomitra fuliginosa
- Green-throated sunbird, Chalcomitra rubescens
- Amethyst sunbird, Chalcomitra amethystina
- Scarlet-chested sunbird, Chalcomitra senegalensis
- Bocage's sunbird, Nectarinia bocagii
- Purple-breasted sunbird, Nectarinia purpureiventris
- Bronze sunbird, Nectarinia kilimensis
- Malachite sunbird, Nectarinia famosa
- Red-tufted sunbird, Nectarinia johnstoni
- Golden-winged sunbird, Drepanorhynchus reichenowi
- Olive-bellied sunbird, Cinnyris chloropygius
- Tiny sunbird, Cinnyris minullus
- Western miombo sunbird, Cinnyris gertrudis
- Eastern miombo sunbird, Cinnyris manoensis
- Stuhlmann's sunbird, Cinnyris stuhlmanni
- Prigogine's sunbird, Cinnyris prigoginei (E)
- Northern double-collared sunbird, Cinnyris preussi
- Greater double-collared sunbird, Cinnyris afer
- Regal sunbird, Cinnyris regius
- Rockefeller's sunbird, Cinnyris rockefelleri (E)
- Beautiful sunbird, Cinnyris pulchellus
- Mariqua sunbird, Cinnyris mariquensis (A)
- Shelley's sunbird, Cinnyris shelleyi
- Congo sunbird, Cinnyris congensis (E)
- Red-chested sunbird, Cinnyris erythrocerca
- Purple-banded sunbird, Cinnyris bifasciatus
- Orange-tufted sunbird, Cinnyris bouvieri
- Palestine sunbird, Cinnyris oseus
- Splendid sunbird, Cinnyris coccinigaster
- Johanna's sunbird, Cinnyris johannae
- Superb sunbird, Cinnyris superbus
- White-breasted sunbird, Cinnyris talatala
- Variable sunbird, Cinnyris venustus
- Bates's sunbird, Cinnyris batesi
- Copper sunbird, Cinnyris cupreus

== Weavers and allies ==
Order: Passeriformes Family: Ploceidae

The weavers are small passerine birds related to the finches. They are seed-eating birds with rounded conical bills. The males of many species are brightly coloured, usually in red or yellow and black, some species show variation in colour only in the breeding season. The Democratic Republic of the Congo has the greatest diversity of weavers of any country.

- Chestnut-crowned sparrow-weaver, Plocepasser superciliosus
- Chestnut-backed sparrow-weaver, Plocepasser rufoscapulatus
- Red-crowned malimbe, Malimbus coronatus
- Black-throated malimbe, Malimbus cassini
- Red-bellied malimbe, Malimbus erythrogaster
- Blue-billed malimbe, Malimbus nitens
- Crested malimbe, Malimbus malimbicus
- Red-headed malimbe, Malimbus rubricollis
- Red-headed weaver, Anaplectes rubriceps
- Yellow-legged weaver, Ploceus flavipes (E)
- Baglafecht weaver, Ploceus baglafecht
- Black-chinned weaver, Ploceus nigrimentus
- Little weaver, Ploceus luteolus
- Slender-billed weaver, Ploceus pelzelni
- Loango weaver, Ploceus subpersonatus
- Black-necked weaver, Ploceus nigricollis
- Spectacled weaver, Ploceus ocularis
- Black-billed weaver, Ploceus melanogaster
- Strange weaver, Ploceus alienus
- Bocage's weaver, Ploceus temporalis
- Holub's golden-weaver, Ploceus xanthops
- Orange weaver, Ploceus aurantius
- Northern brown-throated weaver, Ploceus castanops
- Northern masked-weaver, Ploceus taeniopterus
- Lesser masked-weaver, Ploceus intermedius
- Southern masked weaver, Ploceus velatus
- Vitelline masked-weaver, Ploceus vitellinus
- Tanganyika masked-weaver, Ploceus reichardi
- Katanga masked-weaver, Ploceus katangae
- Lake Lufira masked-weaver, Ploceus ruweti (E)
- Heuglin's masked-weaver, Ploceus heuglini
- Vieillot's black weaver, Ploceus nigerrimus
- Village weaver, Ploceus cucullatus
- Weyns's weaver, Ploceus weynsi
- Black-headed weaver, Ploceus melanocephalus
- Golden-naped weaver, Ploceus aureonucha (E)
- Yellow-mantled weaver, Ploceus tricolor
- Maxwell's black weaver, Ploceus albinucha
- Forest weaver, Ploceus bicolor
- Brown-capped weaver, Ploceus insignis
- Yellow-capped weaver, Ploceus dorsomaculatus
- Preuss's weaver, Ploceus preussi
- Bar-winged weaver, Ploceus angolensis
- Compact weaver, Pachyphantes superciliosus
- Cardinal quelea, Quelea cardinalis
- Red-headed quelea, Quelea erythrops
- Red-billed quelea, Quelea quelea
- Bob-tailed weaver, Brachycope anomala
- Northern red bishop, Euplectes franciscanus
- Southern red bishop, Euplectes orix
- Black-winged bishop, Euplectes hordeaceus
- Black bishop, Euplectes gierowii
- Yellow-crowned bishop, Euplectes afer
- Yellow bishop, Euplectes capensis
- White-winged widowbird, Euplectes albonotatus
- Yellow-mantled widowbird, Euplectes macroura
- Red-collared widowbird, Euplectes ardens
- Fan-tailed widowbird, Euplectes axillaris
- Marsh widowbird, Euplectes hartlaubi
- Buff-shouldered widowbird, Euplectes psammocromius
- Long-tailed widowbird, Euplectes progne
- Grosbeak weaver, Amblyospiza albifrons

== Waxbills and allies ==
Order: Passeriformes Family: Estrildidae

The estrildid finches are small passerine birds of the Old World tropics and Australasia. They are gregarious and often colonial seed eaters with short thick but pointed bills. They are all similar in structure and habits, but have wide variation in plumage colours and patterns. The Democratic Republic of the Congo has the greatest diversity of estrildid finches of any country.

- Bronze mannikin, Spermestes cucullatus
- Magpie mannikin, Spermestes fringilloides
- Black-and-white mannikin, Spermestes bicolor
- White-collared oliveback, Nesocharis ansorgei
- Yellow-bellied waxbill, Coccopygia quartinia
- Green-backed twinspot, Mandingoa nitidula
- Shelley's crimsonwing, Cryptospiza shelleyi
- Dusky crimsonwing, Cryptospiza jacksoni
- Abyssinian crimsonwing, Cryptospiza salvadorii
- Red-faced crimsonwing, Cryptospiza reichenovii
- Woodhouse's antpecker, Parmoptila woodhousei
- Jameson's antpecker, Parmoptila jamesoni
- White-breasted nigrita, Nigrita fusconotus
- Chestnut-breasted nigrita, Nigrita bicolor
- Gray-headed nigrita, Nigrita canicapillus
- Pale-fronted nigrita, Nigrita luteifrons
- Gray-headed oliveback, Delacourella capistrata
- Black-tailed waxbill, Glaucestrilda perreini
- Black-crowned waxbill, Estrilda nonnula
- Black-headed waxbill, Estrilda atricapilla
- Kandt's waxbill, Estrilda kandti
- Orange-cheeked waxbill, Estrilda melpoda
- Fawn-breasted waxbill, Estrilda paludicola
- Common waxbill, Estrilda astrild
- Black-lored waxbill, Estrilda nigriloris (E)
- Black-rumped waxbill, Estrilda troglodytes
- Crimson-rumped waxbill, Estrilda rhodopyga
- Quailfinch, Ortygospiza atricollis
- Locustfinch, Paludipasser locustella
- Zebra waxbill, Amandava subflava
- Southern cordonbleu, Uraeginthus angolensis
- Red-cheeked cordonbleu, Uraeginthus bengalus
- Grant's bluebill, Spermophaga poliogenys
- Western bluebill, Spermophaga haematina
- Red-headed bluebill, Spermophaga ruficapilla
- Black-bellied seedcracker, Pyrenestes ostrinus
- Green-winged pytilia, Pytilia melba
- Orange-winged pytilia, Pytilia afra
- Red-winged pytilia, Pytilia phoenicoptera
- Red-faced pytilia, Pytilia hypogrammica
- Dybowski's twinspot, Euschistospiza dybowskii
- Dusky twinspot, Euschistospiza cinereovinacea
- Peters's twinspot, Hypargos niveoguttatus
- Brown twinspot, Clytospiza monteiri
- Red-billed firefinch, Lagonosticta senegala
- African firefinch, Lagonosticta rubricata
- Jameson's firefinch, Lagonosticta rhodopareia
- Black-bellied firefinch, Lagonosticta rara
- Bar-breasted firefinch, Lagonosticta rufopicta
- Brown firefinch, Lagonosticta nitidula
- Black-faced firefinch, Lagonosticta larvata

== Indigobirds ==
Order: Passeriformes Family: Viduidae

The indigobirds are finch-like species which usually have black or indigo predominating in their plumage. All are brood parasites, which lay their eggs in the nests of estrildid finches.

- Pin-tailed whydah, Vidua macroura
- Exclamatory paradise-whydah, Vidua interjecta
- Broad-tailed paradise-whydah, Vidua obtusa
- Eastern paradise-whydah, Vidua paradisaea
- Village indigobird, Vidua chalybeata
- Wilson's indigobird, Vidua wilsoni
- Jambandu indigobird, Vidua raricola
- Baka indigobird, Vidua larvaticola
- Cameroon indigobird, Vidua camerunensis
- Variable indigobird, Vidua funerea
- Purple indigobird, Vidua purpurascens
- Green indigobird, Vidua codringtoni (A)
- Parasitic weaver, Anomalospiza imberbis

== Old World sparrows ==
Order: Passeriformes Family: Passeridae

Old World sparrows are small passerine birds. In general, sparrows tend to be small, plump, brown or grey birds with short tails and short powerful beaks. Sparrows are seed eaters, but they also consume small insects.

- House sparrow, Passer domesticus (I)
- Northern gray-headed sparrow, Passer griseus
- Yellow-throated bush sparrow, Gymnoris superciliaris

== Wagtails and pipits ==
Order: Passeriformes Family: Motacillidae

Motacillidae is a family of small passerine birds with medium to long tails. They include the wagtails, longclaws and pipits. They are slender, ground feeding insectivores of open country.

- Cape wagtail, Motacilla capensis
- Mountain wagtail, Motacilla clara
- Gray wagtail, Motacilla cinerea
- Western yellow wagtail, Motacilla flava
- African pied wagtail, Motacilla aguimp
- White wagtail, Motacilla alba
- Richard's pipit, Anthus richardi
- African pipit, Anthus cinnamomeus
- Mountain pipit, Anthus hoeschi
- Woodland pipit, Anthus nyassae
- Long-billed pipit, Anthus similis
- Plain-backed pipit, Anthus leucophrys
- Buffy pipit, Anthus vaalensis
- Long-legged pipit, Anthus pallidiventris
- Striped pipit, Anthus lineiventris
- Tree pipit, Anthus trivialis
- Red-throated pipit, Anthus cervinus
- Short-tailed pipit, Anthus brachyurus
- Yellow-throated longclaw, Macronyx croceus
- Fuelleborn's longclaw, Macronyx fuelleborni
- Rosy-throated longclaw, Macronyx ameliae
- Grimwood's longclaw, Macronyx grimwoodi

== Finches, euphonias, and allies ==
Order: Passeriformes Family: Fringillidae

Finches are seed-eating passerine birds, that are small to moderately large and have a strong beak, usually conical and in some species very large. All have twelve tail feathers and nine primaries. These birds have a bouncing flight with alternating bouts of flapping and gliding on closed wings, and most sing well.

- Oriole finch, Linurgus olivaceus
- White-rumped seedeater, Crithagra leucopygia
- Yellow-fronted canary, Crithagra mozambica
- Western citril, Crithagra frontalis
- Black-faced canary, Crithagra capistrata
- Papyrus canary, Crithagra koliensis
- Black-throated canary, Crithagra atrogularis
- Brimstone canary, Crithagra sulphurata
- Streaky seedeater, Crithagra striolata
- Thick-billed seedeater, Crithagra burtoni
- Black-eared seedeater, Crithagra mennelli
- West African seedeater, Crithagra canicapilla
- Streaky-headed seedeater, Crithagra gularis (A)
- Reichard's seedeater, Crithagra reichardi
- Yellow-crowned canary, Serinus flavivertex

== Old World buntings ==
Order: Passeriformes Family: Emberizidae

The emberizids are a large family of passerine birds. They are seed-eating birds with distinctively shaped bills. Many emberizid species have distinctive head patterns.

- Brown-rumped bunting, Emberiza affinis
- Cabanis's bunting, Emberiza cabanisi
- Golden-breasted bunting, Emberiza flaviventris
- Lark-like bunting, Emberiza impetuani (A)
- Cinnamon-breasted bunting, Emberiza tahapisi
- Gosling's bunting, Emberiza goslingi

== See also ==
- List of birds
- Lists of birds by region
- List of amphibians of the Democratic Republic of the Congo
- List of mammals of the Democratic Republic of the Congo
