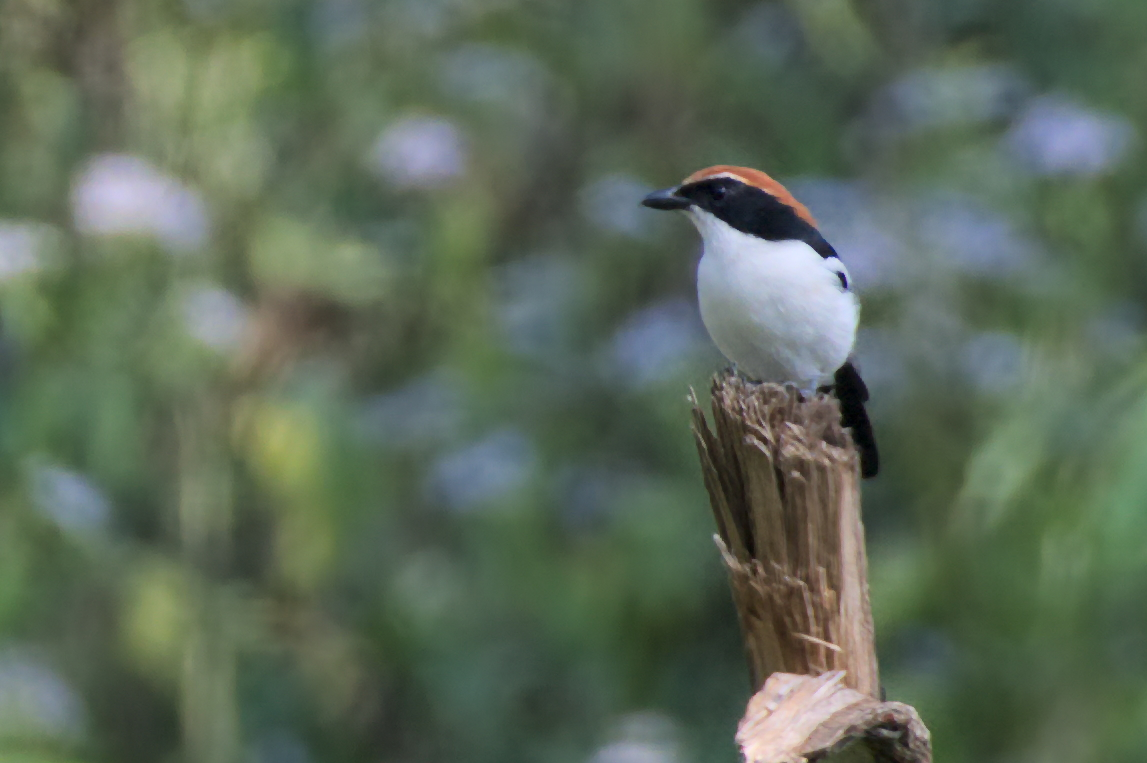

Conservation status
- Endangered (IUCN 3.1)

Scientific classification
- Kingdom: Animalia
- Phylum: Chordata
- Class: Aves
- Order: Passeriformes
- Family: Malaconotidae
- Genus: Laniarius
- Species: L. amboimensis

Binomial name
- Laniarius amboimensis Moltoni, 1932

Synonyms
- Laniarius luehderi amboimensis

= Gabela bushshrike =

Species of bird

The Gabela bushshrike (Laniarius amboimensis) or Amboim bushshrike is a bird in the family Malaconotidae. It is a reclusive and enigmatic bird, and it is not quite resolved whether it should better be considered a distinct species or a well-marked subspecies of Lühder's bushshrike. It is endemic to Angola.

Its natural habitat is subtropical or tropical moist montane forests. It is threatened by habitat loss.
