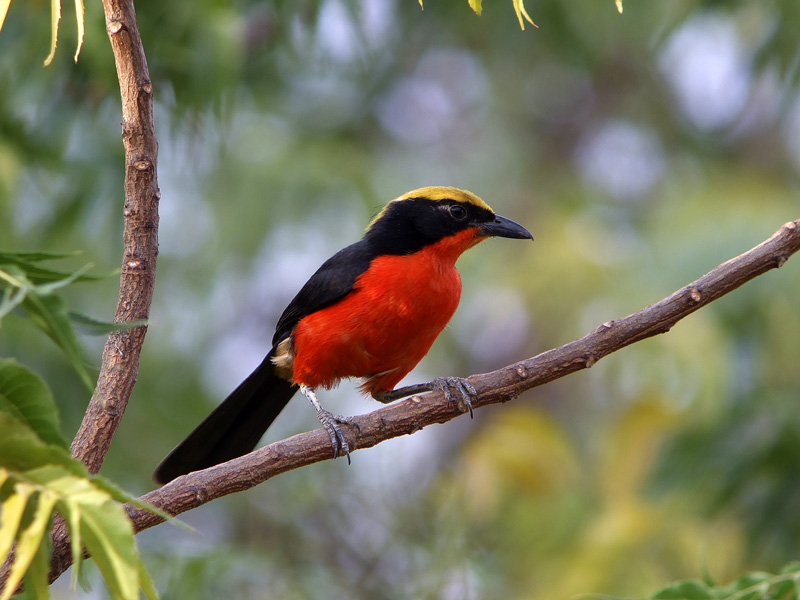
- Yellow-crowned gonolek Laniarius barbarus

Scientific classification
- Kingdom: Animalia
- Phylum: Chordata
- Class: Aves
- Order: Passeriformes
- Family: Malaconotidae
- Genus: Laniarius; Vieillot, 1816

Type species
- Lanius barbarus Linnaeus, 1766

Species
- see text

= Laniarius =

Laniarus

Genus of birds

Laniarius is a genus of brightly coloured, carnivorous passerine birds commonly known as boubous or gonoleks. Not to be confused with the similar-sounding genus Lanius, they were formerly classed with the true shrikes in the family Laniidae, but they and related genera are now considered sufficiently distinctive to be separated from that group as the bush-shrike family Malaconotidae.

This is an African group of species which are found in scrub or open woodland. They are similar in habits to shrikes, hunting insects and other small prey from a perch on a bush. Although similar in build to the shrikes, these tend to be either colourful species or largely black. Some species are also quite secretive.

== Taxonomy and systematics ==
The genus Laniarius was introduced by the French ornithologist Louis Pierre Vieillot in 1816 to accommodate a single species, the yellow-crowned gonolek, which is therefore the type species.

The closest relatives of the genus appear to be the genus Chlorophoneus. Previously, members of the genus Laniarius had been classified on the basis of plumage. However, a 2008 molecular study found that the species had developed different colours and patterns in plumage independently and similar-coloured species were often unrelated. The authors hypothesized that the ancestor of the genus may have been dark-coloured.

There are 22 recognised species:

Image	Common name	Scientific name	Distribution
	Lowland sooty boubou	Laniarius leucorhynchus	Angola, Benin, Cameroon, Central African Republic, Republic of the Congo, Democratic Republic of the Congo, Ivory Coast, Equatorial Guinea, Gabon, Ghana, Guinea, Guinea-Bissau, Liberia, Nigeria, Sierra Leone, South Sudan, Togo, and Uganda.
	Mountain sooty boubou	Laniarius poensis	Western High Plateau & Bioko
	Albertine sooty boubou	Laniarius holomelas	Albertine Rift montane forests.
	Willard’s sooty boubou	Laniarius willardi	Albertine Rift montane forests.
	Fuelleborn's boubou	Laniarius fuelleborni	Malawi, Tanzania, and Zambia
	Slate-colored boubou	Laniarius funebris	Ethiopia, Kenya, Rwanda, Somalia, South Sudan, Tanzania, and Uganda.
	Lühder's bushshrike	Laniarius luehderi	Angola, Burundi, Cameroon, Republic of the Congo, Democratic Republic of the Congo, Equatorial Guinea, Gabon, Kenya, Nigeria, Rwanda, South Sudan, Tanzania, and Uganda.
	Braun's bushshrike	Laniarius brauni	Angola
	Gabela bushshrike	Laniarius amboimensis	Angola.
	Red-naped bushshrike	Laniarius ruficeps	Ethiopia, Kenya, and Somalia
	Black boubou	Laniarius nigerrimus	Somalia and northern Kenya.
	Ethiopian boubou	Laniarius aethiopicus	Eritrea, Ethiopia, northwest Somalia, and northern Kenya.
	Tropical boubou	Laniarius major	sub-Saharan Africa
	East Coast boubou	Laniarius sublacteus	southeast Somalia to northeast Tanzania, and Zanzibar island.
	Southern boubou	Laniarius ferrugineus	southeastern Zimbabwe, eastern Botswana, Mozambique and southern and eastern South Africa
	Swamp boubou	Laniarius bicolor	Angola, Botswana, Cameroon, Republic of the Congo, DRC, Gabon, Namibia, Zambia, and Zimbabwe.
	Turati's boubou	Laniarius turatii	Guinea, Guinea-Bissau, and Sierra Leone
	Yellow-crowned gonolek	Laniarius barbarus	Senegal and Democratic Republic of Congo east to Ethiopia.
	Papyrus gonolek	Laniarius mufumbiri	Burundi, Democratic Republic of the Congo, Kenya, Rwanda, Tanzania, and Uganda
	Black-headed gonolek	Laniarius erythrogaster	Burundi, Cameroon, Central African Republic, Chad, Democratic Republic of the Congo, Eritrea, Ethiopia, Kenya, Nigeria, Rwanda, Sudan, Tanzania, and Uganda.
	Crimson-breasted shrike	Laniarius atrococcineus	southern Angola to the Free State province in South Africa.
	Yellow-breasted boubou	Laniarius atroflavus	Western High Plateau

Formerly, some authorities also considered the following species (or subspecies) as species within the genus Laniarius:

- Rufous whistler (as Laniarius rubrigaster)
