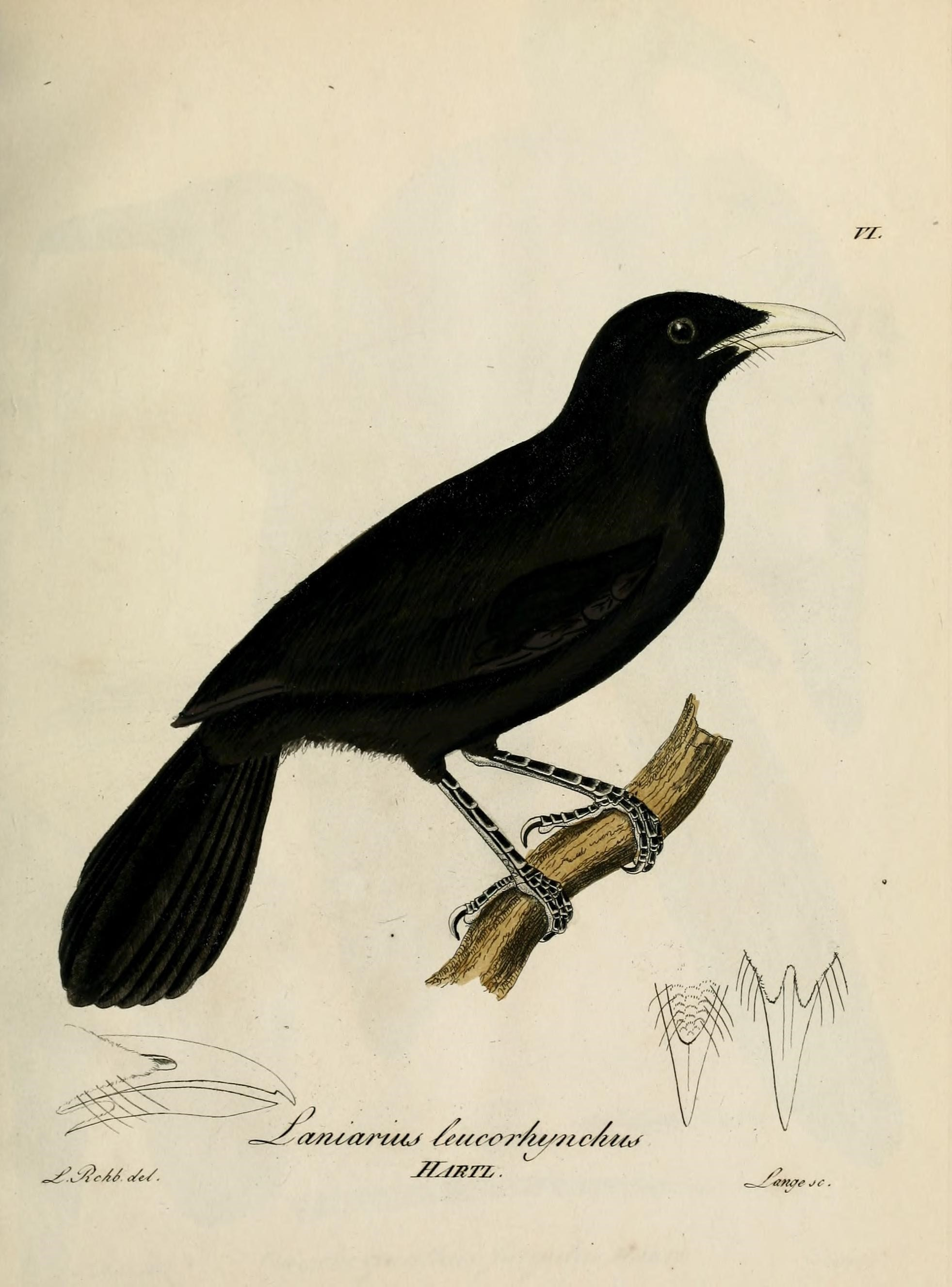

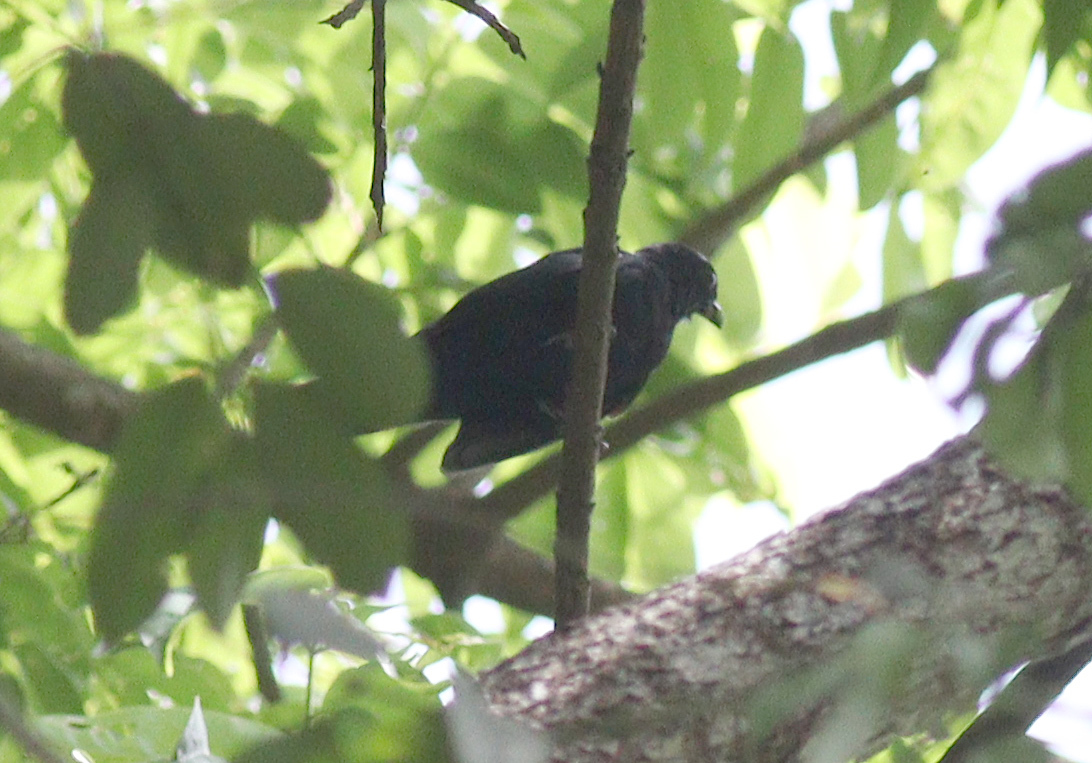

Conservation status
- Least Concern (IUCN 3.1)

Scientific classification
- Kingdom: Animalia
- Phylum: Chordata
- Class: Aves
- Order: Passeriformes
- Family: Malaconotidae
- Genus: Laniarius
- Species: L. leucorhynchus

Binomial name
- Laniarius leucorhynchus (Hartlaub, 1848)

= Lowland sooty boubou =

Species of bird

The lowland sooty boubou (Laniarius leucorhynchus), also known as the sooty boubou, is a species of bird in the family Malaconotidae. It is native to the African tropical rainforest. Its natural habitats are subtropical or tropical moist lowland forest and subtropical or tropical moist shrubland.
