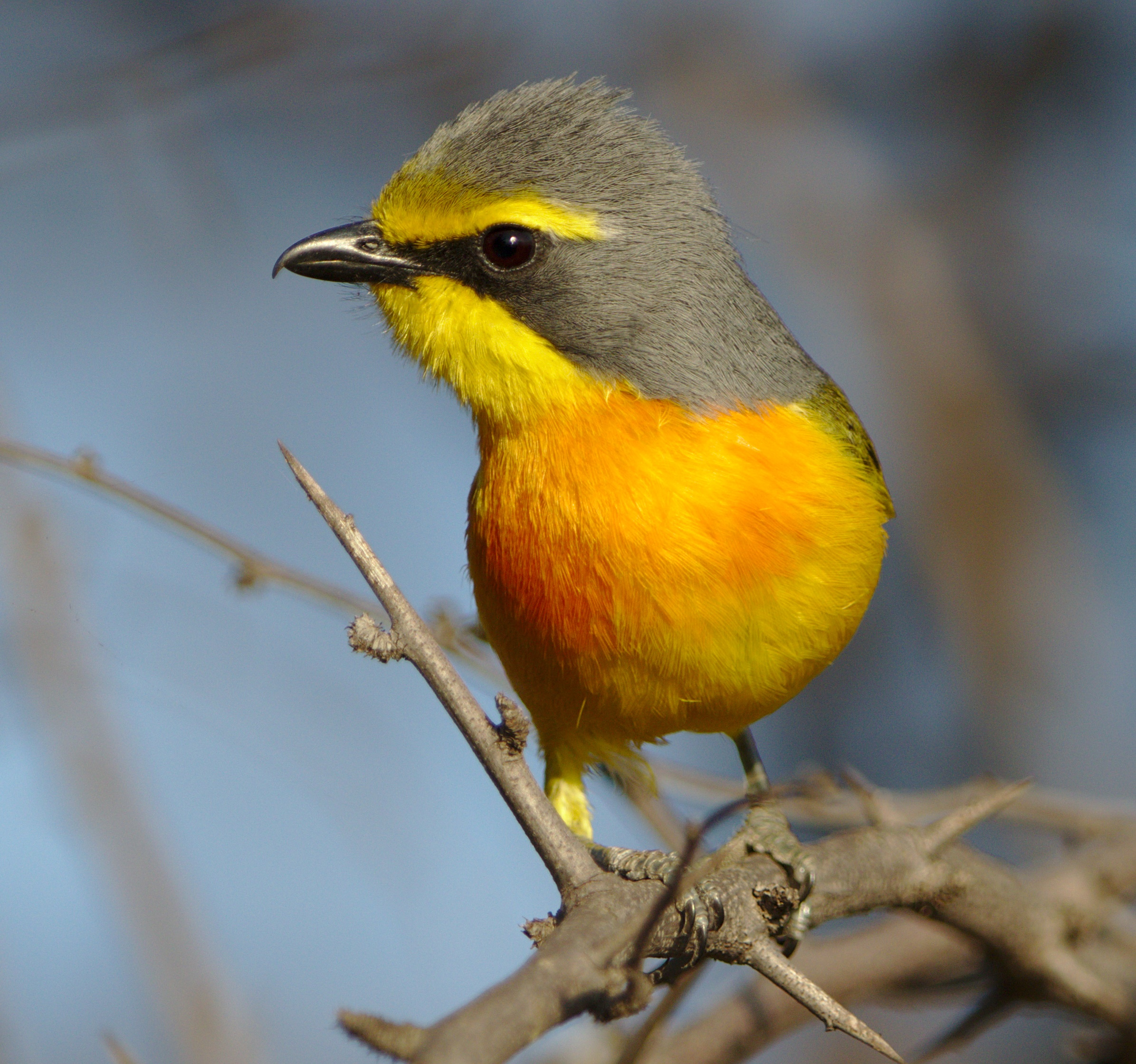
- Adult bird at Rust De Winter Nature Reserve, Limpopo

Conservation status
- Least Concern (IUCN 3.1)

Scientific classification
- Kingdom: Animalia
- Phylum: Chordata
- Class: Aves
- Order: Passeriformes
- Family: Malaconotidae
- Genus: Chlorophoneus
- Species: C. sulfureopectus

Binomial name
- Chlorophoneus sulfureopectus (Lesson, 1831)

Synonyms
- Telophorus sulfureopectus Malaconotus sulfureopectus

= Orange-breasted bushshrike =

Species of bird

The orange-breasted bushshrike or sulphur-breasted bushshrike (Chlorophoneus sulfureopectus) is a species of bird in the family Malaconotidae. Another bird, Braun's bushshrike, is also sometimes called the orange-breasted bushshrike.

== Distribution and habitat ==
The orange-breasted bushshrike is widespread throughout Sub-Saharan Africa (relatively absent from most of Central, Southern and the Horn of Africa). Its natural habitats are subtropical or tropical dry forests, dry savanna and moist savanna. It is not a migrant species.

== Behaviour ==
The bushshrike eats mainly insects, such as beetles, caterpillars, bees, ants, and wasps.

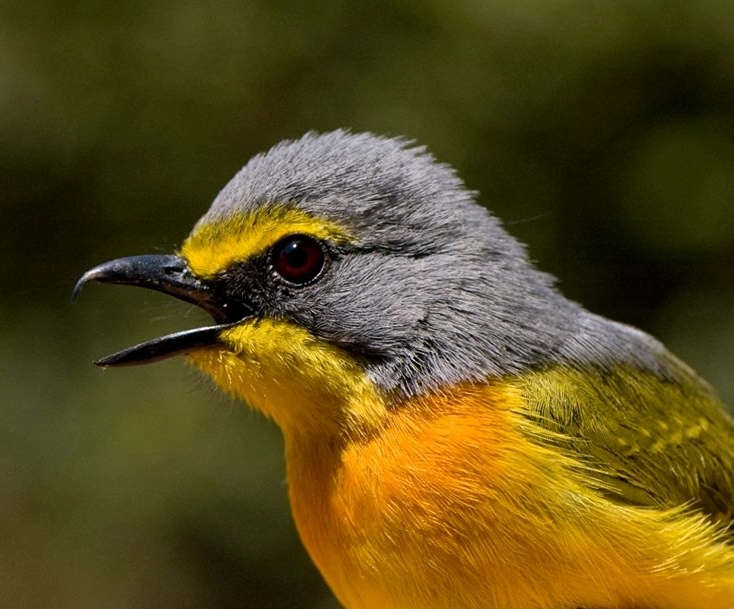
At Polokwane Game Reserve, Limpopo

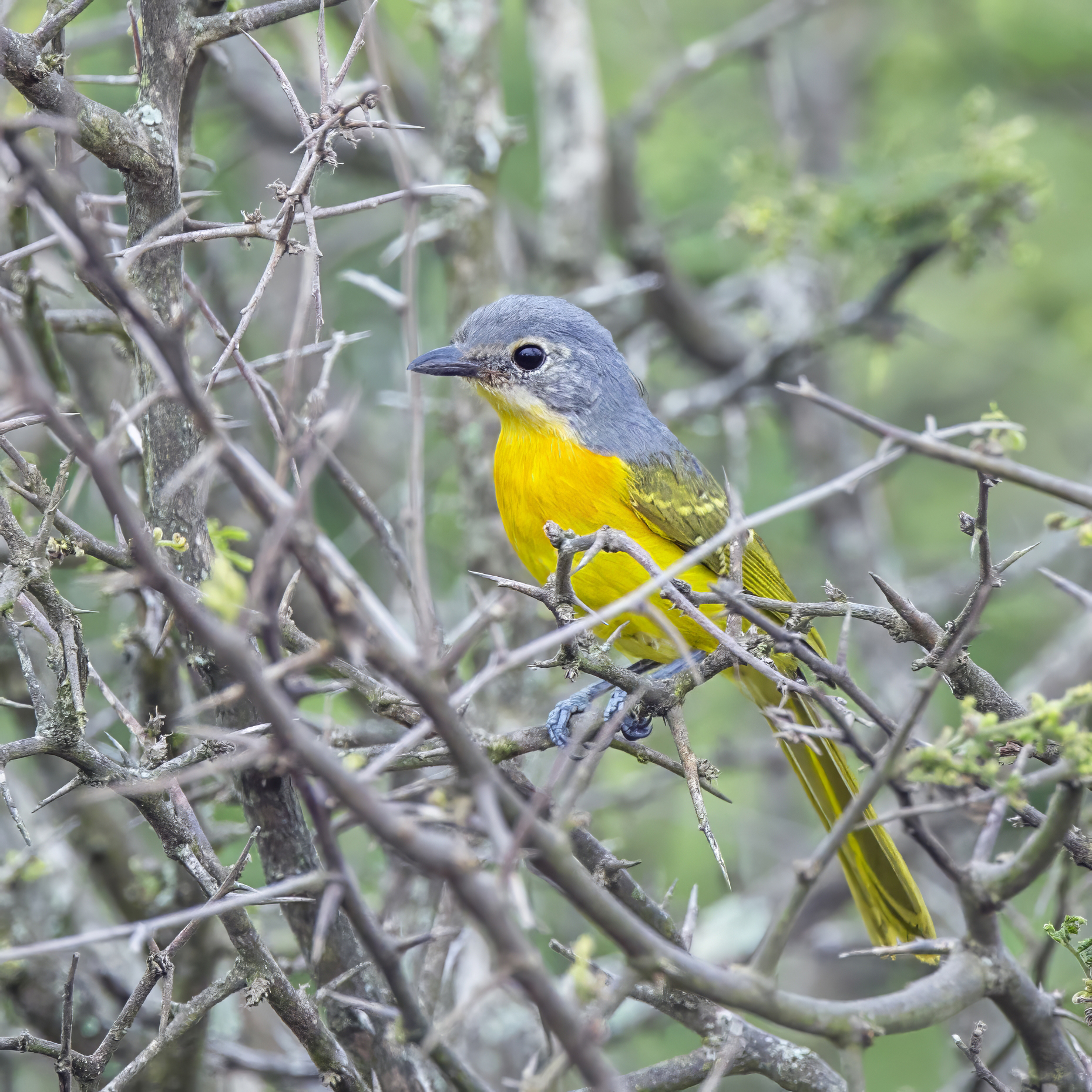
Juvenile T. s. similis at Kruger National Park

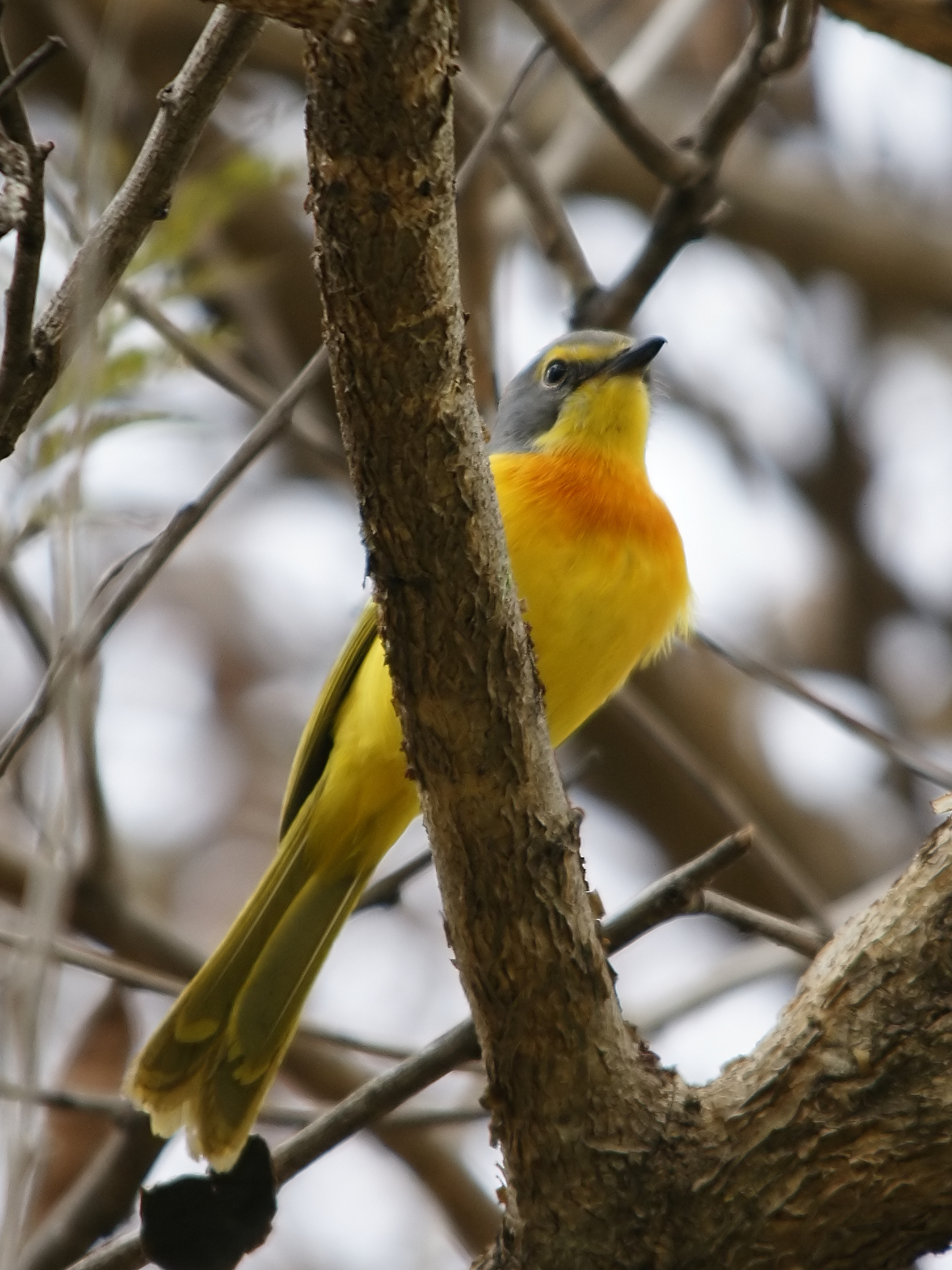
Adult bird in Zambia
