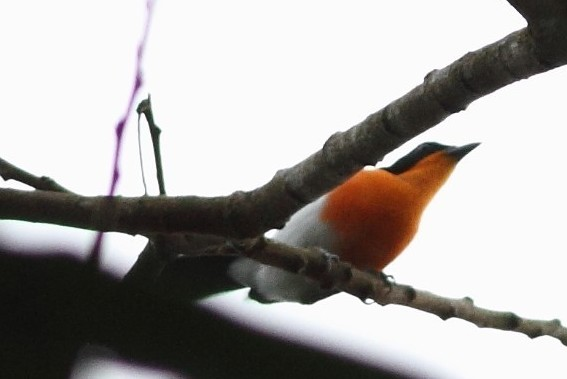

Conservation status
- Endangered (IUCN 3.1)

Scientific classification
- Kingdom: Animalia
- Phylum: Chordata
- Class: Aves
- Order: Passeriformes
- Family: Malaconotidae
- Genus: Laniarius
- Species: L. brauni

Binomial name
- Laniarius brauni Bannerman, 1939

= Braun's bushshrike =

Species of bird

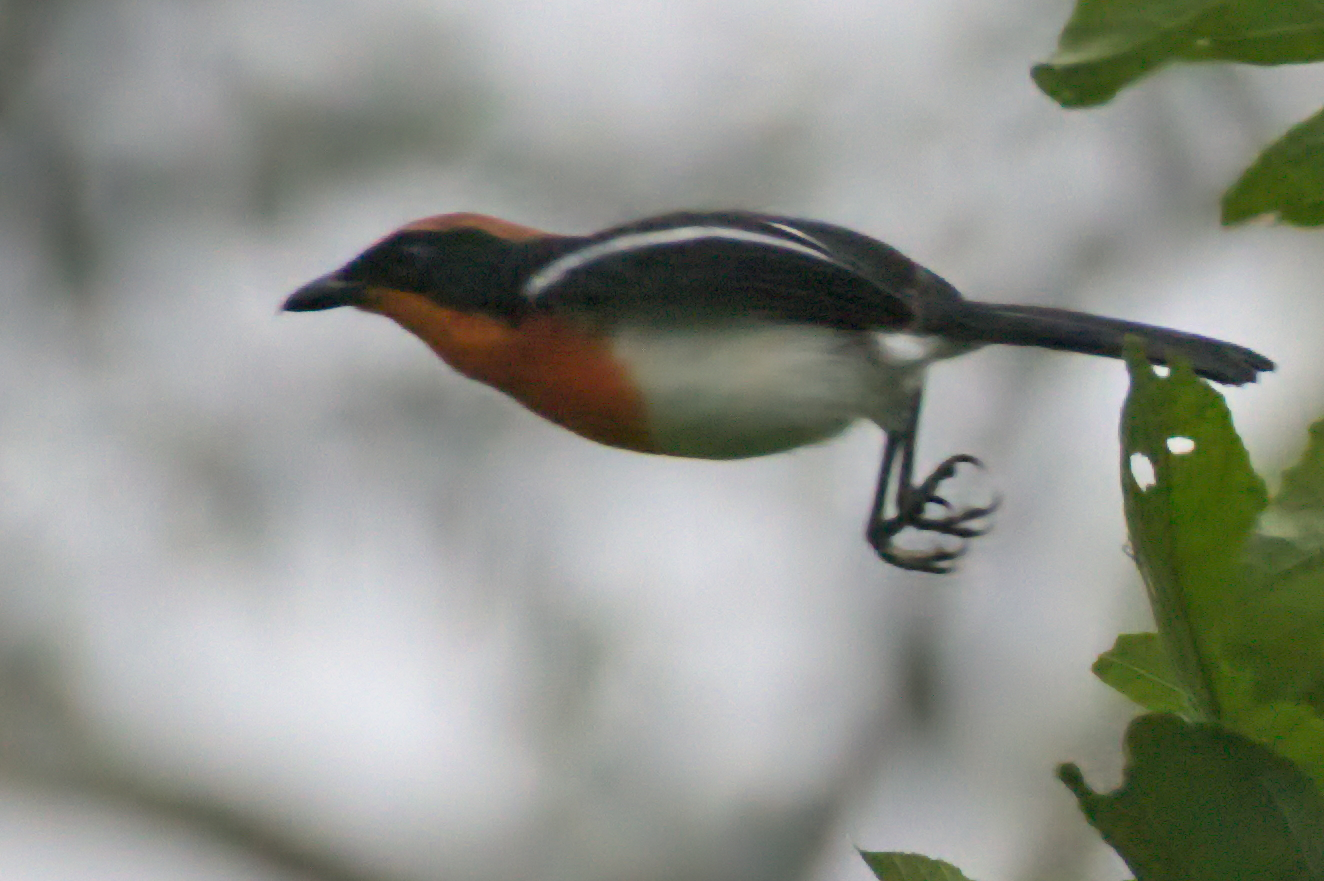
Braun's Bushshrike

Braun's bushshrike (Laniarius brauni) is a species of bird in the family Malaconotidae. It is endemic to Angola. An alternative name for this bird is the orange-breasted bushshrike, but the English name is also used for Chlorophoneus sulfureopectus.

Its natural habitat is subtropical or tropical moist lowland forests. It is threatened by habitat loss.

The common name and Latin binomial commemorate the German collector R. H. Braun who collected in southern Africa.
