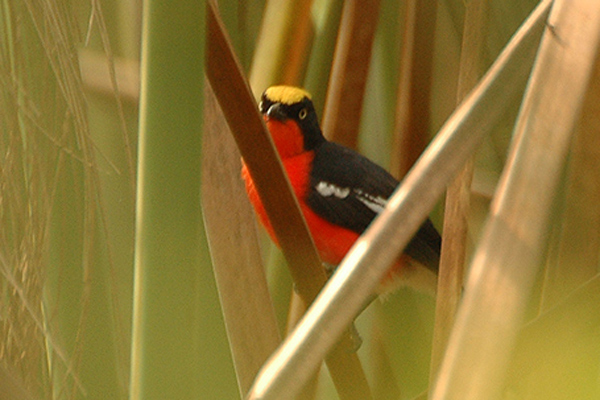

Conservation status
- Near Threatened (IUCN 3.1)

Scientific classification
- Kingdom: Animalia
- Phylum: Chordata
- Class: Aves
- Order: Passeriformes
- Family: Malaconotidae
- Genus: Laniarius
- Species: L. mufumbiri

Binomial name
- Laniarius mufumbiri Ogilvie-Grant, 1911

= Papyrus gonolek =

Species of bird

The papyrus gonolek (Laniarius mufumbiri) is a species of bird in the family Malaconotidae. It is found in Burundi, Democratic Republic of the Congo, Kenya, Rwanda, Tanzania, and Uganda. It has specialised habitat requirements, being restricted to papyrus swamps. Not yet a threatened species, it has become rare due to habitat loss and pollution.

== Description ==
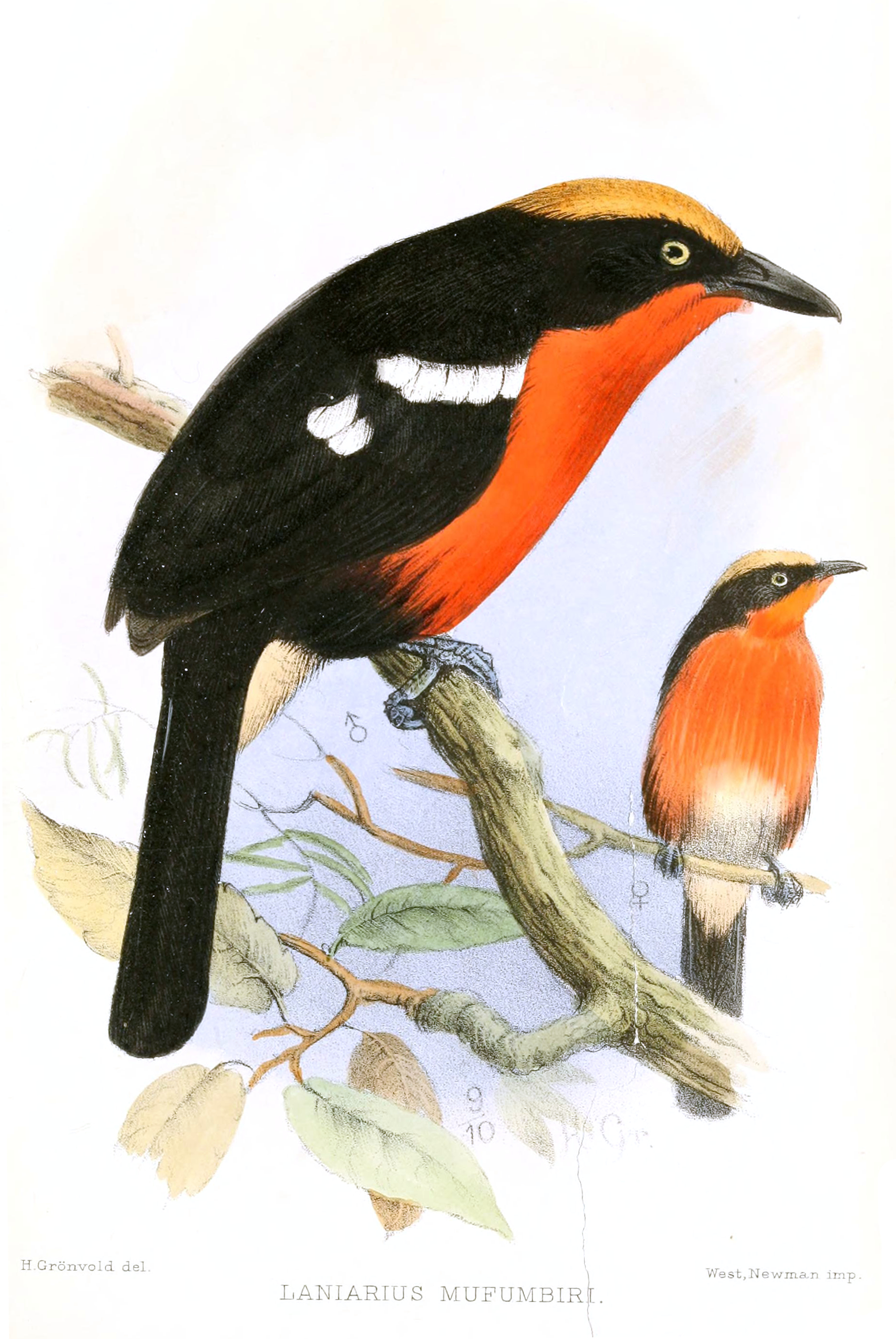

The papyrus gonolek is a medium-sized bush-shrike some 18 cm (7 in) long. The sexes are similar; the crown is dull yellow, the head, upper parts, wings and tail are black apart from a broad white bar on the wings. The breast and upper belly are vivid orange-crimson, and the lower belly whitish.

== Ecology ==
This species is difficult to observe and has been little studied. It occurs singly or in pairs in papyrus swamps, lurking among the vegetation and only flying occasionally, usually a short distance over water to another patch of papyrus. Its presence can often be detected by its calls, which consist of brief whistles and grating tearing sounds which have been rendered as "U-tzeu-U-tzee". Sometimes two birds duet. The diet consists mainly of insects such as beetles, flies and ants, but also includes snails, fruit and seeds when available. Little is known of its breeding biology, but the nest is probably built in a small bush in reedbeds.

== Status ==
The papyrus gonolek has specialist habitat requirements, being restricted to swampy areas in river systems and around lake shores. It is vulnerable to such threats as drainage of wetlands, burning and pollution caused by run-off from agricultural land. It is, however, a common species and it has been estimated that there may be two million adult birds. On this basis, the International Union for Conservation of Nature has rated its conservation status as being "near threatened".
