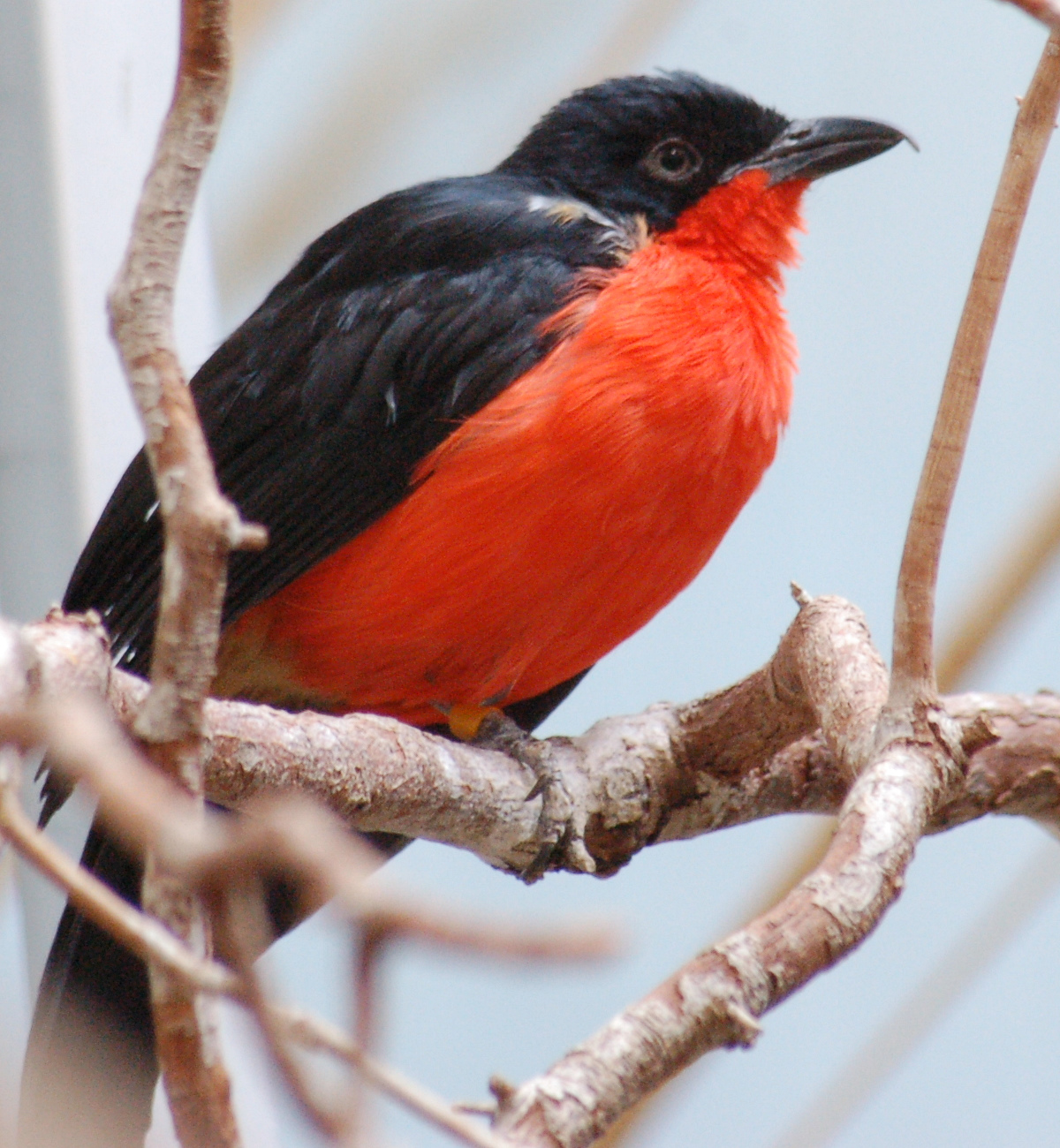

Conservation status
- Least Concern (IUCN 3.1)

Scientific classification
- Kingdom: Animalia
- Phylum: Chordata
- Class: Aves
- Order: Passeriformes
- Family: Malaconotidae
- Genus: Laniarius
- Species: L. erythrogaster

Binomial name
- Laniarius erythrogaster (Cretzschmar, 1829)

Audio
- Black-headed gonolek duet, recorded in Kongelai, Kenya

= Black-headed gonolek =

Species of bird

The black-headed gonolek (Laniarius erythrogaster) is a species of bird in the family Malaconotidae. It is found in the African countries of Burundi, Cameroon, Central African Republic, Chad, Democratic Republic of the Congo, Eritrea, Ethiopia, Kenya, Nigeria, Rwanda, South Sudan, Sudan, Tanzania, and Uganda.

Its natural habitats are dry savanna, subtropical or tropical moist shrubland, and subtropical or tropical seasonally wet or flooded lowland grassland.

The black-headed gonolek is a distinctively coloured bush-shrike though it is generally shy and retiring. However, close to human habitation and in gardens, it often becomes much bolder. It has a very distinctive call which it makes in concert with its partner. The male makes a loud, clear, bell-like sound to which the female responds almost simultaneously with a harsh grating response.
