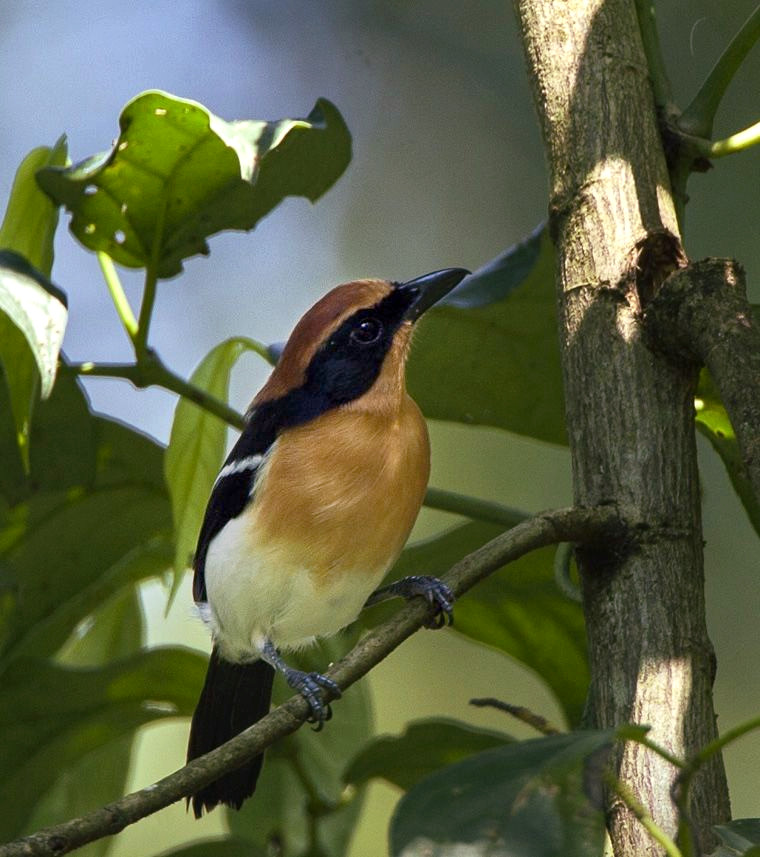

Conservation status
- Least Concern (IUCN 3.1)

Scientific classification
- Kingdom: Animalia
- Phylum: Chordata
- Class: Aves
- Order: Passeriformes
- Family: Malaconotidae
- Genus: Laniarius
- Species: L. luehderi

Binomial name
- Laniarius luehderi Reichenow, 1874

= Lühder's bushshrike =

Species of bird

Lühder's bushshrike (Laniarius luehderi) is a species of bird (a shrike) in the family Malaconotidae. It is found in Angola, Burundi, Cameroon, Republic of the Congo, Democratic Republic of the Congo, Equatorial Guinea, Gabon, Kenya, Nigeria, Rwanda, South Sudan, Tanzania, and Uganda. The common name and Latin binomial commemorate the German naturalist ornithologist W. Lühder.
