= Faerie Glen Nature Reserve =

Nature reserve in Pretoria, South Africa

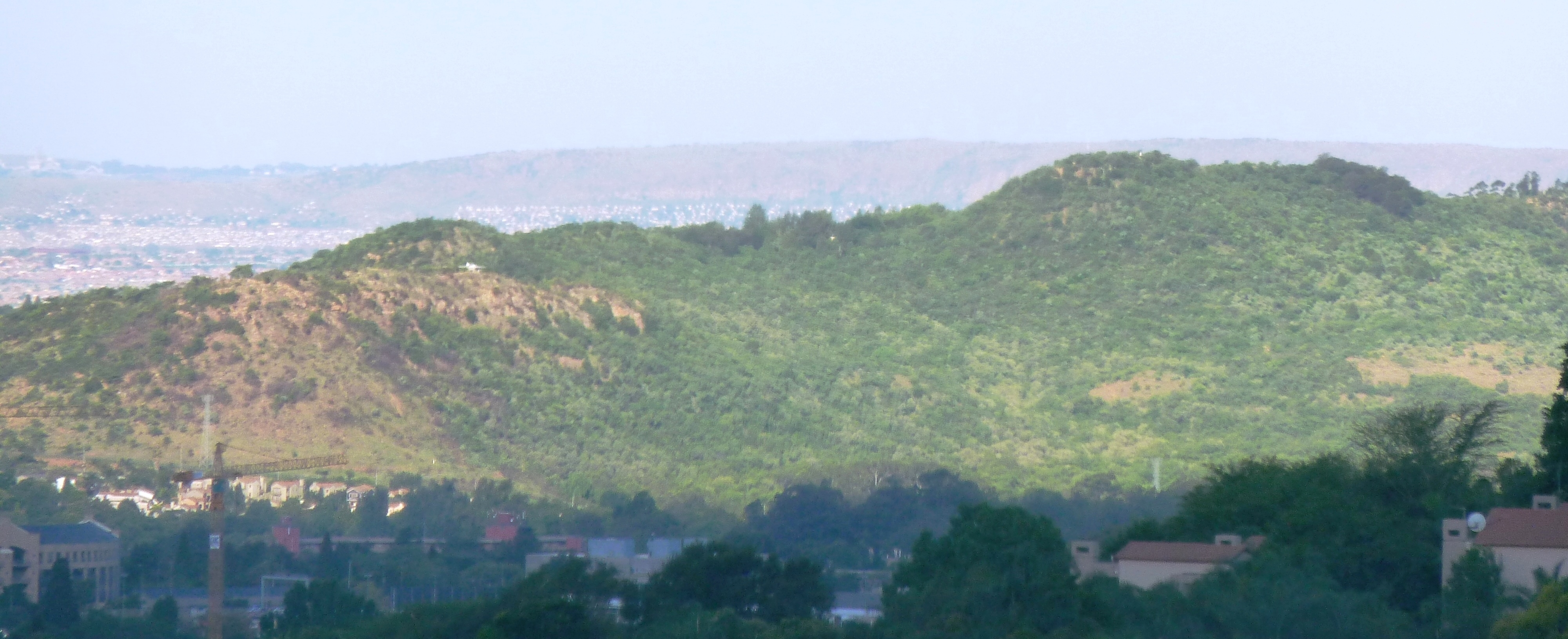
- Location on a map of Pretoria
- Location: Pretoria, Tshwane, South Africa
- Coordinates: 25.773889°S 28.298056°E
- Area: 128 ha
- Established: 1980
- Governing body: Tshwane
- Website: Faerie Glen NR, City of Tshwane
- Faerie Glen Nature Reserve (Gauteng)

Faerie Glen Nature Reserve is a nature reserve at the western limit of the Bronberg in the east of Pretoria, South Africa. It is adjacent to the suburb of Faerie Glen.

== History ==
It formerly formed a part of the farm Hartbeespoort 304 which belonged to H. W. Struben. On old aerial photographs it is apparent that the flood plain was utilised for crop fields, while the remainder was used for cattle grazing. The reserve constitutes the western part of the Bronberg conservation area, which was declared in 1980. Its highest point is Renosterkop (1,468 m) in the northern part of the reserve.

== Fauna and flora ==
=== Animal life ===
Though the smaller mammals like mongooses, hedgehogs, hares, porcupines, Cape clawless otters, bushbabies and small-spotted genets are difficult to observe, one may find signs of their presence. In the winter of 2014 larger game was introduced, namely 16 impala, 9 red hartebeest and 5 Burchell's zebra. During late 2014 one common duiker was released in the reserve, the first spotted eagle-owl house was installed, and a first sighting of caracal was made. The leaf-feeding thrip Liothrips tractabilis, introduced from Argentina, was released in the reserve's flood plain in 2014 to combat the invasive pompom weed.

=== Birds ===
Some 150 bird species have been recorded in the reserve. In terms of breeding habitat the grassy floodplain along the Moreleta spruit is especially important for a number of cisticola and widow species, and the riparian vegetation provides breeding habitat for a number of weaver species. The bushy slopes provide foraging habitat for boubous, tchagras and cuckooshrikes, while nightjars emerge at dusk to forage over the slopes and floodplain.

Bird species of Faerie Glen Nature Reserve
Common name	Scientific name	Status	Breeding
Reed cormorant	Phalacrocorax africanus	rare	
White-breasted cormorant	Phalacrocorax lucidus	vagrant	
Black-headed heron	Ardea melanocephala	vagrant	
Yellow-billed egret	Egretta intermedia	rare	
Cattle egret	Bubulcus ibis	rare	
Hamerkop	Scopus umbretta	rare	
African sacred ibis	Threskiornis aethiopicus	vagrant	
Hadeda ibis	Bostrychia hagedash	abundant	breeder
Egyptian goose	Alopochen aegyptiacus	rare	
African black duck	Anas sparsa	rare	
Maccoa duck	Oxyura maccoa	vagrant	
Yellow-billed kite	Milvus aegyptius	rare	
Black-winged kite	Elanus caeruleus	rare	
Verreaux's eagle	Aquila verreauxii	vagrant	
Steppe buzzard	Buteo vulpinus	rare	
Black sparrowhawk	Accipiter melanoleucus	rare	
Ovambo sparrowhawk	Accipiter ovampensis	rare	
Helmeted guineafowl	Numida meleagris	regular	breeder
Swainson's spurfowl	Pternistis swainsonii	rare	
Crested francolin	Dendroperdix sephaena	rare	
Red-chested flufftail	Sarothrura rufa	vagrant	
Crowned lapwing	Vanellus coronatus	regular	
Blacksmith lapwing	Vanellus armatus	rare	
African wattled lapwing	Vanellus senegallus	rare	
Spotted thick-knee	Burhinus capensis	rare	breeder
Peregrine falcon	Falco peregrinus	vagrant	
Rameron pigeon	Columba arquatrix	regular	
Speckled pigeon	Columba guinea	regular	
Red-eyed dove	Streptopelia semitorquata	abundant	
Cape turtle-dove	Streptopelia capicola	common	
Laughing dove	Streptopelia senegalensis	abundant	breeder
Rock dove	Columba livia	uncommon	
Grey go-away-bird	Corythaixoides concolor	abundant	breeder
Red-chested cuckoo	Cuculus solitarius	uncommon	breeder
Black cuckoo	Cuculus clamosus	rare	breeder
Levaillant's cuckoo	Clamator levaillantii	vagrant	breeder
Jacobin cuckoo	Clamator jacobinus	vagrant	
Klaas's cuckoo	Chrysococcyx klaas	rare	breeder
Diderick cuckoo	Chrysococcyx caprius	regular	breeder
Burchell's coucal	Centropus burchelli	vagrant	
Spotted eagle-owl	Bubo africanus	common	
Spotted eagle-owl	Bubo africanus	common	
Eurasian nightjar	Caprimulgus europaeus	uncommon	
Fiery-necked nightjar	Caprimulgus pectoralis	uncommon	
Horus swift	Apus horus	rare	
Little swift	Apus affinis	regular	
African palm-swift	Cypsiurus parvus	common	
Speckled mousebird	Colius striatus	abundant	
Red-faced mousebird	Urocolius indicus	regular	
Pied kingfisher	Ceryle rudis	rare	
Half-collared kingfisher	Alcedo semitorquata	vagrant	
Woodland kingfisher	Halcyon senegalensis	rare	
Brown-hooded kingfisher	Halcyon albiventris	rare	
European bee-eater	Merops apiaster	regular	
Blue-cheeked bee-eater	Merops persicus	vagrant	
African hoopoe	Upupa africana	regular	
Green wood hoopoe	Phoeniculus purpureus	regular	
African grey hornbill	Tockus nasutus	rare	
Black-collared barbet	Lybius torquatus	abundant	breeder
Acacia pied barbet	Tricholaema leucomelas	uncommon	breeder
Yellow-fronted tinkerbird	Pogoniulus chrysoconus	rare	
Crested barbet	Trachyphonus vaillantii	abundant	breeder
Greater honeyguide	Indicator indicator	vagrant	
Lesser honeyguide	Indicator minor	uncommon	breeder
Brown-backed honeybird	Prodotiscus regulus	uncommon	breeder
Bennett's woodpecker	Campethera bennettii	vagrant	
Golden-tailed woodpecker	Campethera abingoni	rare	
Cardinal woodpecker	Dendropicos fuscescens	uncommon	
Red-throated wryneck	Jynx ruficollis	common	breeder
Barn swallow	Hirundo rustica	rare	
White-throated swallow	Hirundo albigularis	regular	breeder
Greater striped swallow	Hirundo cucullata	regular	
Lesser striped swallow	Hirundo abyssinica	regular	breeder
Rock martin	Hirundo fuligula	uncommon	
Brown-throated martin	Riparia paludicola	vagrant	
Black cuckooshrike	Campephaga flava	uncommon	breeder
Ashy tit	Parus cinerascens	vagrant	
Fork-tailed drongo	Dicrurus adsimilis	rare	
Black-headed oriole	Oriolus larvatus	rare	
Pied crow	Corvus albus	rare	
Grey penduline tit	Anthoscopus caroli	vagrant	
Arrow-marked babbler	Turdoides jardineii	uncommon	breeder
Dark-capped bulbul	Pycnonotus tricolor	abundant	breeder
Kurrichane thrush	Turdus libonyanus	vagrant	
Karoo thrush	Turdus smithi	uncommon	
Mocking cliff chat	Thamnolaea cinnamomeiventris	vagrant	
Anteating chat	Myrmecocichla formicivora	vagrant	
Cape robin-chat	Cossypha caffra	abundant	breeder
White-throated robin-chat	Cossypha humeralis	rare	breeder
White-browed scrub robin	Cercotrichas leucophrys	rare	
Garden warbler	Sylvia borin	rare	
Icterine warbler	Hippolais icterina	vagrant	
Willow warbler	Phylloscopus trochilus	rare	
Lesser swamp-warbler	Acrocephalus gracilirostris	regular	
Common reed warbler	Acrocephalus scirpaceus	rare	
Marsh warbler	Acrocephalus palustris	rare	
Cape grassbird	Sphenoeacus afer	common	breeder
Long-billed crombec	Sylvietta rufescens	regular	breeder
Bar-throated apalis	Apalis thoracica	uncommon	
Zitting cisticola	Cisticola juncidis	uncommon	breeder
Neddicky	Cisticola fulvicapilla	common	breeder
Wailing cisticola	Cisticola lais	vagrant	
Rattling cisticola	Cisticola chiniana	regular	breeder
Levaillant's cisticola	Cisticola tinniens	regular	breeder
Tawny-flanked prinia	Prinia subflava	abundant	breeder
Black-chested prinia	Prinia flavicans	regular	
Spotted flycatcher	Muscicapa striata	uncommon	
Chestnut-vented warbler	Sylvia subcoerulea	common	
Fiscal flycatcher	Sigelus silens	uncommon	breeder
Chinspot batis	Batis molitor	uncommon	
African paradise-flycatcher	Terpsiphone viridis	uncommon	breeder
Cape wagtail	Motacilla capensis	rare	
Striped pipit	Anthus lineiventris	vagrant	
Bushveld pipit	Anthus caffer	vagrant	
Common fiscal	Lanius collaris	abundant	
Southern boubou	Laniarius ferrugineus	abundant	breeder
Crimson-breasted shrike	Laniarius atrococcineus	rare	
Black-backed puffback	Dryoscopus cubla	rare	
Brown-crowned tchagra	Tchagra australis	regular	breeder
Black-crowned tchagra	Tchagra senegalus	uncommon	breeder
Orange-breasted bushshrike	Telophorus sulfureopectus	uncommon	
Bokmakierie	Telophorus zeylonus	regular	
Brubru	Nilaus afer	rare	
Common myna	Acridotheres tristis	regular	
Cape glossy starling	Lamprotornis nitens	regular	
Red-winged starling	Onychognathus morio	rare	
Violet-backed starling	Cinnyricinclus leucogaster	vagrant	
Malachite sunbird	Nectarinia famosa	vagrant	
Marico sunbird	Cinnyris mariquensis	rare	
White-bellied sunbird	Cinnyris talatala	common	
Amethyst sunbird	Chalcomitra amethystina	regular	
Cape white-eye	Zosterops virens	uncommon	
House sparrow	Passer domesticus	rare	
Cape sparrow	Passer melanurus	common	
Southern grey-headed sparrow	Passer diffusus	rare	
Lesser masked-weaver	Ploceus intermedius	vagrant	breeder
Village weaver	Ploceus cucullatus	uncommon	breeder
Cape weaver	Ploceus capensis	regular	breeder
Southern masked-weaver	Ploceus velatus	abundant	breeder
Thick-billed weaver	Amblyospiza albifrons	rare	breeder
Red-billed quelea	Quelea quelea	rare	breeder
Southern red bishop	Euplectes orix	common	breeder
Red-collared widowbird	Euplectes ardens	common	breeder
White-winged widowbird	Euplectes albonotatus	regular	breeder
Red-headed finch	Amadina erythrocephala	rare	
Cut-throat finch	Amadina fasciata	vagrant	breeder
Bronze mannikin	Spermestes cucullatus	regular	breeder
Jameson's firefinch	Lagonosticta rhodopareia	rare	
Green-winged pytilia	Pytilia melba	rare	
Common waxbill	Estrilda astrild	rare	
Pin-tailed whydah	Vidua macroura	rare	
Yellow-fronted canary	Crithagra mozambicus	regular	
Black-throated canary	Crithagra atrogularis	uncommon	
Streaky-headed seedeater	Crithagra gularis	regular	
Cinnamon-breasted bunting	Emberiza tahapisi	rare	

== Geography ==
=== Moreleta Spruit ===
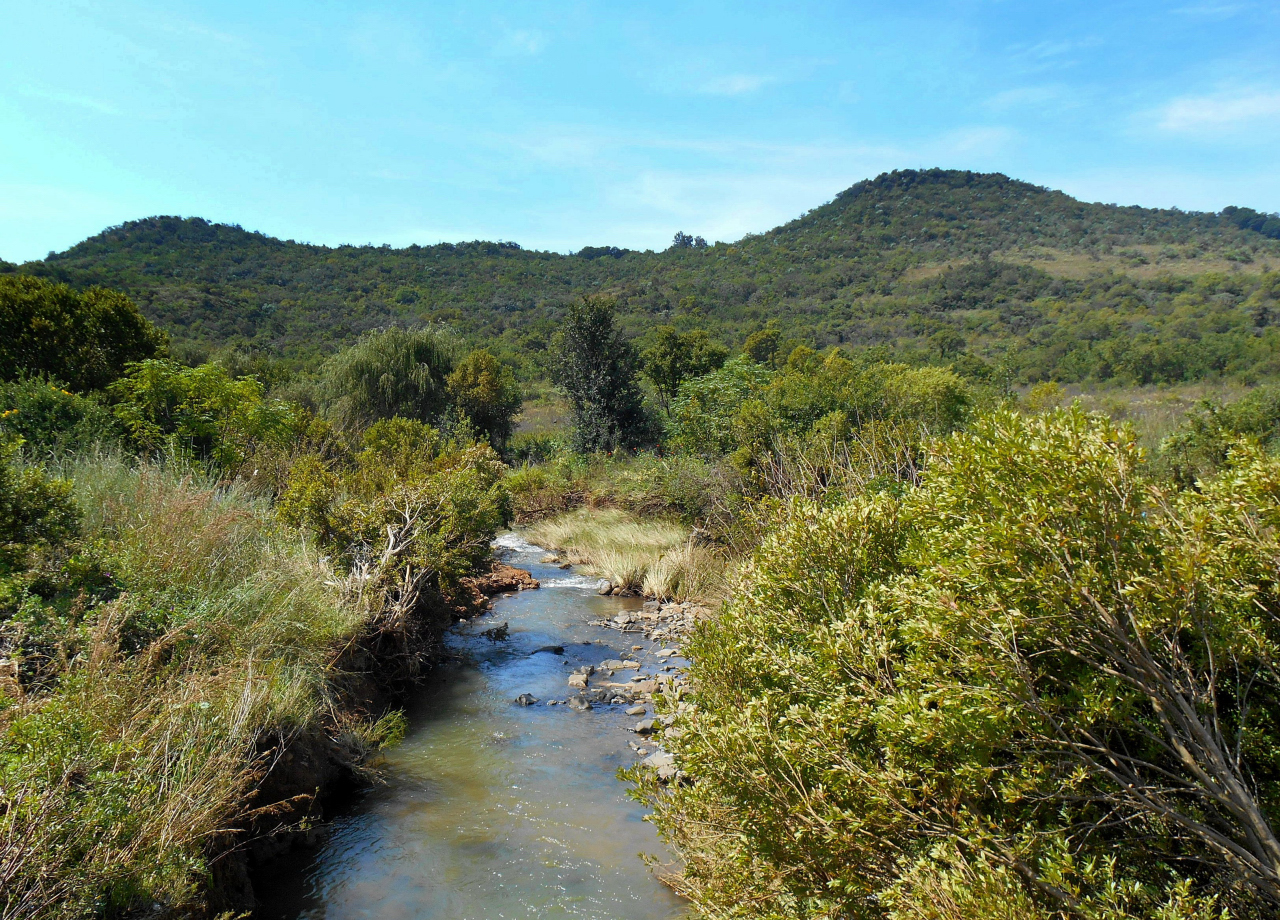
View on the Moreleta Spruit

A December 2014 assessment of the aquatic life in Moreleta Spruit indicated that it was in a critically modified state, and in poor condition with low biodiversity. The spruit now receives larger inflows than in the past, and greywater is diverted to the river from storm water systems, besides runoff from road surfaces and paved areas. The water quality has been negatively affected by oily road surfaces, lawn fertilisers, litter, constant sewage spills and illegal dumping of hazardous substances.

=== Geology ===
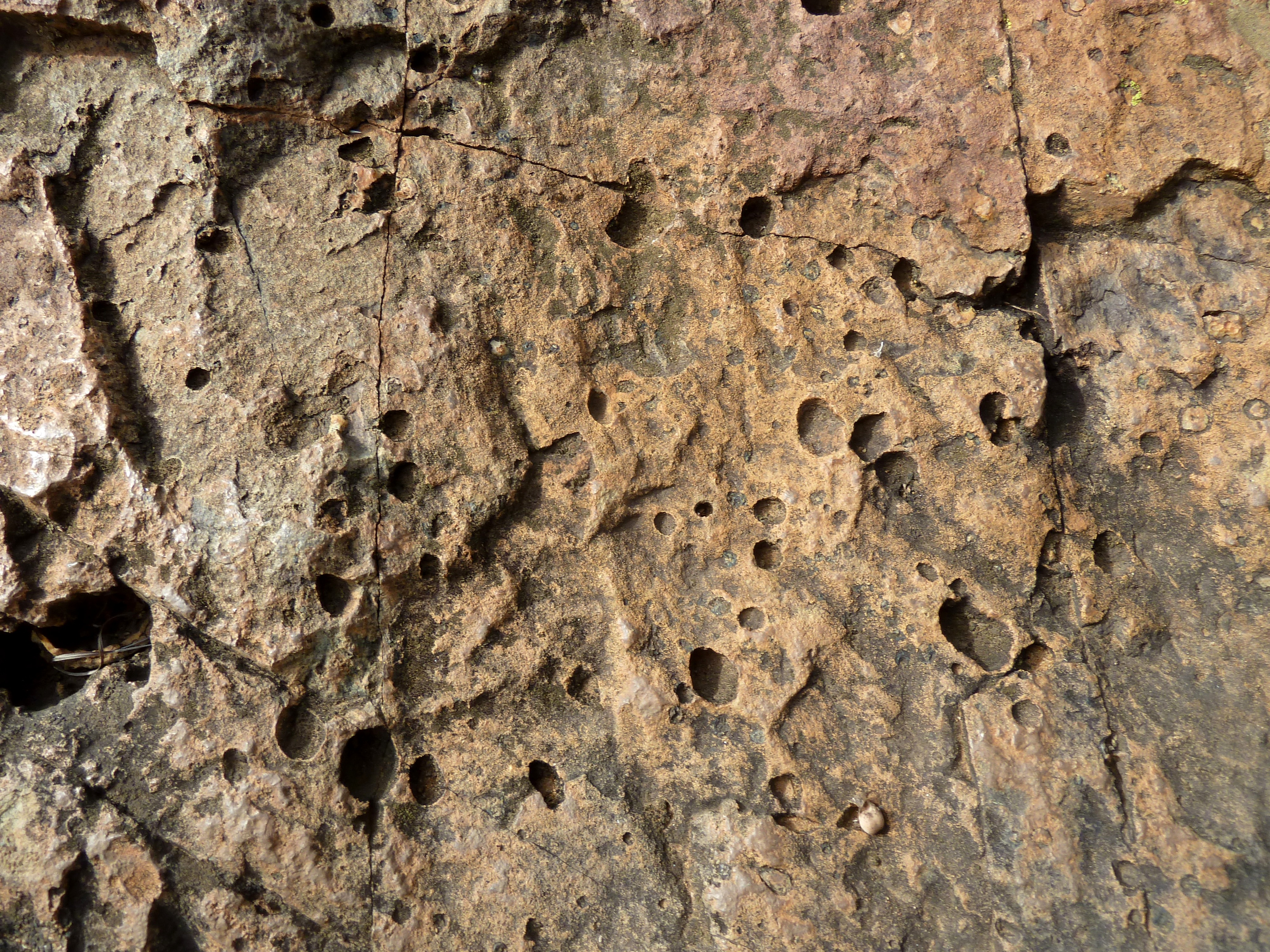
Andesitic basalt near the centre of the reserve

Andesitic basalt of the Hekpoort formation is found along the Moreleta Spruit. It was formed in the early Proterozoic, more than 2 billion years ago. Open or filled vesicles, caused by dissolved magma gasses that effervesced from the lava, are evident on the surface of these rocks. Repeated mud flows were deposited over the andesite to form mudstone, which was folded by subsequent earth shocks. An intrusive diabase formation is visible halfway up the hillside, interbedded in shale and quartzite along the Struben and Daspoort formations' contact zone. The prominent crest of the ridge consists of quartzite of the Daspoort formation. The formation is undisturbed since its formation, some 2.1 billion years ago, and traces left by water flowing over an ancient river bed are still to be seen. The quartzite layer is tilted to the north, towards a very large, ancient magma chamber to the north of the reserve.

== Recreation ==
=== Facilities and activities ===
The reserve has three trails, namely the Hadeda route of 2,3 km, the Acacia route of 3,2 km and the Kiepersol/Cussonia route of 4,2 km. Dogs are allowed only if kept on a leash, and if a dog permit is completed.

=== Admission fees and times ===
Visitors of 13 and older pay an entrance fee of R15 each, and persons 60 years and older pay R6 each. Season tickets valid for 6 months are available at R165 to R200. Visiting hours are from 06:00 to 18:00 throughout the year.

== Community ==
The Friends of the Faerie Glen Nature Reserve is an organisation that coordinates activities that promote the well-being of the reserve. They meet at regular intervals to eradicate some of the invasive plant species, or to remove litter from the reserve.

== See also ==
- Struben Dam Bird Sanctuary
