= Boggomsbaai =

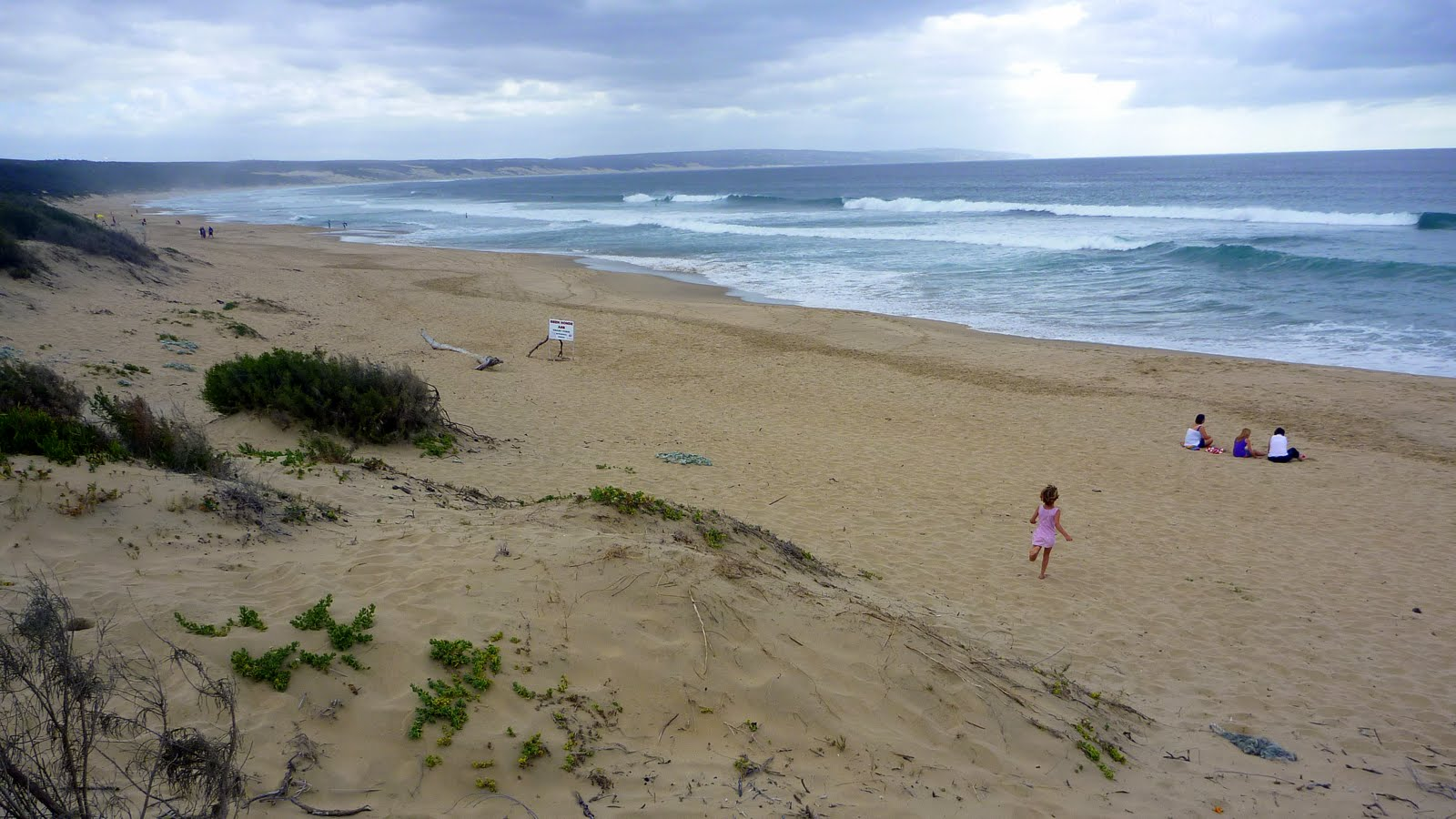
- Boggomsbai beach

- Location within Western Cape Location within South Africa
- Coordinates: 34.266°S 21.910°E
- Country: South Africa
- Province: Western Cape
- District: Garden Route
- Municipality: Mossel Bay

Area
  - Total: 1.97 km^{2} (0.76 sq mi)
- Elevation: 12 m (39 ft)

Population (2011)
  - Total: 69
  - Density: 35/km^{2} (91/sq mi)

Racial makeup (2011)
  - Black African: 2.9%
  - White: 97.1%

First languages (2011)
  - Afrikaans: 97.1%
  - English: 1.4%
  - Sign language: 1.4%
- Time zone: UTC+2 (SAST)

Boggomsbaai (or Boggoms Bay) is a coastal holiday village in Mossel Bay Municipality in the Western Cape province of South Africa.

Located between Vleesbaai and Danabaai, the village is accessed by a single road, approximately 28.8 km from Mossel Bay Municipality. Primarily a holiday destination, only a quarter of the houses are occupied on a full-time basis. Businesses in the area vary between a dozen or so bed & breakfast accommodations and a golf-club. There are no other shops in Boggomsbaai.

This small village contains two public gangways to access the beach. The bay is known for whales and dolphins, who use the bay as a feeding ground.

Boggomsbaai has a self-contained nature reserve within it, which comprises small reptiles and mammals such as tortoises, snakes, guinea fowl, hares and small antelope. It is also home to a variety of bird species, including owls and sunbirds.

== Animal life ==
=== List of mammals ===
- Cape bushbuck (Tragelaphus sylvaticus)
- Cape hare (Lepus capensis)
- Cape grey mongoose (Herpestes pulverulentus)
- Four-striped grass mouse (Rhabdomys pumilio)

=== List of reptiles ===
- Snakes
  - Boomslang (Dispholidus typus)
  - Brown house snake (Boaedon capensis)
  - Cape Cobra (Naja nivea)
  - Mole snake (Pseudaspis cana)
  - Puffadder (Bitis arietans)
- Tortoises
  - Angulate tortoise (Chersina angulata)

=== List of birds ===
- African oystercatcher (Haematopus moquini)
- African paradise flycatcher (Terpsiphone viridis)
- Burchell's coucal (Centropus burchellii burchellii)
- Cape bulbul (Pycnonotus capensis)
- Cape eagle-owl (Bubo capensis)
- Cape robin-chat (Dessonornis caffer caffer)
- Cape white-eye (Zosterops virens)
- Hartlaub's gull (Chroicocephalus hartlaubii)
- Hoopoe (Upupa epops)
- Kelp gull (Larus dominicanus vetula)
- Olive thrush (Turdus olivaceus pondoensis)
- Southern double-collared sunbird (Cinnyris chalybeus)
- Southern fiscal (Lanius collaris)
- Speckled mousebird (Colius striatus)
- White-fronted plover (Anarhynchus marginatus)
