= Greenbottle =

Greenbottle may refer to:

- Green bottle fly, applied to numerous species of Calliphoridae or blowfly
- GreenBottle, a company manufacturing cartons
- Greenbottle, a character in the Australian comedic radio series Yes, What?

== See also ==
- Soda-lime glass, used for making bottles, which are often green
- Bottle green, a shade of green
- Bluebottle (disambiguation)
