= Dana Bay =

- Location within Western Cape Location within South Africa
- Coordinates: 34°11′57″S 22°02′30″E
- Country: South Africa
- Province: Western Cape
- District: Garden Route
- Municipality: Mossel Bay

Area
  - Total: 9.66 km^{2} (3.73 sq mi)

Population (2011)
  - Total: 2,590
  - Density: 268/km^{2} (694/sq mi)

Racial makeup (2011)
  - Black African: 5.0%
  - Coloured: 3.0%
  - Indian/Asian: 0.2%
  - White: 90.7%
  - Other: 1.0%

First languages (2011)
  - Afrikaans: 79.5%
  - English: 16.4%
  - Other: 4.0%
- Time zone: UTC+2 (SAST)
- PO box: 6510

Dana Bay (Afrikaans: Danabaai) is a village in the Mossel Bay Municipality of Western Cape, South Africa. Dana Bay lies approximately halfway between Port Elizabeth and Cape Town and is 4 kilometers off the N2 highway with the central part of Mossel Bay about 12 kilometers away.

There are no hotels in Dana Bay however there are multiple bed and breakfast establishments and a new specialised medical centre.

This area is hosts a variety of free roaming animals. It is not uncommon to find bushbuck, mongoose, tortoise, porcupine, guineafowl and cape spurfowl. Grysbok can also be seen. There is a breeding pair of rock kestrels and jackal buzzards within the area, and on the cliffs not far away is a pair of peregrine falcons. A list of common birds in the area is to be found below. Snakes are a regular occurrence such as the Cape cobra and puffadder. The fire department plays an important role in capturing them and releasing them further away.

The bay frequently plays host to the Bryde's whale and from June to late October the southern right whale and humpback whale can be spotted quite often.

On a fairly regular basis, Bottlenose dolphins can be seen frolicking in the surf or a little further out in the bay. Cape gannets frequently dive into the sea and then resurface a moment later with a fish in their beak.

Dana Bay is a recognised conservancy, hosting coastal and limestone varieties of fynbos and supports one of the highest numbers of endemic species in the Cape Floristic Region. The area outside of the village is mostly surrounded by the farm Rem Droogfontein 245, which does not form part of the conservancy. However, in its natural untouched state it hosts a large proportion of free roaming animals which regularly cross in and out of the conservancy area.

The area is rich in history regarding the Khoisan people that found a home here and archeological findings date back almost 175,000 years.

Bird species to be found in the area include:

Cape gannet, white-breasted cormorant, cape cormorant, African black oystercatcher, white-fronted plover, kelp gull, sandwich tern, swift tern,

grey heron, blue crane, hadeda ibis,

Booted eagle, jackal buzzard, African harrier-hawk, peregrine falcon, rock kestrel, black-shouldered kite, black sparrowhawk dark morph, spotted eagle-owl, black Harrier,

pied crow, white-necked raven,

cape spurfowl, helmeted guineafowl,

speckled pigeon, red-eyed dove, laughing dove, cape turtle dove,

Knysna turaco, Burchell's coucal Southern Variant,

speckled mousebird, red-faced mousebird,

brown-hooded kingfisher, giant kingfisher,

African hoopoe,

barn swallow, greater striped swallow, rock martin, common house martin, brown-throated martin,

fork-tailed drongo, black cuckooshrike,

cape bulbul, sombre greenbul, terrestrial brownbul, cape rock thrush, cape robin-chat,

bar-throated apalis, cape penduline tit, tawny-flanked prinia, karoo prinia,

fiscal flycatcher, paradise flycatcher, common fiscal,

cape wagtail, southern boubou, southern tchagra, bokmakierie, common starling,

cape sugarbird, malachite sunbird, southern double-collared sunbird, greater double-collared sunbird, amethyst sunbird, orange-breasted sunbird,

cape white-eye, house sparrow, cape sparrow, streaky-headed seedeater, cape bunting, swee waxbill,

cape weaver, yellow bishop, cape canary, yellow canary, brimstone canary, white-throated canary,

cardinal woodpecker, Knysna woodpecker,

fiery-necked nightjar,

spotted thick-knee, pin-tailed whydah, hamerkop
