= Vleesbaai =

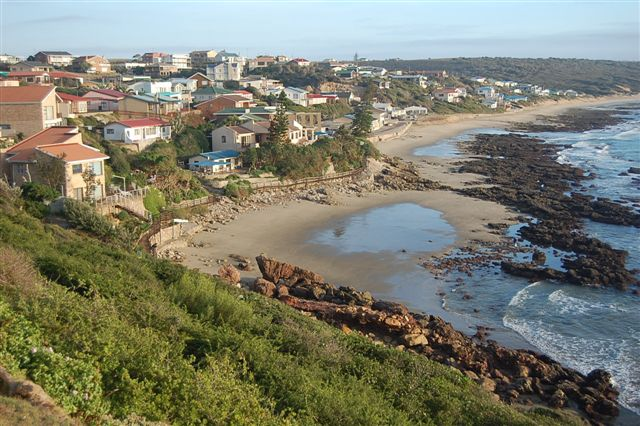
- Modern day view of the beach from Hoekbaai

- Location within Western Cape Location within South Africa Location within Africa
- Coordinates: 34.292°S 21.914°E
- Country: South Africa
- Province: Western Cape
- District: Garden Route
- Municipality: Mossel Bay

Area
  - Total: 1.05 km^{2} (0.41 sq mi)

Population (2011)
  - Total: 194
  - Density: 185/km^{2} (479/sq mi)

Racial makeup (2011)
  - Black African: 7.3%
  - Coloured: 3.6%
  - Indian/Asian: 0.5%
  - White: 88.6%

First languages (2011)
  - Afrikaans: 94.1%
  - English: 3.7%
  - Tswana: 1.1%
  - Other: 1.1%
- Time zone: UTC+2 (SAST)
- Postal code (street): 6504 (Johnson's Post)

Vleesbaai, a seaside vacation town, situated between Mossel Bay and Gouritsmond in Western Cape, South Africa.

== History ==
Vleesbaai is known today by the name it was given by European explorers. The first European to set eyes on the bay now known as Vleesbaai was Portuguese explorer Bartolomeu Dias in 1488. Dias would have come into the bay, as he discovered the southern shores of the African continent en route to the East, in the process of establishing the spice route.

It took more than a century after the Bartolomeu Dias expeditions for Vleesbaai to get this name, and the bay was christened by another explorer, the Dutchman Paulus van Caerden. It was due to bad wind conditions on 14 July 1601 that Van Caerden was forced to seek refuge in the protected bay. He was pleased to discover that many natives ashore were willing to trade their well-fed livestock for scrap metal and other fancy Western articles and goods – he named it Vleys Baeye, the Old Dutch word for Vleesbaai, directly translated into English as “Bay of meat”. Van Caerden was also the man responsible for naming the neighbouring settlements in the vicinity, including Visbaai (Afrikaans, meaning 'Fish Bay') to the west, and Mosselbaai (Afrikaans, meaning 'Mussel Bay'), known as Mossel Bay in South African English, approximately 30 km to the east of Vleesbaai.

For many years there was confusion as to which of the two neighbouring bays – Vleesbaai en Visbaai – were which. This was largely because the names of the bays were swapped around and displayed incorrectly on maps for many years. However, it was officially corrected in 1972 by the Surveyor-General’s Trigonometry Surveys and Mapping Office.

Vleesbaai and its surrounding region proved to be good agricultural land for livestock, and as result it saw an increase of nomadic farmers from the Cape region creating farm settlements in the area during the greater part of the nineteenth century. It was only towards the first part of the twentieth century that the first informal settlements started in the bay as a holiday camping site for the local farmers.

== Modern day ==
Vleesbaai is a seaside vacation town made up of approximately 500 plots of varying sizes and controlled by three companies and three homeowners associations.

The houses in Vleesbaai are largely owned by geographically diverse South Africans, who use these houses as holliday accommodation, although there are a number of permanent residents, mainly retirees who have made their holiday homes their permanent homes. As a result, Vleesbaai’s occupancy fluctuates, with the holiday seasons being particularly busy. The Christmas period, the traditional South African summer holiday, and Easter is in general the time when Vleesbaai enjoys its highest occupancy levels.

Despite larger numbers, Vleesbaai remains relatively uncrowded when compared to other holiday towns in the region – this is largely due to the private nature of home ownership, and therefore limited numbers of visitors and guests even during the busy periods.

The local shop is the only business plot in Vleesbaai, where one can find all the essential groceries and fuel. Due to the small shop size the variety of goods sold is limited, and for larger shopping trips, residents need to make the short journey to nearby Mossel Bay or Gouritzmond. Furthermore, the local shop does not have a liquor license, thus no liquor is sold in Vleesbaai.

Across the road from the shop is the church hall, where sermons are conducted on Sundays and on Christmas, as well as fairs and numerous other community events during the peak seasons. Vleesbaai is fenced off and access is controlled by a guarded entrance gate. Motor vehicle parking inside the town is very limited and non-resident visitors and other traffic volumes are monitored by the staff at the entrance gate. Access to the shop and the church hall is open to the public and pedestrian visitors are welcome to access the beach via the main gate.

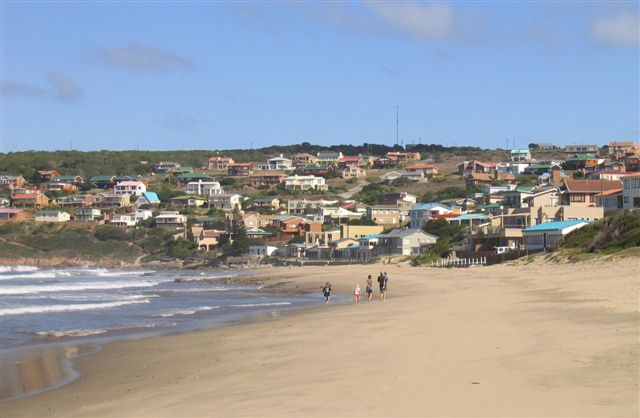
Modern day view of Vleesbaai beach from Boggomsbaai.

The dirt road network between the plots has been replaced with tarred roads in recent years, and numerous speed bumps introduced to control the motorist’s speed within the town. Residents and visitors alike on the whole adhere to the speed limit of 20 km/h, as the town’s streets are filled with pedestrian traffic, in particular children that play in and around the houses.

Prior to receiving electricity in 1986, most of the houses used propane gas, lamp oil and candle light as a means of lighting and heating their homes. And although gas hobs and ovens were the main method for cooking indoors, the preferred method for cooking is by means of open fires or braais (Afrikaans, meaning barbecue). Water inside the houses was in most cases heated by means of wall mounted gas units, prior to the availability of electricity. In some of the older houses in Vleesbaai, one can still come across redundant copper pipes that fed the various gas appliances. Many houses in Vleesbaai today operate on a combination of both electricity and liquified gas cylinders.

The rest of the service infrastructure like water, sewerage and storm water reticulation is well established and continuously maintained by "Vleesbaai Dienste". All the houses in Vleesbaai have access to pressurised municipal water and with the development of Hoekbaai extension in 1991, a sewerage treatment works facility was provided and eventually all the houses were connected to this sewerage system. Storm water reticulation was also recently upgraded, along with the local road network.

== Getting there ==
Vleesbaai can be accessed by tarred road by turning off the N2 national highway onto R325 route, or alternatively there are a couple of dirt roads that offer a more direct route to Vleesbaai from the N2. Although the dirt roads are shorter in distance, the tarred roads offer more comfort.

The nearest large town is Mossel Bay towards the east, a 34 km drive to the town centre from Vleesbaai via the R325 and N2, eastbound. The nearest commercial airport is 68 km away at George International Airport, which is also situated towards the east of Vleesbaai.

== Attractions ==
=== Swimming & other watersport ===
The southern side of the bay of Vleesbaai is protected by the Fransmanshoek peninsula which shelters Vleesbaai from the open ocean currents. This makes for favourable swimming conditions, although there are light rip currents which bathers should be aware of, and when on-shore winds prevail, there can be an increase of blue bottles and jellyfish.

During the holiday season the beach at Vleesbaai is a hub of activity. Water sports like surfing, kayaking and kite surfing all take place, but within designated swim areas to keep swimmers safe. Among the local surfing community there is a place called “TOADS” the rocky shores of the Fransmanshoek peninsula that provides a right-hand break for surfers when conditions are right. TOADS is an acronym for Take Off And Die Syndrome and was christened in July 1984 by Mark Blewett, Jamii Hamlin and Shane Immelman. Mark's father owned the Karmosyn Caravan Park during the mid eighties.

=== Walking and hiking ===
Vleesbaai is known for its sandy beaches.

Hikers that participate in the Oystercatcher Hiking Trail from Pinnacle Point near Mossel Bay to Gouritzmond will pass through Vleesbaai on day 4 of the trail.

In Unforgettable Walks to Take Before You Die, the book in which authors Steve Watkins and Clare James rate walks worldwide, the Oystercatcher Route is one of only two South African Trails mentioned (the other is Cape Nature’s Tierkloof Trail).

=== Marine life and wildlife ===
Many marine animals frequent the bay, including schools of dolphins. In September and October, Southern Right whales and their calves take shelter there.

Walking along the shore one might come across the Oystercatcher birds, with their distinctive red beaks. They actually do not eat oysters but eat mussels. The oystercatcher is quite a shy bird and comes out only when the beaches are clear. Oystercatchers are monogamous and will never take another partner. They live until 30 or 40 years so if a bird loses his partner, he will spend the rest of years as a lonely widower and vice versa.

Wild oysters are still to be found on the rocks exposed during low tide. However, over-harvesting by humans has left the number available quite depleted.

Motorists traveling in and around Vleesbaai must take heed of tortoises and small buck that can often be found crossing the road.

=== Off-roading ===
The Vleesbaai sand dunes are a common 4x4 route, taking participants over sand dunes between Vleesbaai and Kanon (Cape Vacca). This 12 km dune route has a medium difficulty grading and provides enjoyment for drivers of varying skill levels.

=== Fishing ===
Fishing is also a common pastime in Vleesbaai and the beach in the bay provides the shore fisherman with multiple fishing spots. Bait and angling equipment and accessories are sold in the local shop. The low tide also exposes “red bait” that can be harvested from the rocks. Permits can be obtained at any post office, the closest of which is at Johnson’s Post, approximately 7.3 km westbound on the way to Gouritzmond.
