= Lynnwood Glen =

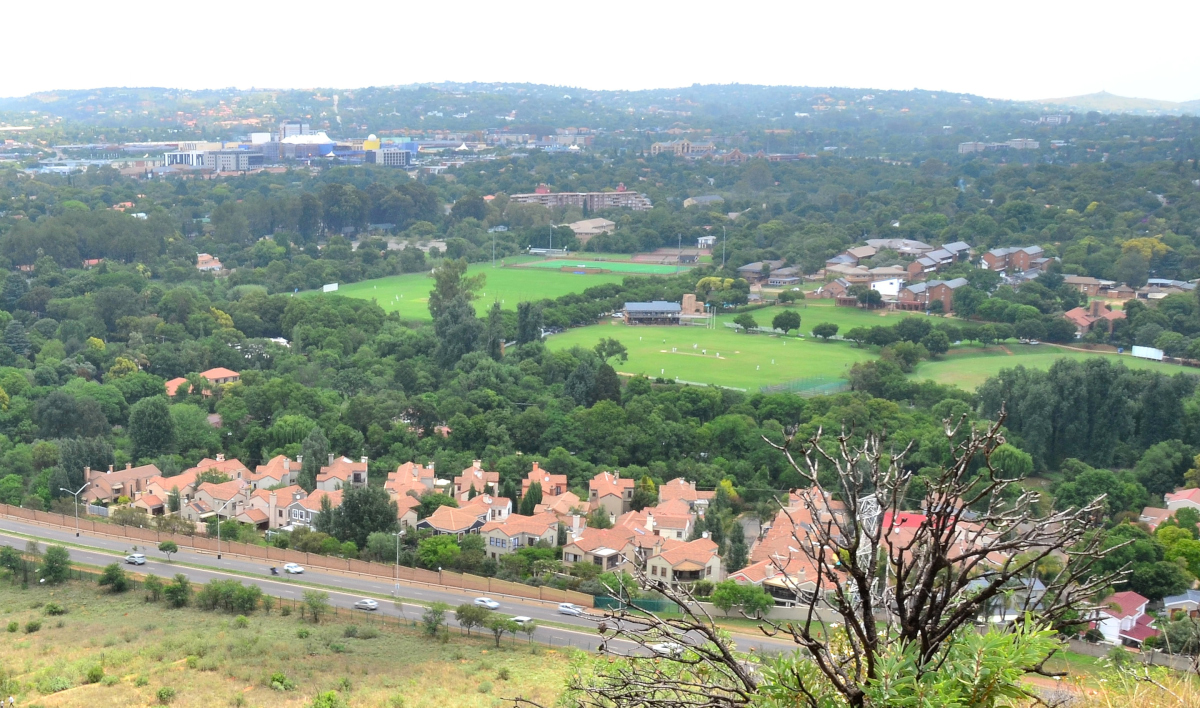
- View of Lynnwood Glen

- Location within Gauteng Location within South Africa Location within Africa
- Coordinates: 25°46′26″S 28°16′54″E
- Country: South Africa
- Province: Gauteng
- Municipality: City of Tshwane
- Main Place: Pretoria

Area
  - Total: 2.78 km^{2} (1.07 sq mi)

Population (2011)
  - Total: 4,123
  - Density: 1,480/km^{2} (3,840/sq mi)

Racial makeup (2011)
  - Black African: 20.7%
  - Coloured: 1.3%
  - Indian/Asian: 2.2%
  - White: 73.0%
  - Other: 2.8%

First languages (2011)
  - Afrikaans: 50.2%
  - English: 31.7%
  - Zulu Sotho: 2.1%
  - Tswana: 2.7%
  - Other: 13.4%
- Time zone: UTC+2 (SAST)
- Postal code (street): 0081

Lynnwood Glen is a suburb of the city of Pretoria, South Africa. It is a well-developed area, lying to the east of the city centre.

When it was first established in 1967, it was the most eastern suburb of Pretoria, but the city has since considerably expanded eastwards and southwards.

Together with Brooklyn and Menlo Park, it was most likely named after American counterparts. Today, these suburbs are known as the old east and have some of the city's most valuable residential properties. St. Alban's College, a prestige boarding and day school for boys, is located in the centre of the suburb.

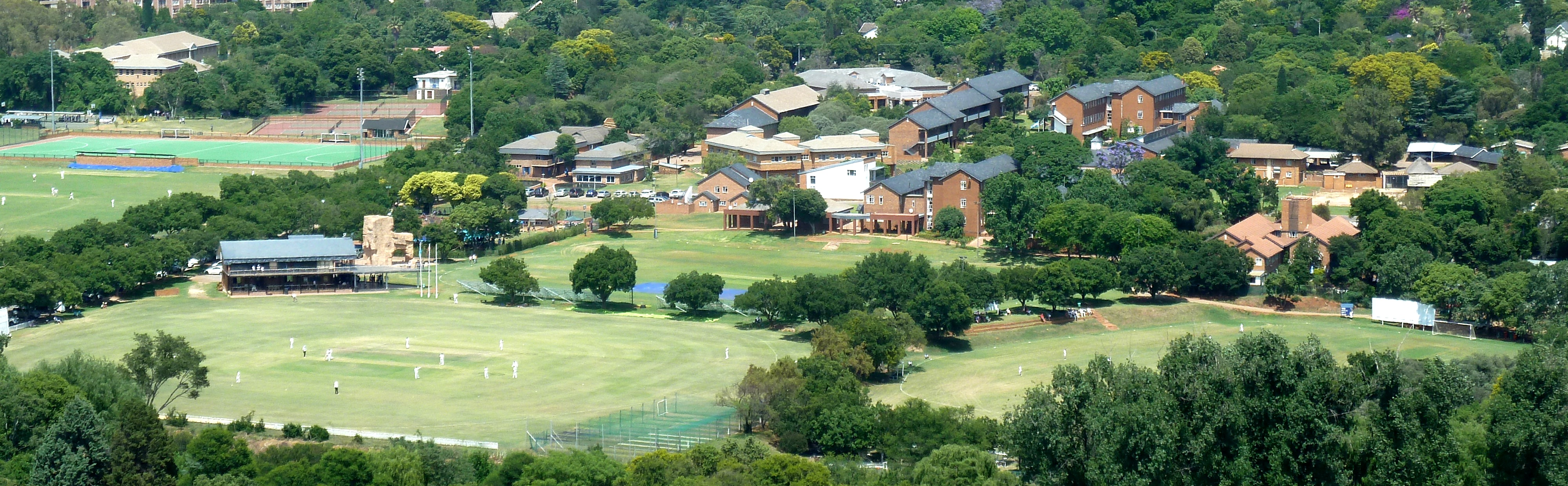
St. Alban's College situated in Lynnwood Glen with its cricket fields in the foreground. This private boys' school was founded in 1963 with 37 learners and 3 masters ― by 2019 it boasted some 590 learners and 60 teachers.

== See also ==
- Faerie Glen Nature Reserve
- Struben Dam Bird Sanctuary
