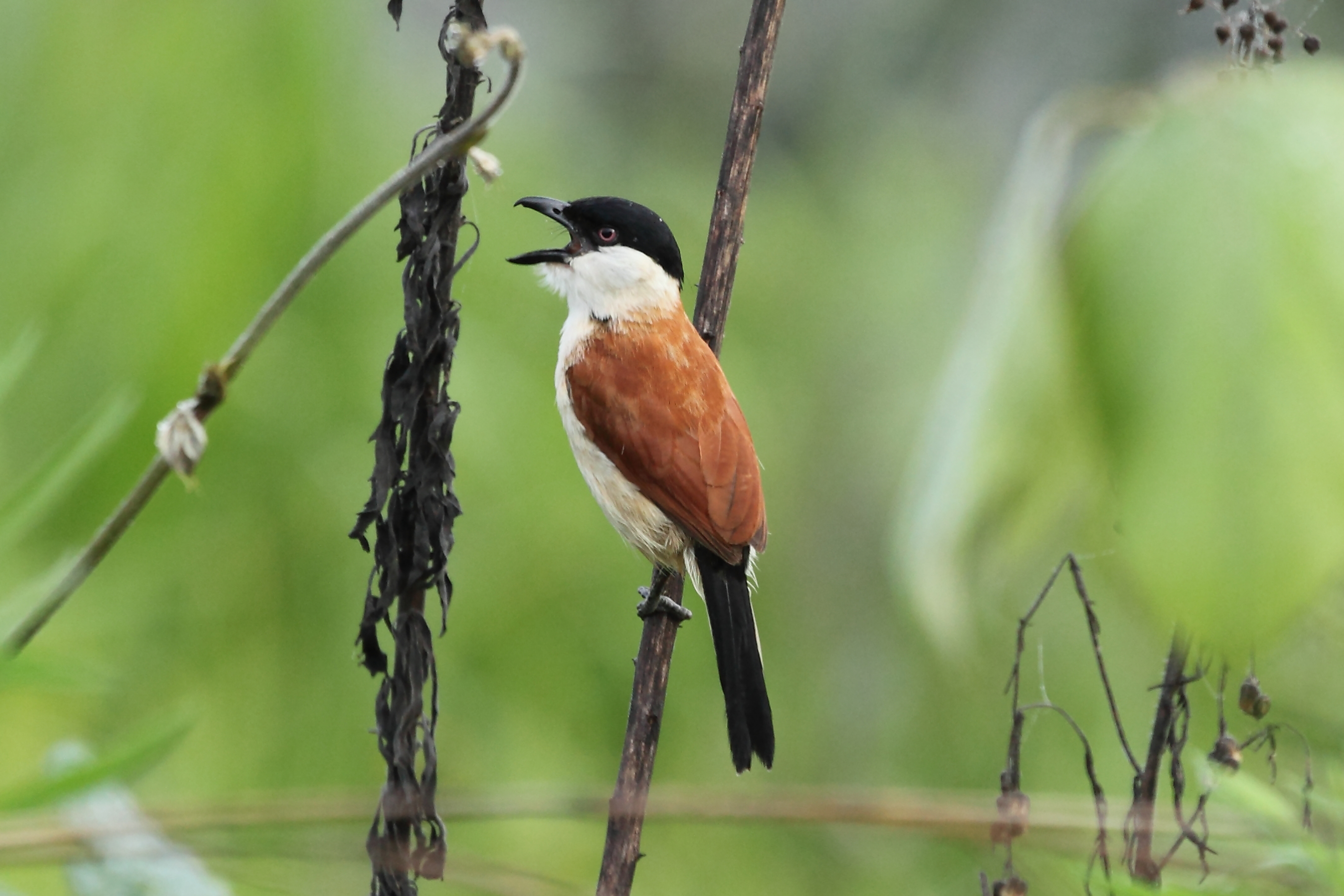
- Adult male B. m. anchietae in the southern DRC
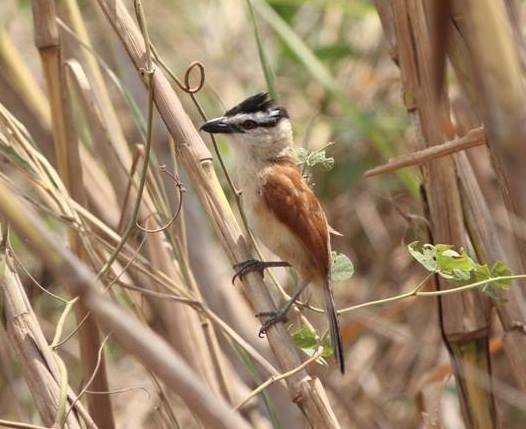
- Adult female B. m. remotus at Caia in central Mozambique

Conservation status
- Least Concern (IUCN 3.1)

Scientific classification
- Kingdom: Animalia
- Phylum: Chordata
- Class: Aves
- Order: Passeriformes
- Family: Malaconotidae
- Genus: Bocagia; Shelley, 1894
- Species: B. minuta

Binomial name
- Bocagia minuta (Hartlaub, 1858)

Synonyms
- Bocagia anchietae; Tchagra minutus; Tchagra anchietae

= Marsh tchagra =

Species of bird

The marsh tchagra or blackcap bush-shrike (Bocagia minuta) is a species of passerine bird placed in the monotypic genus Bocagia in the family Malaconotidae. It is native to marshes in the tropics and subtropics of Africa. It is sometimes placed in the genus Tchagra.

== Taxonomy ==
The marsh tchagra was described by the German ornithologist Gustav Hartlaub in 1858 and given the binomial name Telephonus minutus. The species is now placed in the monotypic genus Bocagia that was introduced by the English ornithologist George Ernest Shelley in 1894.

Three subspecies are recognised.

- B. m. minuta (Hartlaub, 1858) – West Africa and African tropics: Sierra Leone to Ethiopia, west Kenya and northwest Tanzania
- B. m. reichenowi (Neumann, 1900) – east Tanzania, south Malawi, east Zimbabwe and Mozambique
- B. m. anchietae (Bocage, 1869) – Angola to southwest Tanzania and north Malawi

The subspecies B. m. anchietae is sometimes separated as Anchieta's tchagra.

== Distribution and habitat ==
It is widely distributed across central Africa and is found in Angola, Burundi, Cameroon, the Central African Republic, the Republic of the Congo, the Democratic Republic of the Congo, Ivory Coast, Ethiopia, Gabon, Ghana, Guinea, Kenya, Liberia, Malawi, Mozambique, Nigeria, Rwanda, Sierra Leone, Sudan, Tanzania, Togo, Uganda, Zambia, and Zimbabwe.

Its natural habitats are subtropical or tropical moist shrubland, subtropical or tropical seasonally wet or flooded lowland grassland, and swamps.
