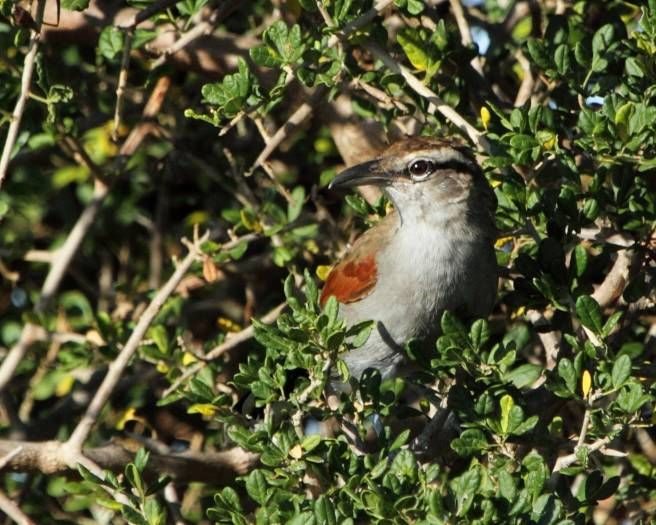

Conservation status
- Least Concern (IUCN 3.1)

Scientific classification
- Kingdom: Animalia
- Phylum: Chordata
- Class: Aves
- Order: Passeriformes
- Family: Malaconotidae
- Genus: Tchagra
- Species: T. tchagra

Binomial name
- Tchagra tchagra (Vieillot, 1816)

= Southern tchagra =

Species of bird

The southern tchagra (Tchagra tchagra) is a passerine bird found in dense scrub and coastal bush in southern and south-eastern South Africa and Eswatini.

This species is a bushshrike, a group closely related to the true shrikes in the family Laniidae, and formerly included in that family.

== Identification ==
The southern tchagra is 17–21 cm in length. It has a brown crown and black eye stripes separated by a broad white supercilium. The underparts are pale grey and the upperparts pale brown. The folded wings are chestnut and the tail is black, tipped white. The longish bill is black. The sexes are similar, but young birds are duller and have a buff stripe through the eye. This species is similar to the black-crowned tchagra, but that species is larger, and the adult, as its name implies, has a black rather than brown crown.

An identification pitfall is that juvenile black-crowned tchagra has a brown crown. It can be separated from southern tchagra by its larger size, relatively shorter bill and paler underparts.

There are three fairly similar subspecies of southern tchagra. Nominate T. t. tchagra of the Western Cape has the darkest underparts and longest bill. T. t. caffrariae has paler underparts and the shortest bill, and T. t. natalensis of eastern South Africa and Eswatini has the palest underparts and a reddish-brown crown.

The male southern tchagra has a descending whistling song, ttttrtr te te te teuuu given in its display flight or from a perch. The female responds with a trilled tzerrrrrrrr.

== Behaviour ==
The cup nest is constructed of twigs and stems in a branch fork in a bush or scrub. Two, sometimes three eggs are laid. These are white, marked with grey and reddish-brown, and hatch after about 16 days, with another 14 days to fledging.

This is a solitary territorial species, less conspicuously than true shrikes, especially when breeding. It forages on the ground for insects and other small prey.
