= Struben Dam Bird Sanctuary =

Protected area in Lynnwood Glen, Pretoria

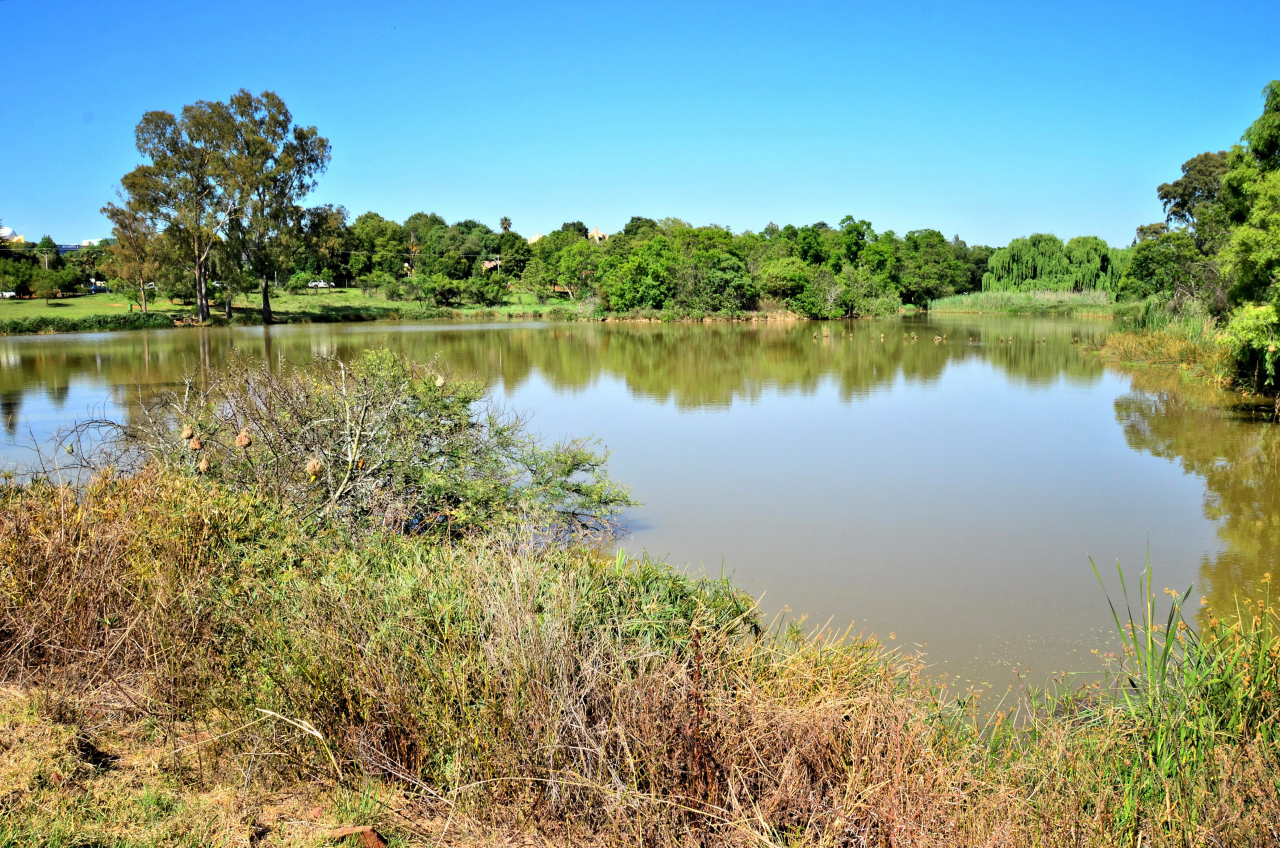
- Struben Dam Bird Sanctuary
- Location: Gauteng, South Africa
- Nearest city: Pretoria
- Coordinates: 25°46′36″S 28°16′44″E
- Governing body: City of Tshwane Metropolitan Municipality
- Website: Struben Dam Bird Sanctuary
- Struben Dam Bird Sanctuary (Gauteng)

The Struben Dam Bird Sanctuary is located in Lynnwood Glen, Pretoria, in part of what was once the farm Hartebeestpoort 362 JR, which was owned by F.E.B. Struben.

== Struben Dam ==
The dam was built in the Waterkloof Spruit and contains 108,000 m^{3}. The dam wall is around 6 m high.

The precise age of the original dam is unknown, but the dam is estimated to have been built from the 1940s to the 1960s. Maps from 1929 don't show the dam.

The dam wall was upgraded in September 1984, and since 1985 it has been used for flood control as well.

== Fauna ==
Bird life is abundant, and a wide variety of fish swim in the reservoir, including banded tilapia, African sharptooth catfish, Canary kurper, carp, and Micropterus.

== Flora ==
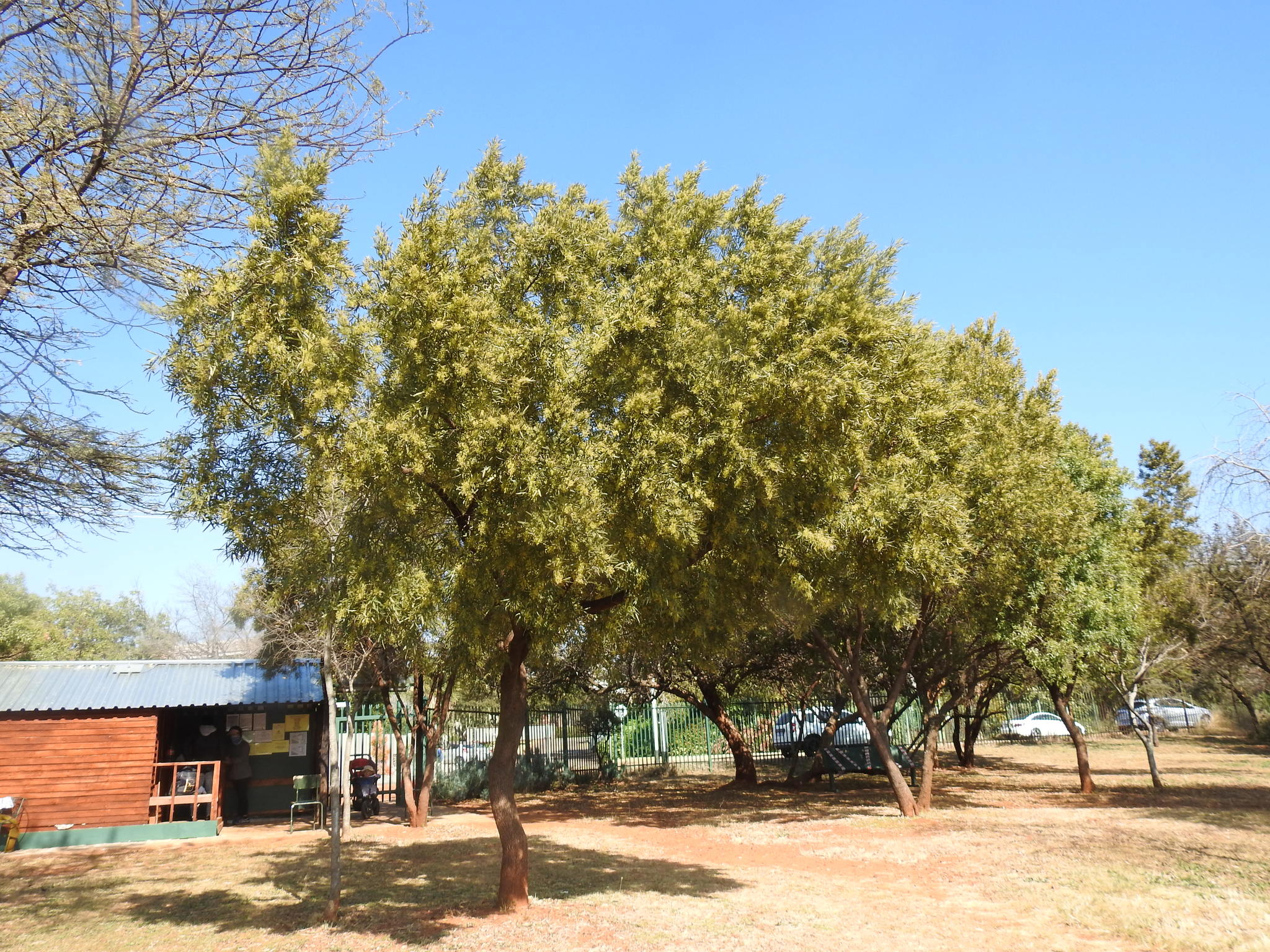
Karee tree

The biome near Struben Dam is bakenveld, a transitional habitat between grassland and bushveld. There are also marsh and shoreline areas under the dam wall. River bushwillow, sweet thorn, hook-thorn, and white stinkwood are the main trees found in the reserve.

== Amenities ==
The reserve is ideal for walking, birdwatching, and picnics. There are bathrooms and large lawns on which to relax. The dam is used for fishing. No campfires are allowed.

== Hours ==
Summer (September - April): 06:00 - 18:00

Winter (May - August): 06:00 - 18:00

== See also ==
- Faerie Glen Nature Reserve
