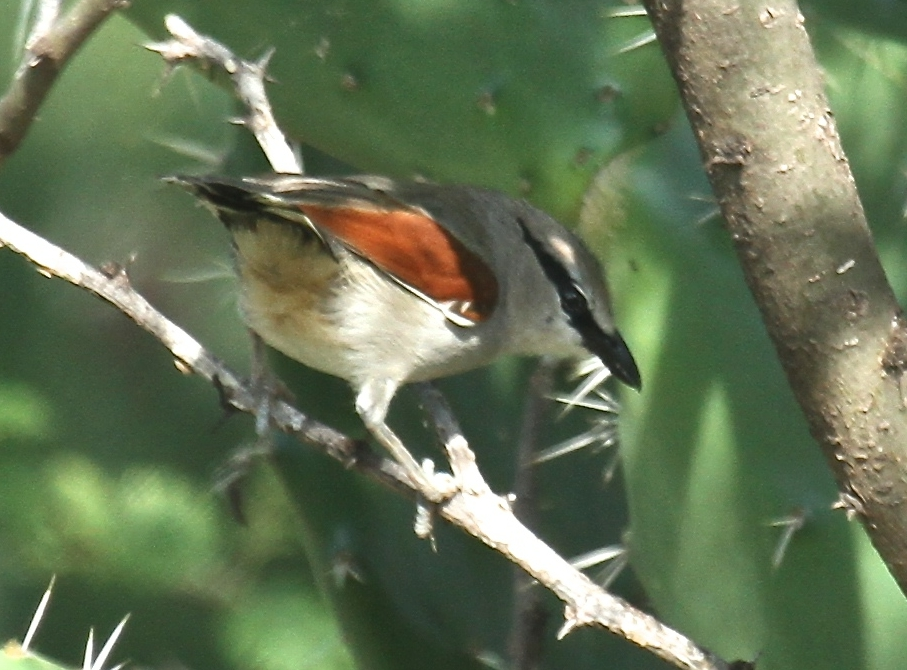

Conservation status
- Least Concern (IUCN 3.1)

Scientific classification
- Kingdom: Animalia
- Phylum: Chordata
- Class: Aves
- Order: Passeriformes
- Family: Malaconotidae
- Genus: Tchagra
- Species: T. jamesi

Binomial name
- Tchagra jamesi (Shelley, 1885)

= Three-streaked tchagra =

Species of bird

The three-streaked tchagra (Tchagra jamesi) is a species of bird in the family Malaconotidae, which is an uncommon resident of semi-desert regions in the eastern Afrotropics. The binomial of this bird commemorates the explorer Frank Linsly James, who also had the Frank James Memorial Hospital built in his honour.

== Range and habitat ==
It is found in Ethiopia, Kenya, Somalia, South Sudan, Tanzania, and Uganda. Its natural habitats are dry savanna and subtropical or tropical dry shrubland.

== Description ==
It is a small tchagra, measuring 16–17 cm from bill tip to tail tip. They are distinct from other tchagra species in having a narrow, black median stripe over the crown, without any superciliary stripe. In addition the tertials and rectrices are mouse-brown in colour.

== Habits ==
The male displays by fripping the wings in flight, followed by a series of down-slurred whistles. They feed to a large extent on insects, but may in addition prey on chicks of other birds.

== Races ==
There are two accepted races:

- T. j. jamesi (Shelley, 1885) – Uganda, Ethiopia, Somalia, inland Kenya and very locally in South Sudan and Tanzania
- T. j. mandanus (Neumann, 1903) – Kenyan coast and adjacent islands
