= White-browed coucal =

- in north Serengeti, Tanzania

Conservation status
- Least Concern (IUCN 3.1)

Scientific classification
- Kingdom: Animalia
- Phylum: Chordata
- Class: Aves
- Order: Cuculiformes
- Family: Cuculidae
- Genus: Centropus
- Species: C. superciliosus

Binomial name
- Centropus superciliosus Hemprich & Ehrenberg, 1829

Species of bird

The white-browed coucal or lark-heeled cuckoo (Centropus superciliosus), is a species of cuckoo in the family Cuculidae. It is found in sub-Saharan Africa. It inhabits areas with thick cover afforded by rank undergrowth and scrub, including in suitable coastal regions. Burchell's coucal is sometimes considered a subspecies.

== Description ==
The white-browed coucal is a medium-sized species growing to 36 to 42 cm (14 to 17 in) in length. The sexes are similar, adults having a blackish crown and nape, a white supercilium, rufous-brown back, chestnut wings, blackish rump and black tail, glossed with green, with a white tip. The underparts are creamy-white, the eyes red, the beak black, and the legs and feet greyish-black or black. Juveniles have rufous streaking on the crown, a faint buff supercilium, barred upper parts and darker underparts.

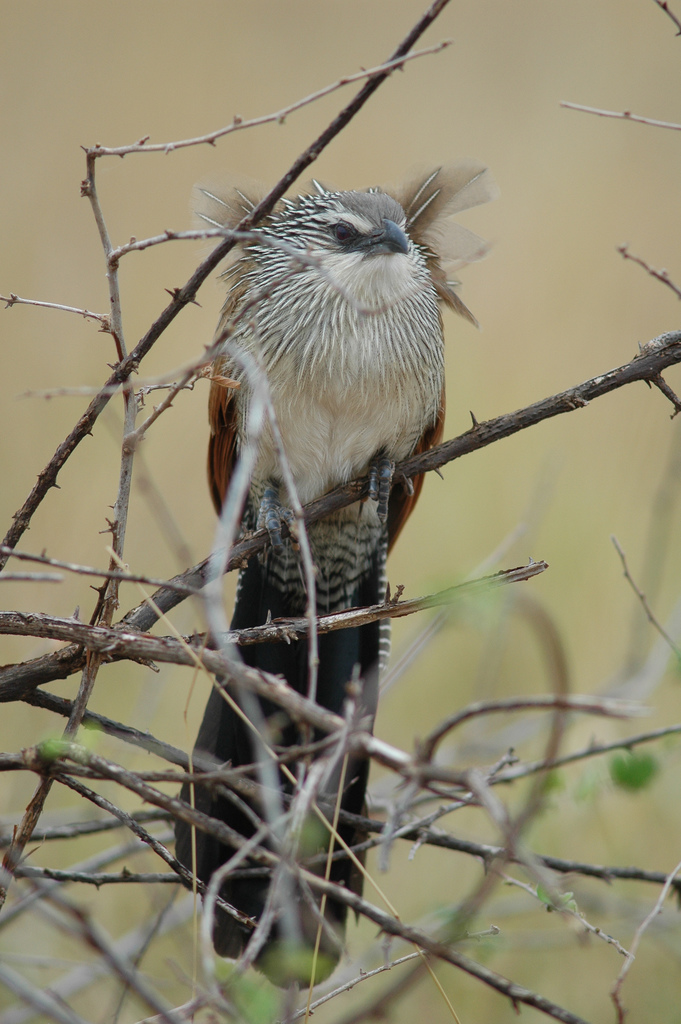
Juvenile

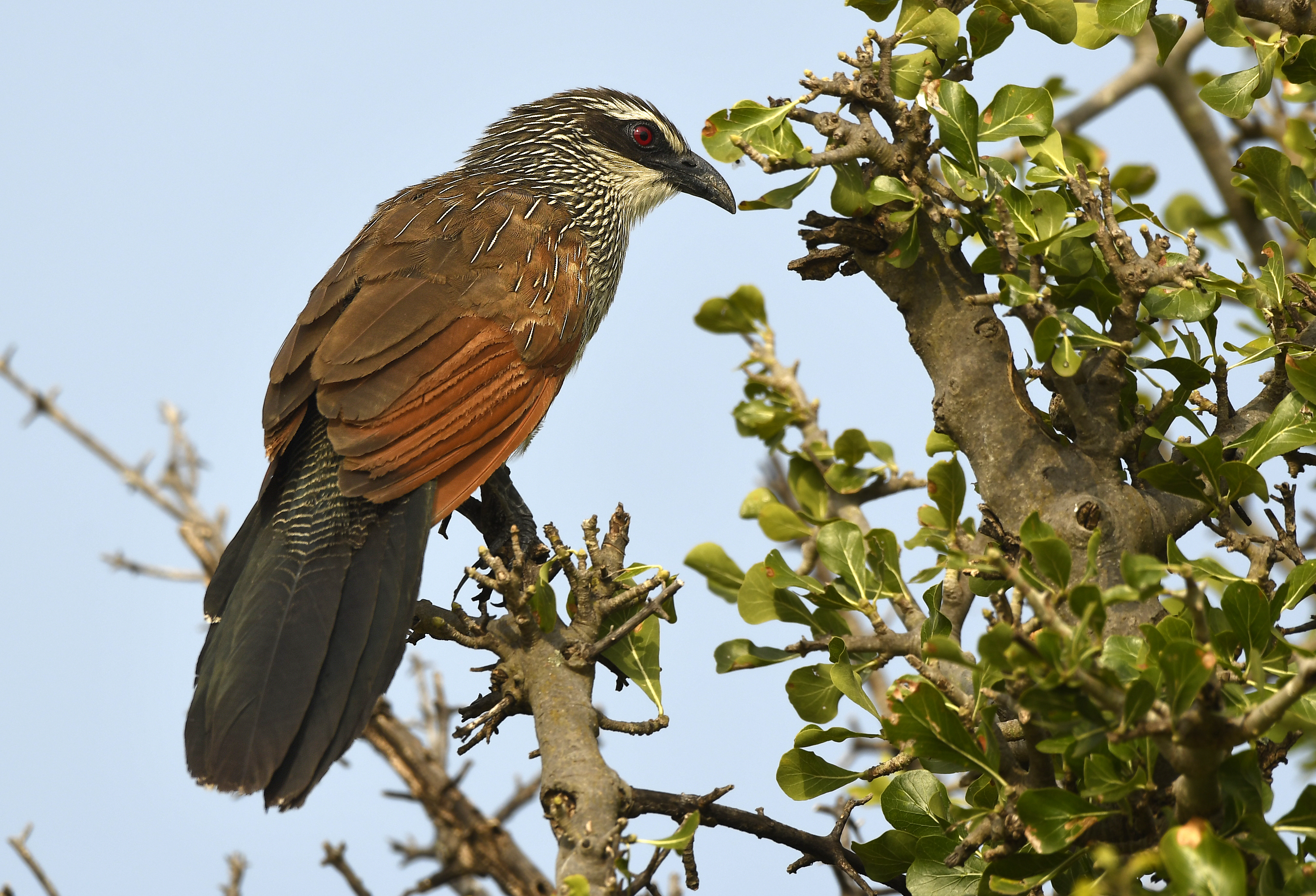
White-browed Coucal Adult

== Distribution ==
The white-browed coucal is native to eastern and southern Africa, and the southwestern part of the Arabian Peninsula. Its range includes Angola, Botswana, Burundi, Congo, Democratic Republic of Congo, Djibouti, Eritrea, Ethiopia, Kenya, Malawi, Namibia, Rwanda, Somalia, South Sudan, Sudan, Tanzania, Uganda, Zambia and Zimbabwe in Africa, as well as Saudi Arabia and Yemen. It is a common species with a very wide range and the International Union for Conservation of Nature has listed it as a "least-concern species".
