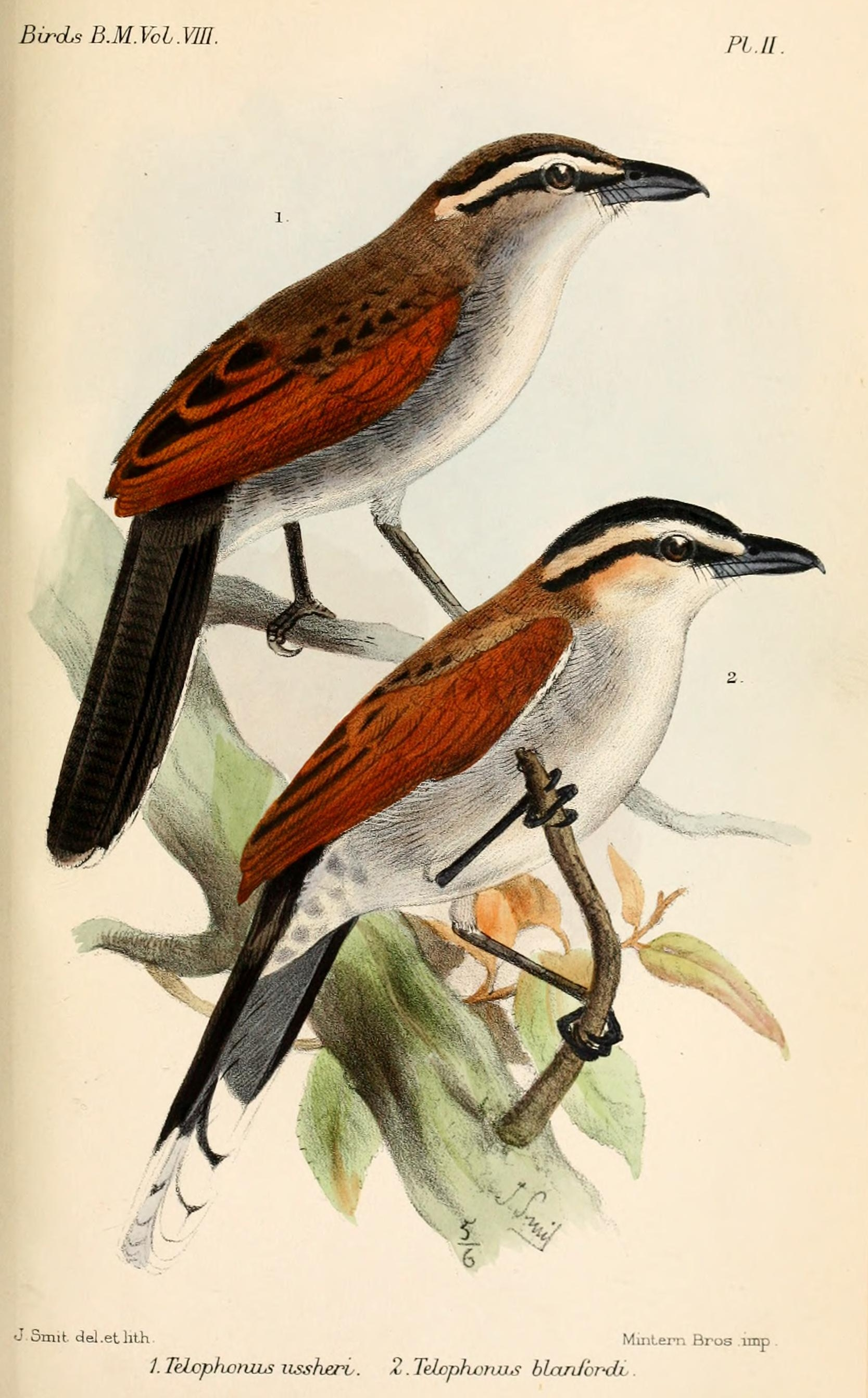
- Brown-crowned (above) and Black-crowned tchagra (below)

Scientific classification
- Kingdom: Animalia
- Phylum: Chordata
- Class: Aves
- Order: Passeriformes
- Family: Malaconotidae
- Genus: Tchagra; Lesson, 1831

Type species
- Thamnophilus tchagra Vieillot, 1816

Species
- See text

= Tchagra =

Genus of birds

The tchagras are passerine birds in the bushshrike family, which are closely related to the true shrikes in the family Laniidae, and were once included in that group.

== Description ==
These are long-tailed birds, typically with a grey or grey-brown back, brown wings and grey and whitish underparts. The head pattern is distinctive, with a dark cap and black eyestripe separated by a white supercilium. The bill is strong and hooked.

The male and female are similar in plumage in all tchagra species, but distinguishable from immature birds.

These are solitary birds which tend to skulk low down or on the ground. They have distinctive whistled calls and can be readily tempted into sight by imitating the call, presumably because the tchagra is concerned that there is an intruder in its territory.

These are species typically of scrub, open woodland, semi-desert and cultivation in sub-Saharan Africa. They hunt large insects from a low perch in a bush, and the larger species like black-crowned tchagra will also take vertebrate prey such as frogs and snakes.

== Extant Species ==
The genus Tchagra was introduced by the French naturalist René Lesson in 1831 with the southern tchagra as the type species. The genus contains four species:

| Image | Scientific name | Common name | Distribution |
|---|---|---|---|
| | Tchagra australis | Brown-crowned tchagra or brown-headed tchagra | Angola, Benin, Botswana, Burundi, Cameroon, Central African Republic, Republic of the Congo, DRC, Ivory Coast, Gabon, Ghana, Guinea, Kenya, Liberia, Malawi, Mali, Mozambique, Namibia, Nigeria, Rwanda, Sierra Leone, South Africa, South Sudan, Swaziland, Tanzania, Togo, Uganda, Zambia, and Zimbabwe. |
| | Tchagra jamesi | Three-streaked tchagra | Ethiopia, Kenya, Somalia, South Sudan, Tanzania, and Uganda |
| | Tchagra tchagra | Southern tchagra | southern and south-eastern South Africa and Swaziland. |
| | Tchagra senegalus | Black-crowned tchagra | Arabian peninsula and most of Africa in scrub |

The marsh tchagra Bocagia minuta is sometimes placed in the genus. The dark Angolan subspecies of marsh tchagra was formerly sometimes split as Anchieta's tchagra, Tchagra anchietae, named after Portuguese explorer José Alberto de Oliveira Anchieta by his zoologist compatriot José Vicente Barbosa du Bocage in 1869.
