= GreenBottle =

GreenBottle Ltd (now dissolved and in no way related to Greenbottle Limited incorporated in March 2016) was the manufacturer of sustainable, paper-based liquids packaging. In 2017, Ecologic Brands Inc., based in Manteca, California, purchased the assets of the former GreenBottle.

GreenBottle was developed in 2005 by inventor Martin Myerscough following a chance encounter with a waste tip manager. Myerscough was told that the biggest problem at waste tips is the abundance of plastic milk bottles. With less than 8 years of landfill in the UK remaining, Myerscough was inspired by his son's (Jamie Myerscough's) papier-mâché balloon to create a moulded paper bottle with a thin plastic lining.

GreenBottle was initially produced as a milk bottle exclusive to national British retailer Asda.

Following the successful launch of the GreenBottle milk container, the company unveiled its designs for a paper wine bottle. The launch was met with international enthusiasm, gaining press coverage, and eventually sales, from around the world.

GreenBottle is a commercially viable, environmentally green alternative to plastic, glass and laminated cartons.

== The process ==
The bottles are made by moulding the pulp of wood fibre which is then pressed into shape. The plastic liner is automatically vacuum formed and inserted into one half shell, another half shell is placed on top and the two are then sealed together. The bottles are designed to easily integrate with existing filling lines. The bottles can be printed, labelled and/or embossed.

== Environmental benefits ==
Packaging is the largest contributor to a product's carbon footprint - accounting for between 30-70% of the total emissions.

== Compared to glass ==
GreenBottle has an estimated 10% of the carbon footprint of glass and weighs just one sixth of an average wine glass bottle, making it much more fuel efficient to transport both in bulk and for consumers. Glass is often regarded as a green form of packaging but its production process is highly energy intensive and whilst 62% of glass is recycled in the UK, only 50% of this is remelted. The balance is either destined for land fill, road aggregate or fibreglass insulation manufacture.

In the UK more than 1.2 billion wine bottles are used every year. Although recyclable, glass containers are constituted of varying degrees of recycled glass. Green glass is made of 76% recycled glass content, clear glass just 29%.

== Compared to plastic bottles ==
Plastic bottles require up to 4.5 times the amount carbon to produce compared to a milk GreenBottle. Most plastic, even if it has been recycled several times, is eventually bound for landfill where it persists indefinitely. In 2010, there were warnings that the UK had just eight years of landfill remaining and the EU Landfill Directive legally binds the UK to reduce its municipal waste, by 2020, to 35% of 1995 dumping levels. Much of the 15 million plastic bottles consumed daily in the UK still ends up in landfill where it will persist for more than 500 years. Only 35% of PET bottles are recycled.

In contrast, the paper bottle can be composted in as little as 12 weeks and recycled with paper recycling. The GreenBottle bottle uses less than one third of the amount of plastic in a standard UK milk bottle.

== Compared to laminated cartons ==
The laminated carton was among the most innovative developments in packaging over the last 60 years. Laminated cartons are made from layers of paper board fused with a plastic lining containing a small amount of aluminium. The packaging can keep liquids fresh over long distances and periods of time, locked within a safe seal. The composition of laminated cartons makes it difficult to separate the various components from the paper. Recycling cartons is therefore more complicated than simply recycling paper and/or pieces of plastic. There are no recycling facilities available for laminated cartons in the UK at the moment so post-consumer cartons that are collected by local councils are sent to land fill in the UK or shipped to mainland Europe for incineration or specialist recycling. The global recycling rate of laminated cartons is approximately 20% of the 175 billion cartons sold in 2011.

== Awards ==
GreenBottle was the winner of the Best Small Companies category at the 2012 Rethink Awards, hosted by Planet Workshops. A few weeks later, it was also shortlisted for Most Sustainable Small Organisation by the International Green Awards.
