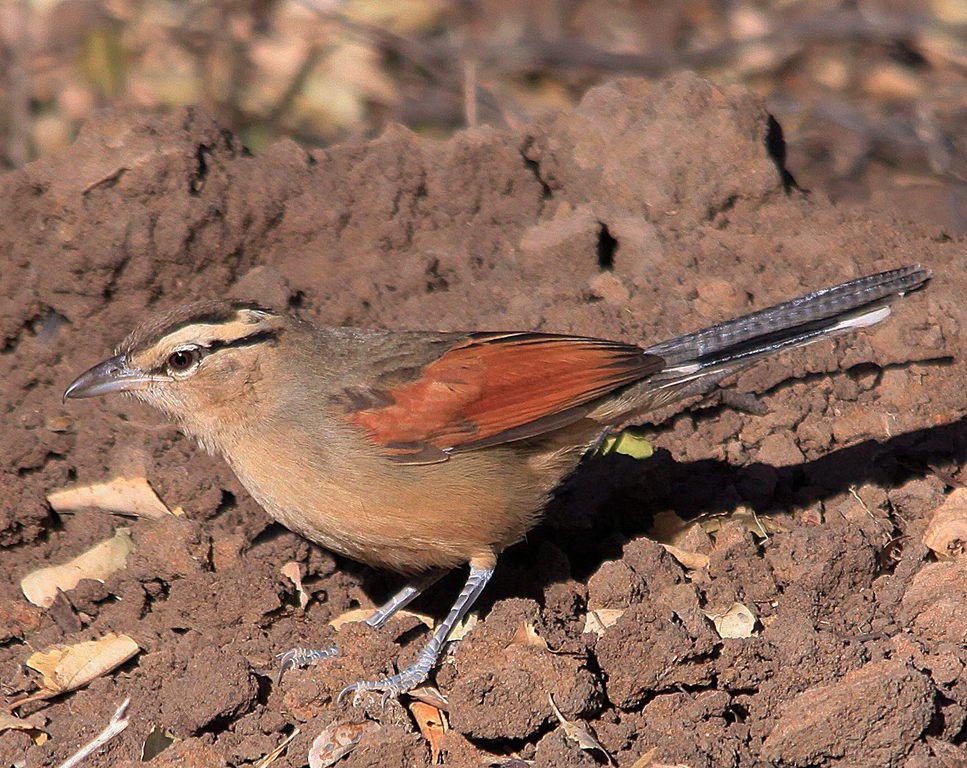
- Nominate race at Marakele N. P., South Africa

Conservation status
- Least Concern (IUCN 3.1)

Scientific classification
- Kingdom: Animalia
- Phylum: Chordata
- Class: Aves
- Order: Passeriformes
- Family: Malaconotidae
- Genus: Tchagra
- Species: T. australis

Binomial name
- Tchagra australis (Smith, 1836)

Synonyms
- Telophonus trivirgatus

= Brown-crowned tchagra =

Species of bird

The brown-crowned tchagra (Tchagra australis) is a species of bird in the family Malaconotidae.

== Range and habitat ==
It is found in Angola, Benin, Botswana, Burundi, Cameroon, Central African Republic, Republic of the Congo, DRC, Eswatini, Ivory Coast, Gabon, Ghana, Guinea, Kenya, Liberia, Malawi, Mali, Mozambique, Namibia, Nigeria, Rwanda, Sierra Leone, South Africa, South Sudan, Tanzania, Togo, Uganda, Zambia, and Zimbabwe. Its natural habitats are subtropical or tropical dry forests and dry savanna.
