= Brown house snake =

Brown house snake or brown house-snake may refer to:

- Boaedon capensis
- African house snake (Boaedon fuliginosus, syn. Lamprophis fuliginosus)
