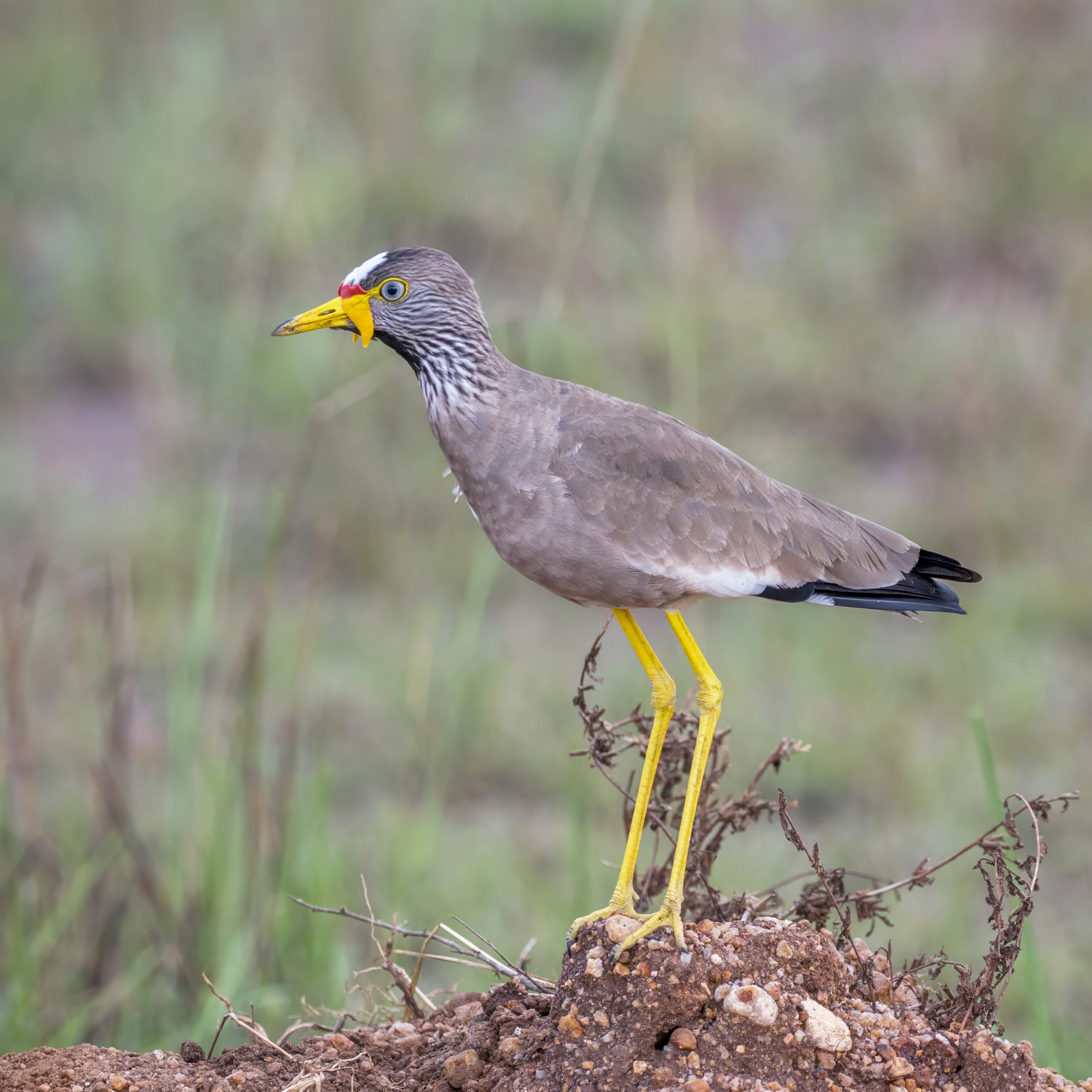
- Semuliki Wildlife Reserve, Uganda

Conservation status
- Least Concern (IUCN 3.1)

Scientific classification
- Kingdom: Animalia
- Phylum: Chordata
- Class: Aves
- Order: Charadriiformes
- Family: Charadriidae
- Genus: Vanellus
- Species: V. senegallus

Binomial name
- Vanellus senegallus (Linnaeus, 1766)

Synonyms
- Afribyx senegallus (Linnaeus, 1766); Parra senegalla Linnaeus, 1766

= African wattled lapwing =

Species of bird

The African wattled lapwing (Vanellus senegallus), also known as the Senegal wattled plover or simply wattled lapwing, is a large lapwing, a group of largish waders in the family Charadriidae. It is a resident breeder in most of sub-Saharan Africa outside the rainforests, although it has seasonal movements.

These are conspicuous and unmistakable birds. They are large brown waders with a black crown, white forehead and large yellow facial wattles. The tail is white, tipped black, and the long legs are yellow.

In flight, the upperwings have black flight feathers and brown coverts separated by a white bar. The underwings are white with black flight feathers. The African wattled lapwing has a loud peep-peep call.

This species is a common breeder in wet lowland habitats, especially damp grassland. It often feeds in drier habitats, such as golf courses, picking insects and other invertebrates from the ground. It lays three or four eggs on a ground scrape.

The African wattled lapwing is one of the species to which the Agreement on the Conservation of African-Eurasian Migratory Waterbirds (AEWA) applies.

== Gallery ==
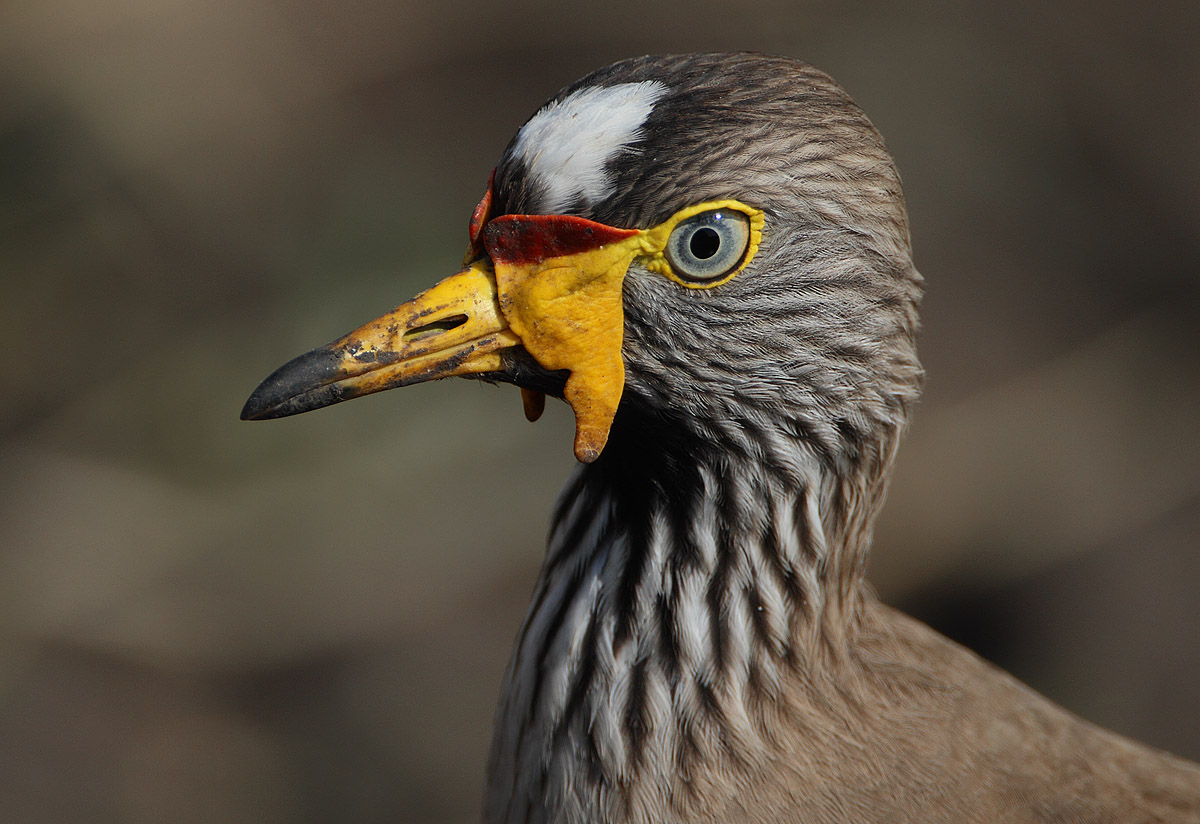
Upper body

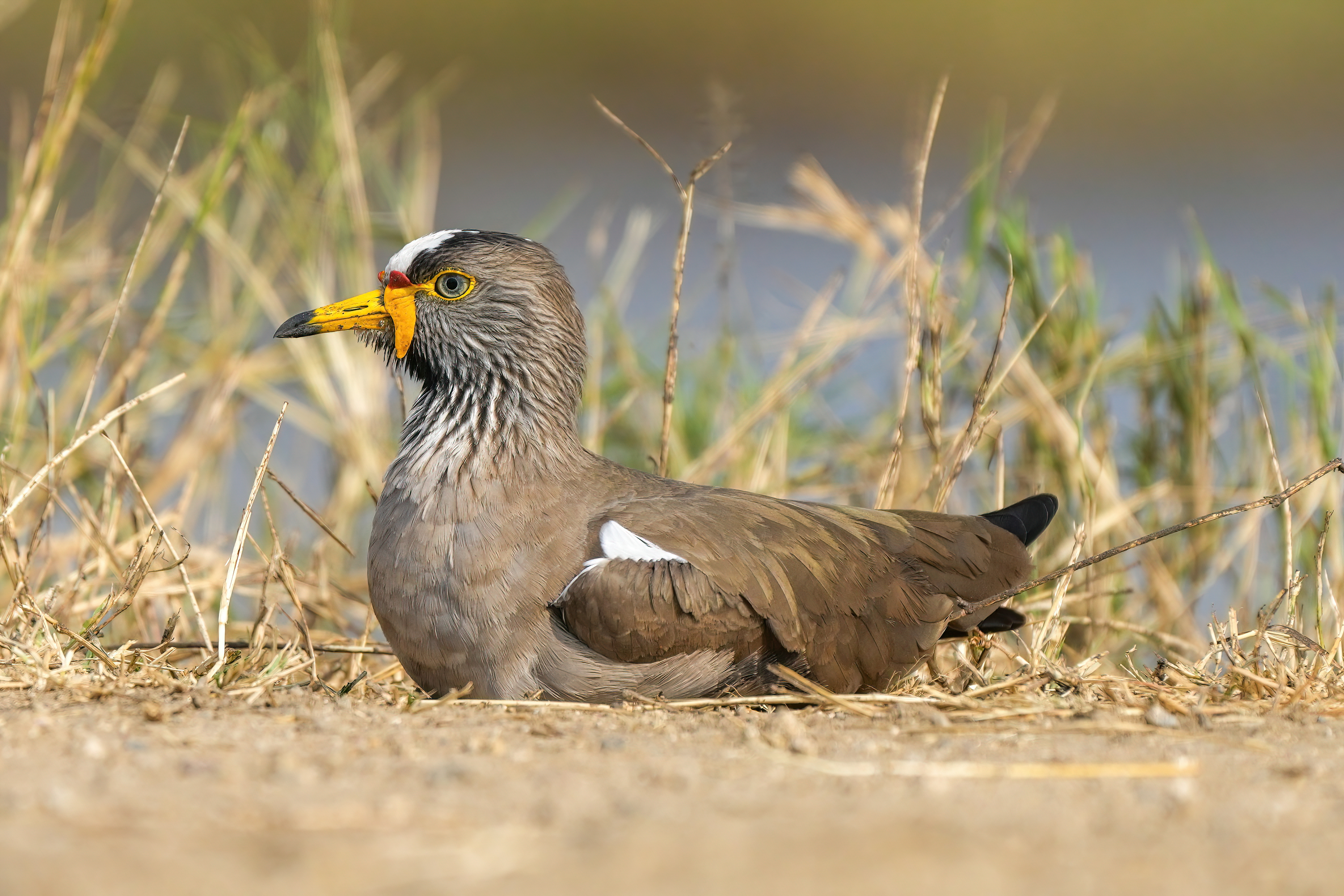
Incubating eggs

== Bibliography ==
- Shorebirds by Hayman, Marchant and Prater ISBN 0-395-60237-8
