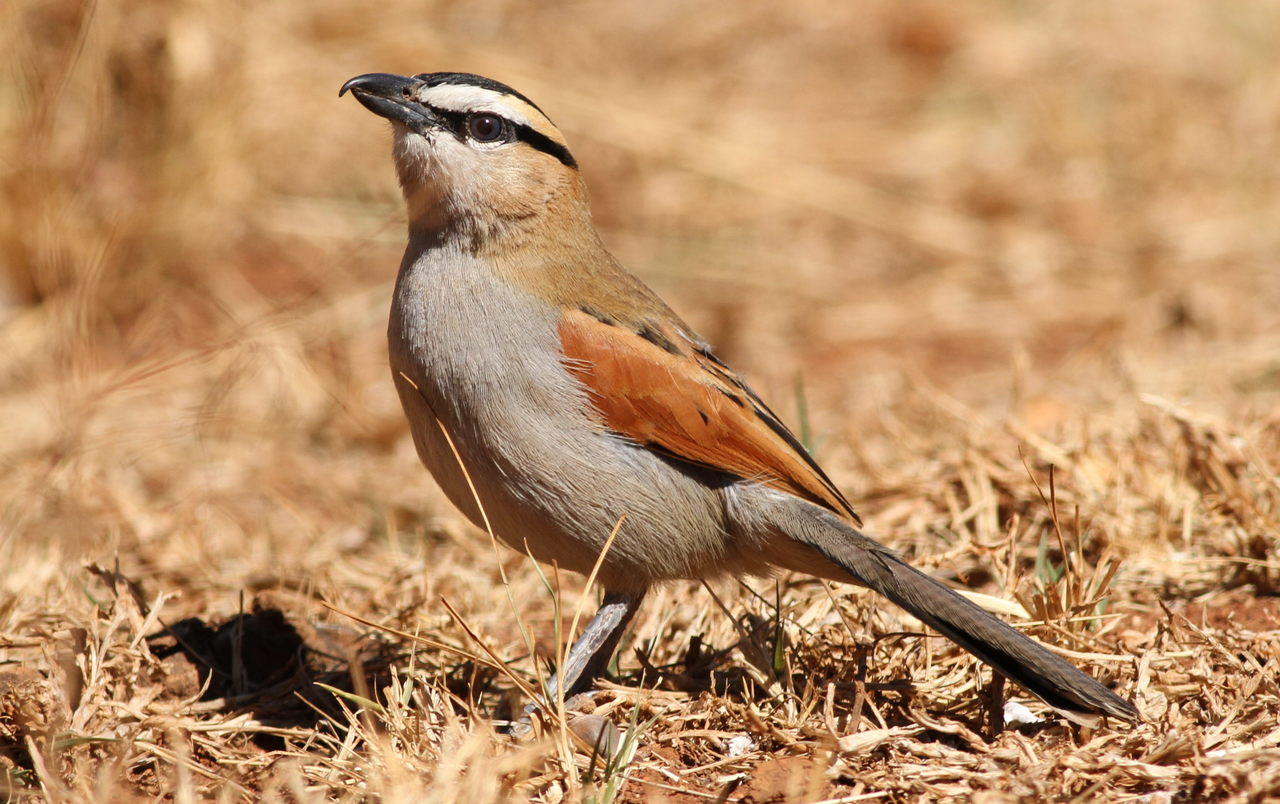

Conservation status
- Least Concern (IUCN 3.1)

Scientific classification
- Kingdom: Animalia
- Phylum: Chordata
- Class: Aves
- Order: Passeriformes
- Family: Malaconotidae
- Genus: Tchagra
- Species: T. senegalus

Binomial name
- Tchagra senegalus (Linnaeus, 1766)

Synonyms
- Lanius senegalus Linnaeus, 1766; Tchagra senegala

Audio
- Song recorded in Kiboko, Kenya

= Black-crowned tchagra =

Species of bird

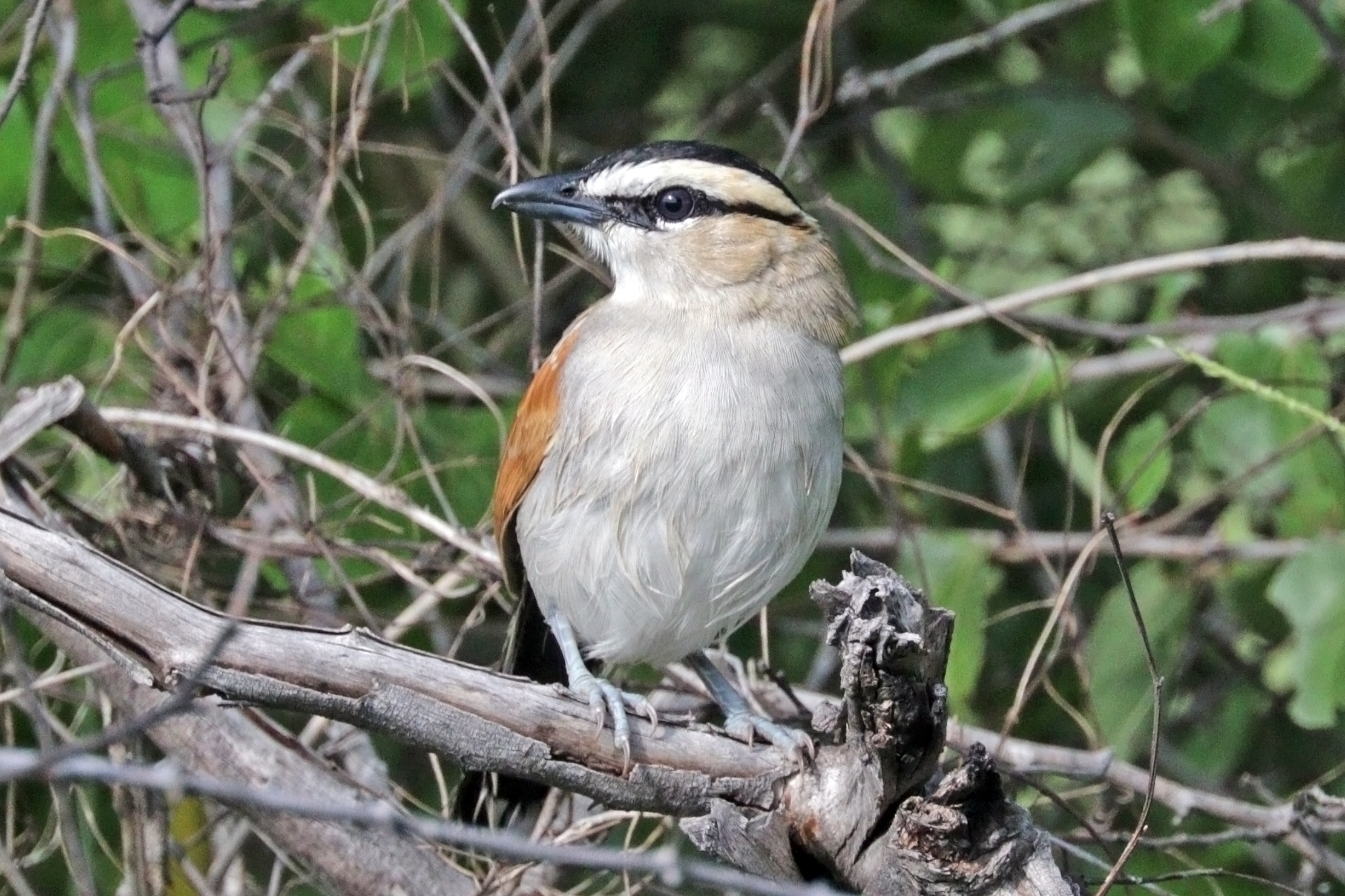
Tchagra senegalus kalahari Nkasa Rupara National Park, Namibia

The black-crowned tchagra (Tchagra senegalus) is a bushshrike. This family of passerine birds is closely related to the true shrikes in the family Laniidae, and was once included in that group.

This species is found in the Arabian Peninsula and most of Africa in scrub, open woodland, semi-desert and cultivation.

== Taxonomy ==
In 1760 the French zoologist Mathurin Jacques Brisson included a description of the black-crowned tchagra in his Ornithologie based on a specimen collected in Senegal. He used the French name La pie-griesche gris du Sénégal and the Latin Lanius Senegalensis cinereus. Although Brisson coined Latin names, these do not conform to the binomial system and are not recognised by the International Commission on Zoological Nomenclature. When in 1766 the Swedish naturalist Carl Linnaeus updated his Systema Naturae for the twelfth edition, he added 240 species that had been previously described by Brisson. One of these was the black-crowned tchagra. Linnaeus included a brief description, coined the binomial name Lanius senegalus and cited Brisson's work. The species is now placed in the genus Tchagra that was introduced by the French naturalist René Lesson in 1831. Nine subspecies are recognised.

=== Subspecies ===
Nine subspecies are accepted:

- Tchagra senegalus cucullatus (Temminck, CJ, 1840) — coastal Morocco, Algeria, and Tunisia north of the Atlas Mountains
- Tchagra senegalus percivali (Ogilvie-Grant, WR, 1900) — southern Arabian Peninsula
- Tchagra senegalus remigialis (Hartlaub, KJG; Finsch, FHO, 1870) — central Chad to central Sudan (Darfur, Kordofan, and Nile Valley)
- Tchagra senegalus nothus (Reichenow, A, 1920) — Mali to northern Nigeria and Lake Chad
- Tchagra senegalus senegalus (Linnaeus, C, 1766) — Senegal and Sierra Leone to Mali, southern Chad, and Central African Republic
- Tchagra senegalus habessinicus (Ehrenberg, CG, 1833) — southern Sudan to Eritrea, Ethiopia, and Somalia
- Tchagra senegalus armenus (Oberholser, HC, 1906) — southern Cameroon southward to Angola and eastward to northern Democratic Republic of the Congo, western South Sudan, Uganda, western Kenya, and Tanzania, southward to Malawi, northern Mozambique, and northern Zimbabwe
- Tchagra senegalus orientalis (Cabanis, JL, 1869) — southern Somalia southward through coastal Kenya and eastern Tanzania to central and eastern Zimbabwe, Mozambique, eastern South Africa (south to Eastern Cape), and Eswatini
- Tchagra senegalus kalahari (Roberts, A, 1932) — southern Angola, northern Namibia, southwestern Zambia, and northwestern Zimbabwe to northern South Africa

== Description ==
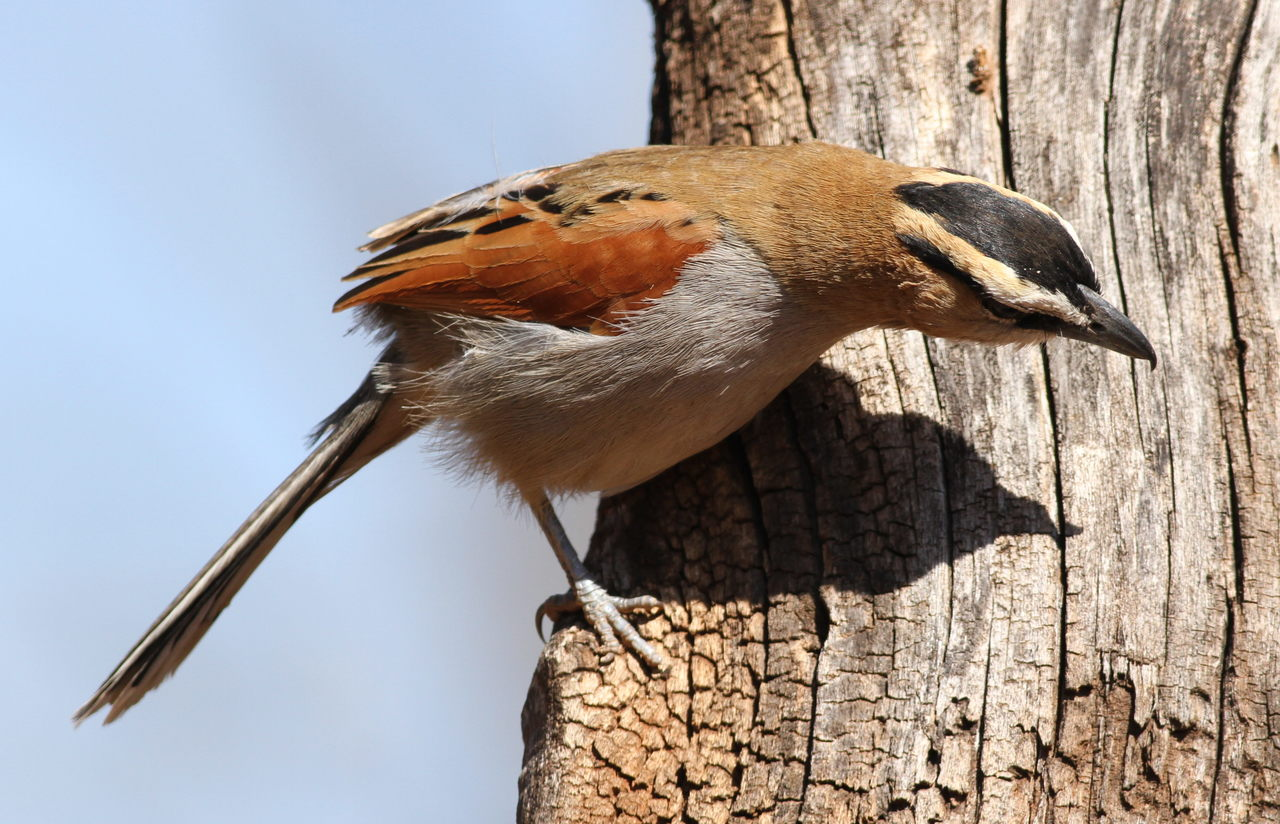
Adults have a solid black crown, bordered by buff superciliary stripes, but juveniles have a brownish crown.

The black-crowned tchagra is a colourful and unmistakable species, 19–22 cm in length. It has a black crown and eye stripes separated by a broad white supercilium. The underparts are pale grey and the upperparts pale brown. The folded wings are chestnut and the tail is black, tipped white. The bill is black.

Sexes are similar, but young birds have a brown cap and a pale yellow bill. There are 14 subspecies, varying in size and the colour of the back, underparts and eyestripe.

Black-crowned tchagra has a descending whistling song, chee-chee chee cheroo cheroo, and can be readily tempted into sight by imitating this call, presumably because the bird is concerned that there is an intruder in its territory. The male also has a switchback display flight.

== Behaviour ==
Black-crowned tchagra lays two or three heavily marked white eggs in a cup nest in a tree or bush. Both sexes, but mainly the female, incubate for 12–15 days to hatching; the chicks fledge after another 15 days.

It is similar in habits to the shrikes, hunting insects and other small prey from a perch in a bush, although it sits less conspicuously than true shrikes.
