= Common fiscal =

The common fiscal has been split into two species:

- Northern fiscal, Lanius humeralis
- Southern fiscal, Lanius collaris
