= Bluebottle =

Bluebottle or blue bottle can mean:

== Organisms ==
- Blow-flies (Calliphoridae) of genus Calliphora and similar species from other genera
  - Specifically, the blue bottle fly Calliphora vomitoria
- Physalia utriculus, stinging marine siphonophores resembling jellyfish and known as bluebottles in Australia, South Africa and New Zealand
- Blue ant, a species of large solitary parasitic wasp
- Centaurea cyanus, the cornflower
- Graphium sarpedon, common bluebottle, or blue triangle butterfly

== Other ==
- Blue bottle (chemical reaction)
- The Blue Bottle Coffee House, Vienna, founded in 1686
- Blue Bottle Coffee, roaster based in Oakland, California, US
- Bluebottle (character), in The Goon Show
- Bluebottle OS, computer operating system
- Fizzy Blue Bottles, a type of sour sweets
- A slang term for a police officer
- Bluebottle, Australian unmanned surface vehicle
