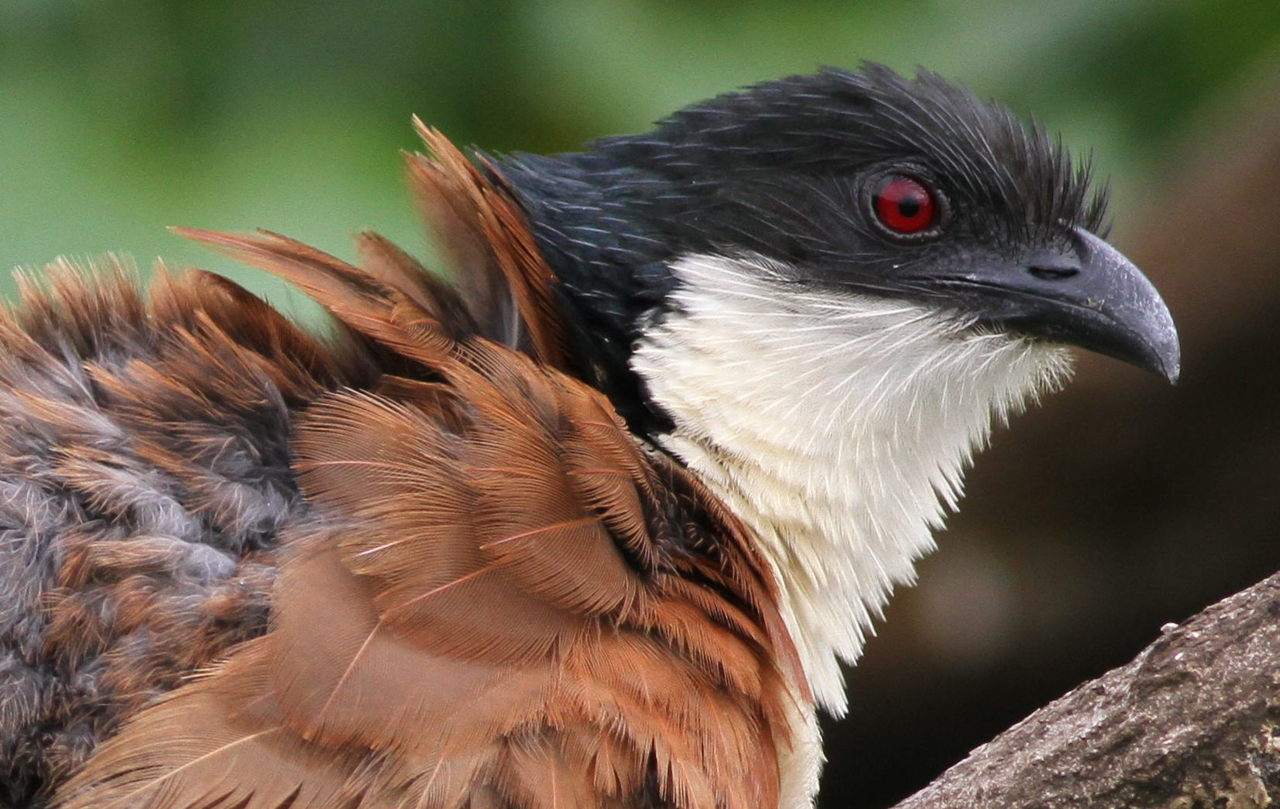

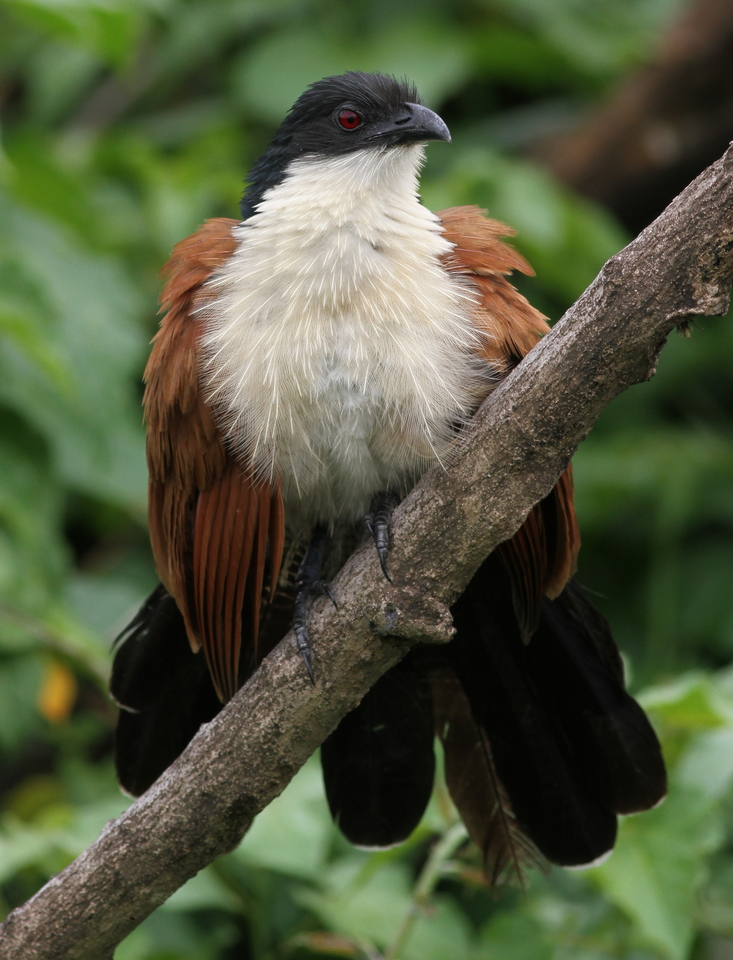
- Nominate subspecies in Kruger Park

Scientific classification
- Domain: Eukaryota
- Kingdom: Animalia
- Phylum: Chordata
- Class: Aves
- Order: Cuculiformes
- Family: Cuculidae
- Genus: Centropus
- Species: C. burchellii

Binomial name
- Centropus burchellii Swainson, 1838

= Burchell's coucal =

Species of bird

Burchell's coucal (Centropus burchellii) is a species of cuckoo in the family Cuculidae. It is found in the southeastern parts of sub-Saharan Africa. It inhabits areas with thick cover afforded by rank undergrowth and scrub, including in suitable coastal regions. Common names include gewone vleiloerie in Afrikaans and umGugwane or uFukwe in Zulu. It is sometimes considered a subspecies of the white-browed coucal, which replaces it to the north and west. The juvenile plumages and calls of the two taxa are hardly distinguishable. The species is named after the British naturalist William John Burchell.

== Subspecies ==
Two subspecies are recognized:

- Centropus burchellii burchellii — southeastern Botswana, Eswatini, western Lesotho, southern Mozambique and South Africa (all nine provinces, though excluding the dry interior)
- Centropus burchellii fasciipygialis — northwards of the Limpopo River: southeastern Zimbabwe, central and northern Mozambique, southern Malawi (southwards of Viphya Plateau) and southeastern Tanzania (including Mafia Island)

C. b. fasciipygialis has starker plumage colours, the head being solid black and the underparts whiter, besides less streaking caused by contrasting feather shafts. In adults the barred rump and tail covert feathers distinguishes it from the white-browed coucal.

== Habits ==
This common resident of southern Africa is usually seen as a solitary individual or in pairs. They prefer clambering through thickets in bushveld, marshes, riparian fringes or coastal bush. It is more often heard than it is seen. When it does fly, the flight is ponderous and ends with a long glide to the next thicket.

== Voice ==
This bird has a distinctive call, which resembles water pouring from a bottle, and various other calls such as the "dove" call and an alarm hiss. The birds are most vocal in the breeding season, and a couple may call in duet, or several birds may call in concert.

== Nesting ==
Between September and February (austral summer) a large matted nest is normally made in a thorn tree. Usually four white eggs are laid, and these hatch out after 14 to 18 days. Both parents feed the nestlings for another three weeks.

== Food ==
Burchell's coucal is predatory, stalking through thick bush and eating insects (including Orthoptera), snails, amphibians (frogs and toads), reptiles (including lizards and chameleons) and birds up to the size of a laughing dove. Nests of other birds are often raided.

== Gallery ==
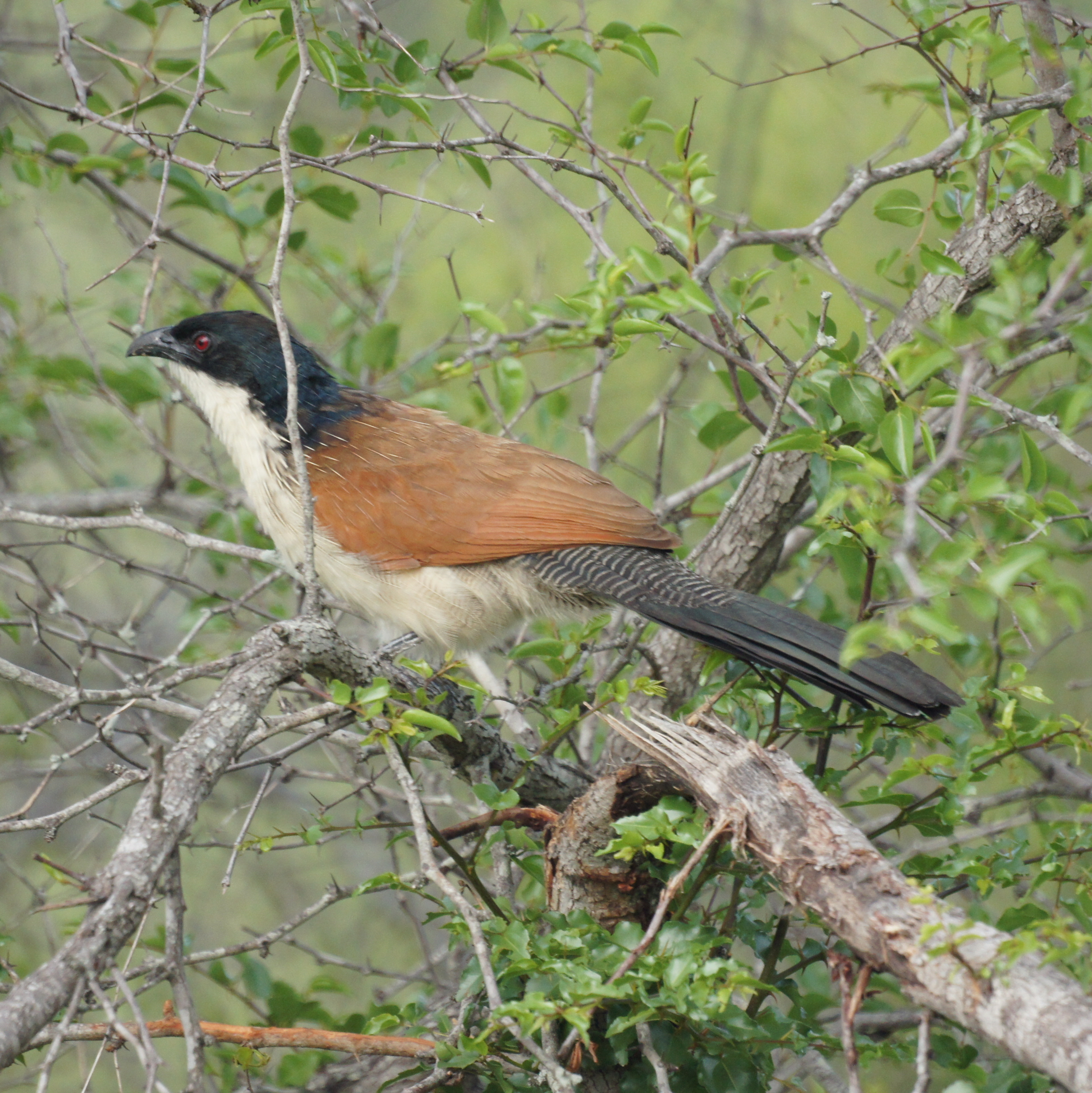
Finely barred rump and tail coverts, combined with unmarked underpart plumage, are field marks of adult birds

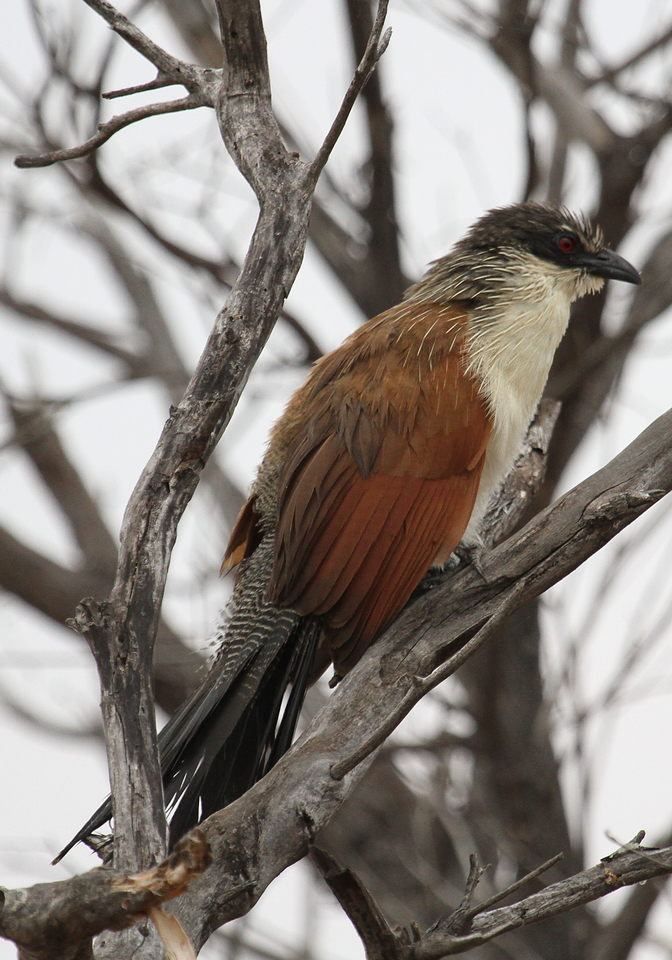
Individual with creamy-white supercilium and heavily streaked nape

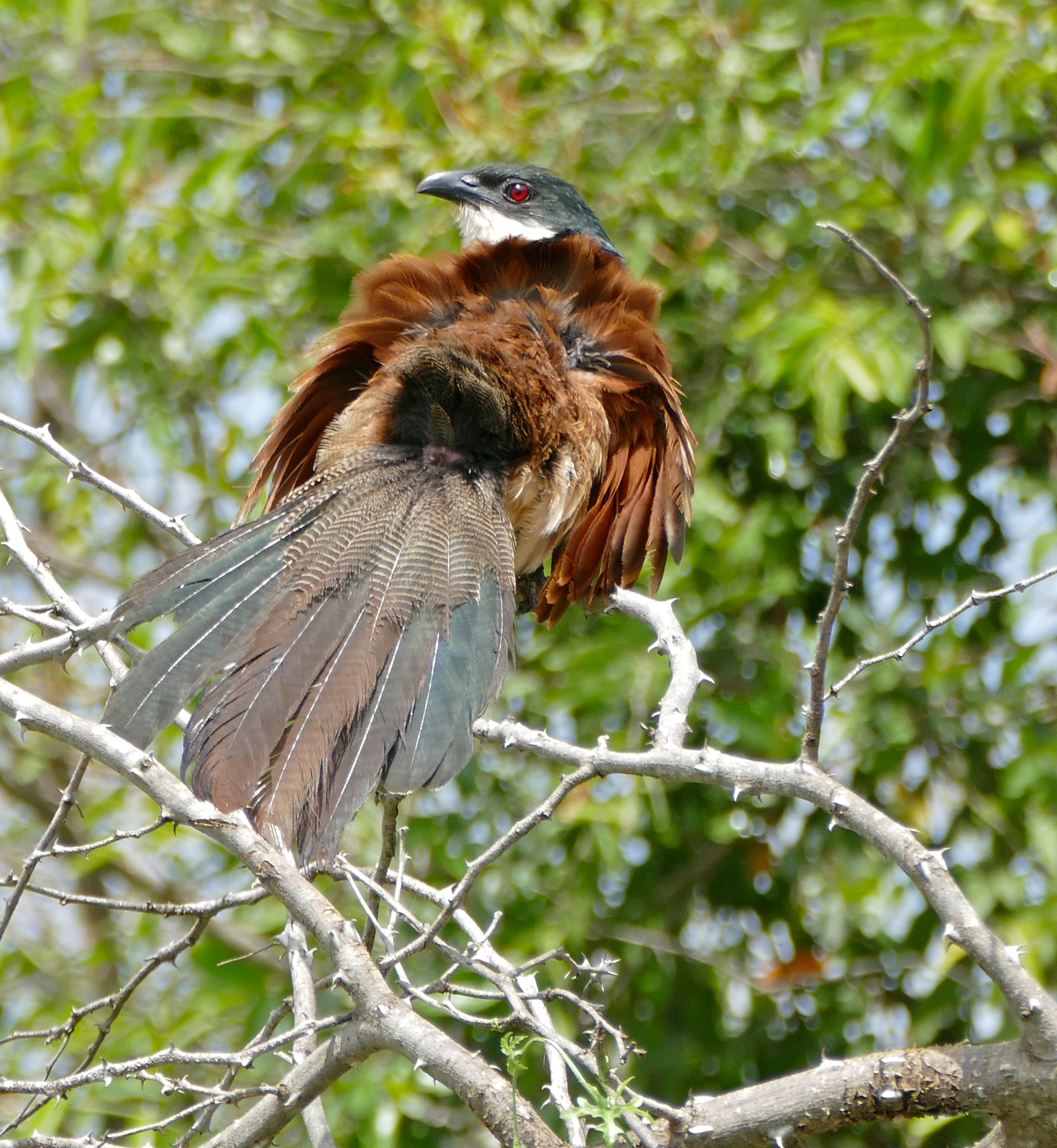
Sunning and preening with exposed uropygial gland

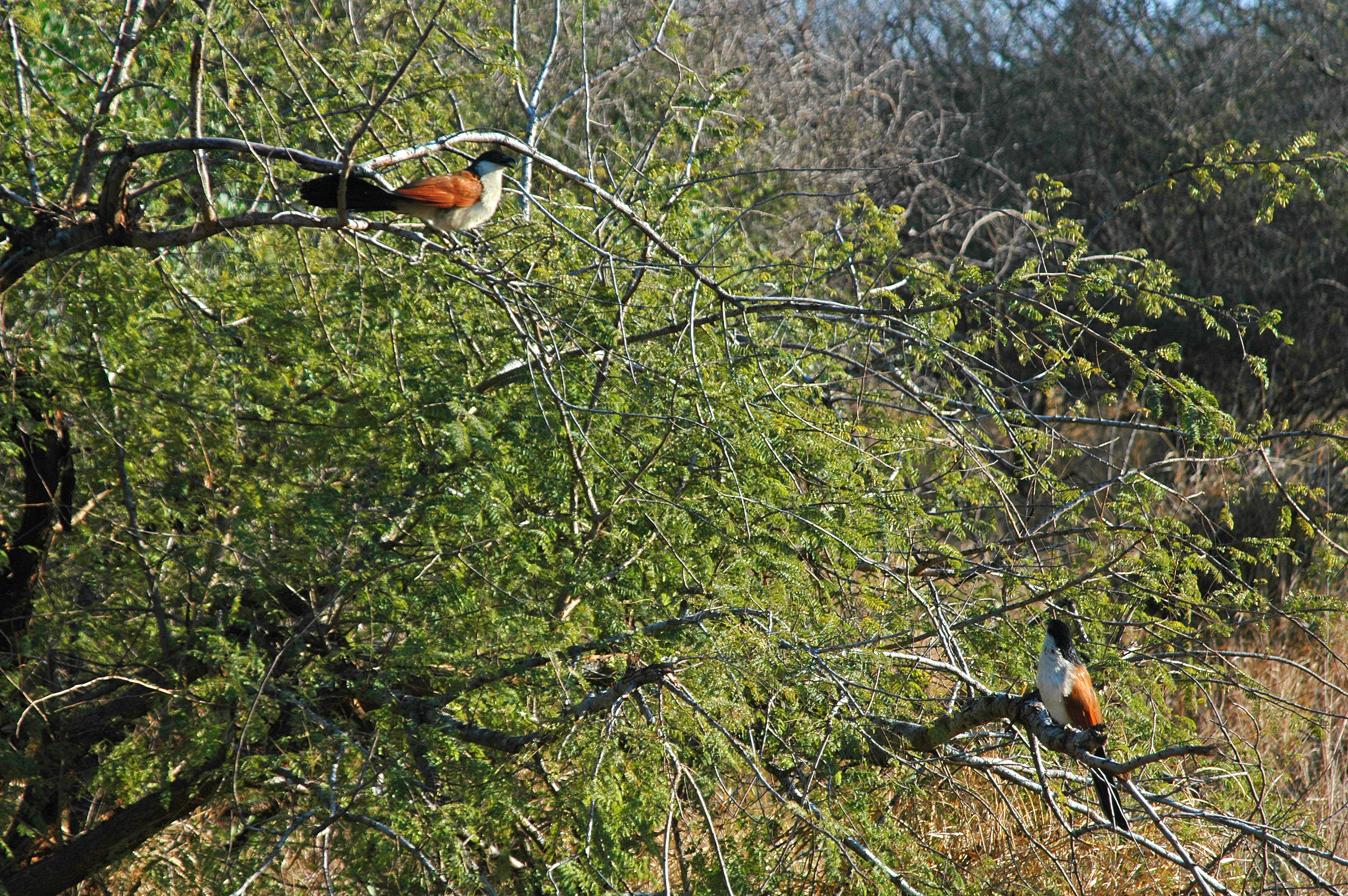
A pair in lowveld woodland in the Kruger Park

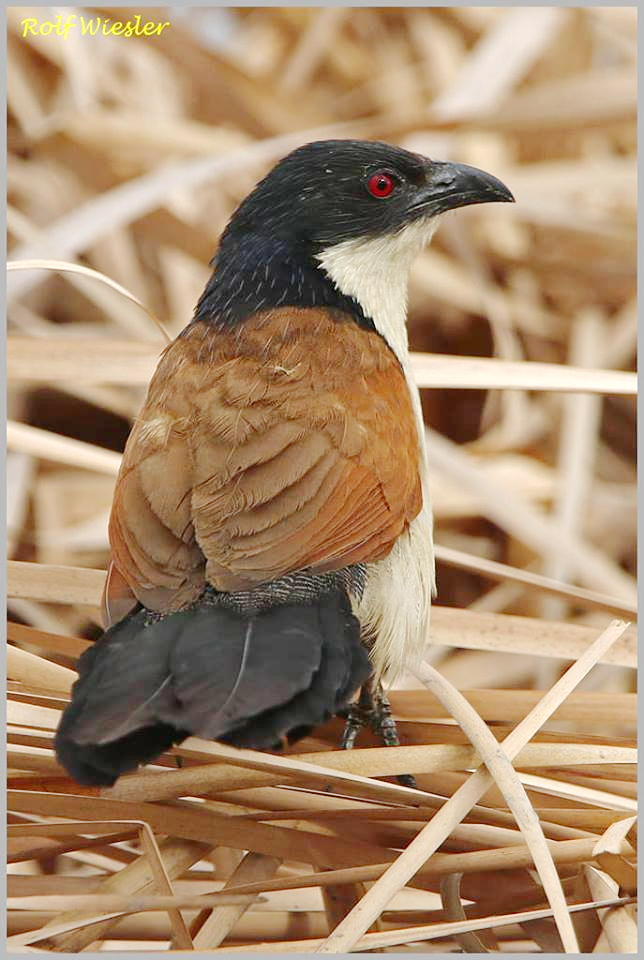
Navigating bulrush in an upland marsh
