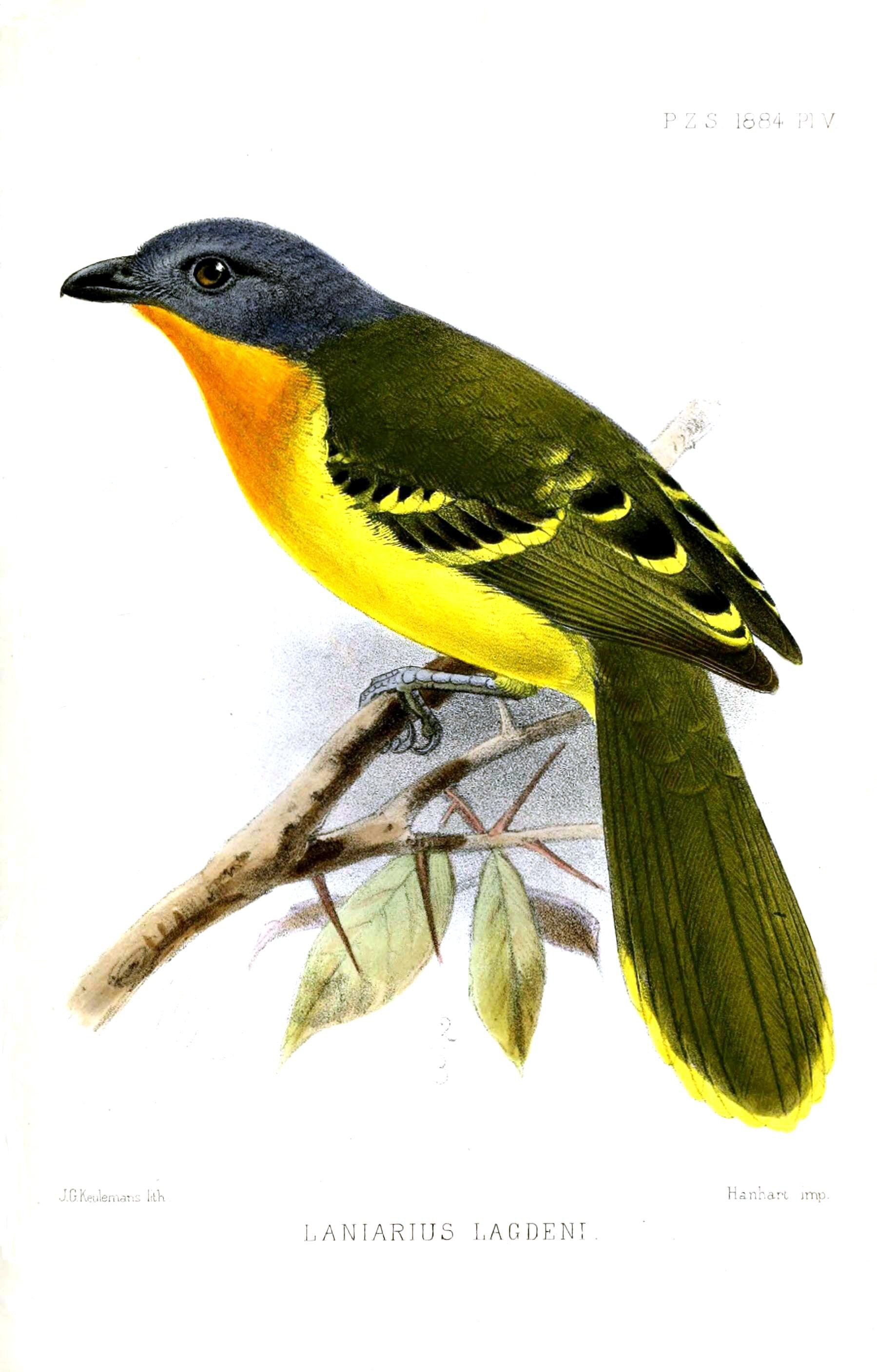
- Lithograph of adult by J.G. Keulemans

Conservation status
- Near Threatened (IUCN 3.1)

Scientific classification
- Kingdom: Animalia
- Phylum: Chordata
- Class: Aves
- Order: Passeriformes
- Family: Malaconotidae
- Genus: Malaconotus
- Species: M. lagdeni

Binomial name
- Malaconotus lagdeni (Sharpe, 1884)

= Lagden's bushshrike =

Species of bird

Lagden's bushshrike (Malaconotus lagdeni) is a bird species in the bushshrike family (Malaconotidae) native to Africa. It is a stocky bird with yellow or orange-yellow underparts, olive green upperparts, a grey head and heavy bill. Two subspecies are recognised.

== Taxonomy ==
Richard Bowdler Sharpe described the species in 1884 as Laniarius lagdeni, from a specimen collected in the vicinity of Kumasi in Ghana. However there were no further sightings of the species in this locale for the whole 20th century. He named it in honour of Sir Godfrey Yeatman Lagden, an English diplomat who served as Chief Clerk to the Secretary of the State of Transvaal and Secretary to Sir Owen Lanyon.

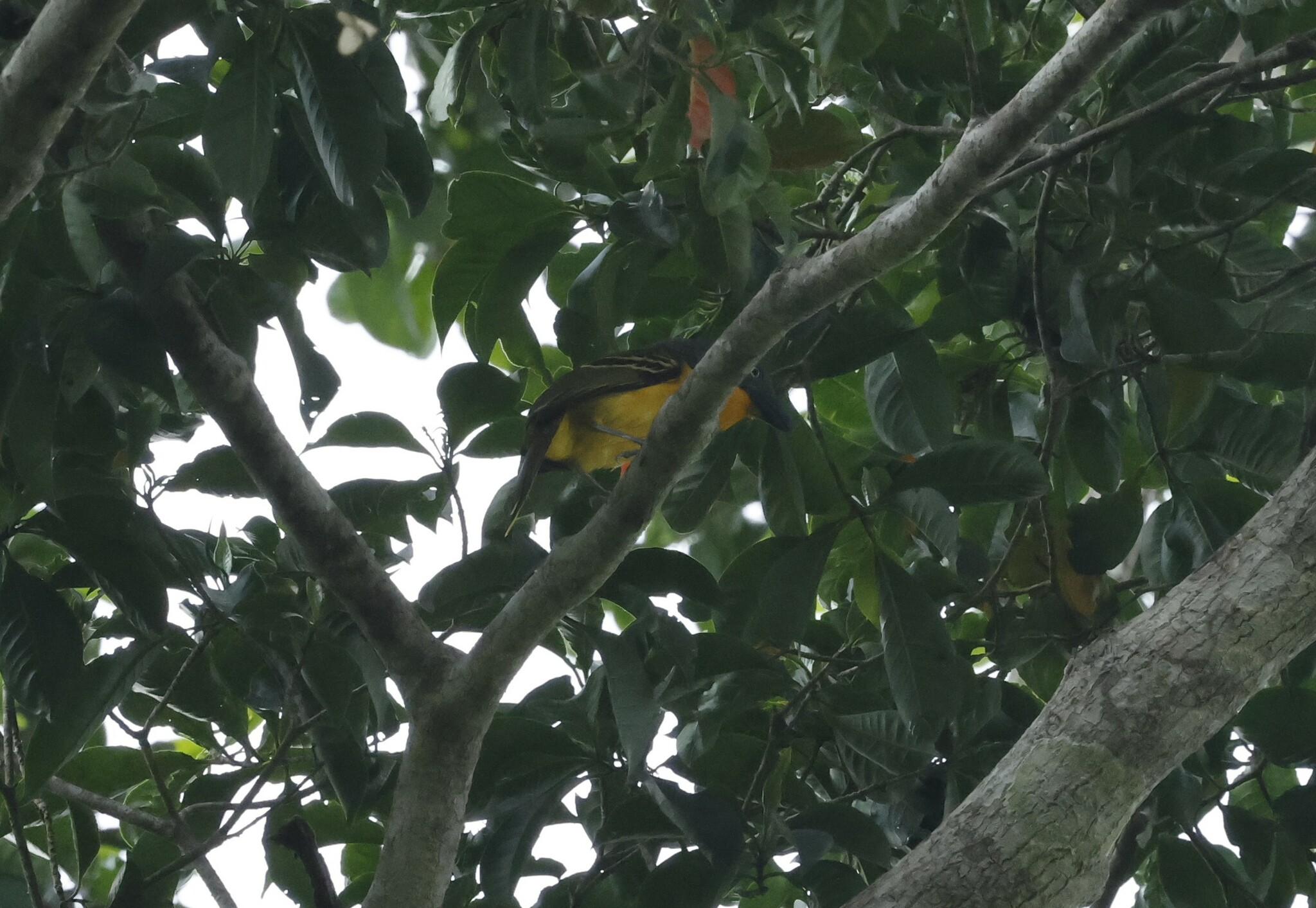
Live bird

There are two disjunct populations, classified as separate subspecies: Malaconotus lagdeni lagdeni, from eastern Sierra Leone, through Liberia, Ivory Coast and southern Ghana to western Togo, and Malaconotus lagdeni centralis, in the Albertine Rift montane forests. The western subspecies has more orange tinge on the underparts while the central African subspecies has none.

== Description ==
Lagden's bushshrike is a stocky bird some 23 cm long with a heavy black bill. The adult male and female are similar in plumage. The upper parts, including the wings and tail, are olive-green, and the head is dark grey. The underparts are yellow, sometimes tinged orange on the breast. The tail is edged with yellow. The legs are bluish grey.

Juveniles have duller plumage overall, with brownish upperparts yellow or white underparts, sometimes with some streaking, and a grey-brown bill.

It can be distinguished from the fiery-breasted bushshrike as the latter species has a much redder breast and light grey head.

The call has been described as a hoop hoop or a toot toot.... Others have said it is a "bell note" call, like the grey-headed bushshrike but at a higher pitch. This avian vocalization has been described using the odd consonant-filled word "Chrrrr". (Note: Which is also designated as a camel driver command, and the "courting call of a Gecko." Still other observers and ornithologists describe the song differently.) Recordings of the calls exist.

Loud flapping ("fripping") of wings commonly associated.

== Distribution and habitat ==
Its natural habitats are subtropical or tropical moist lowland forests in west Africa to an elevation of around 700 m, and subtropical or tropical moist montane forests in Rwanda, Uganda and the Democratic Republic of Congo at an elevation of 2100 to 2800 m. Classified in the IUCN Red List as Near Threatened, it is becoming rare due to habitat loss. One of the 1,487 bird species of eastern Africa, it is considered to be a "very rare mountain forest species". It is one of the 235 different species sighted at Kyabobo National Park.

== Feeding ==
Lagden's bushshrike hunts large insects, such as grasshoppers, and other arthropods, as well as small vertebrates, foraging in forest canopy 10–30 m (35–100 ft) above the ground.
