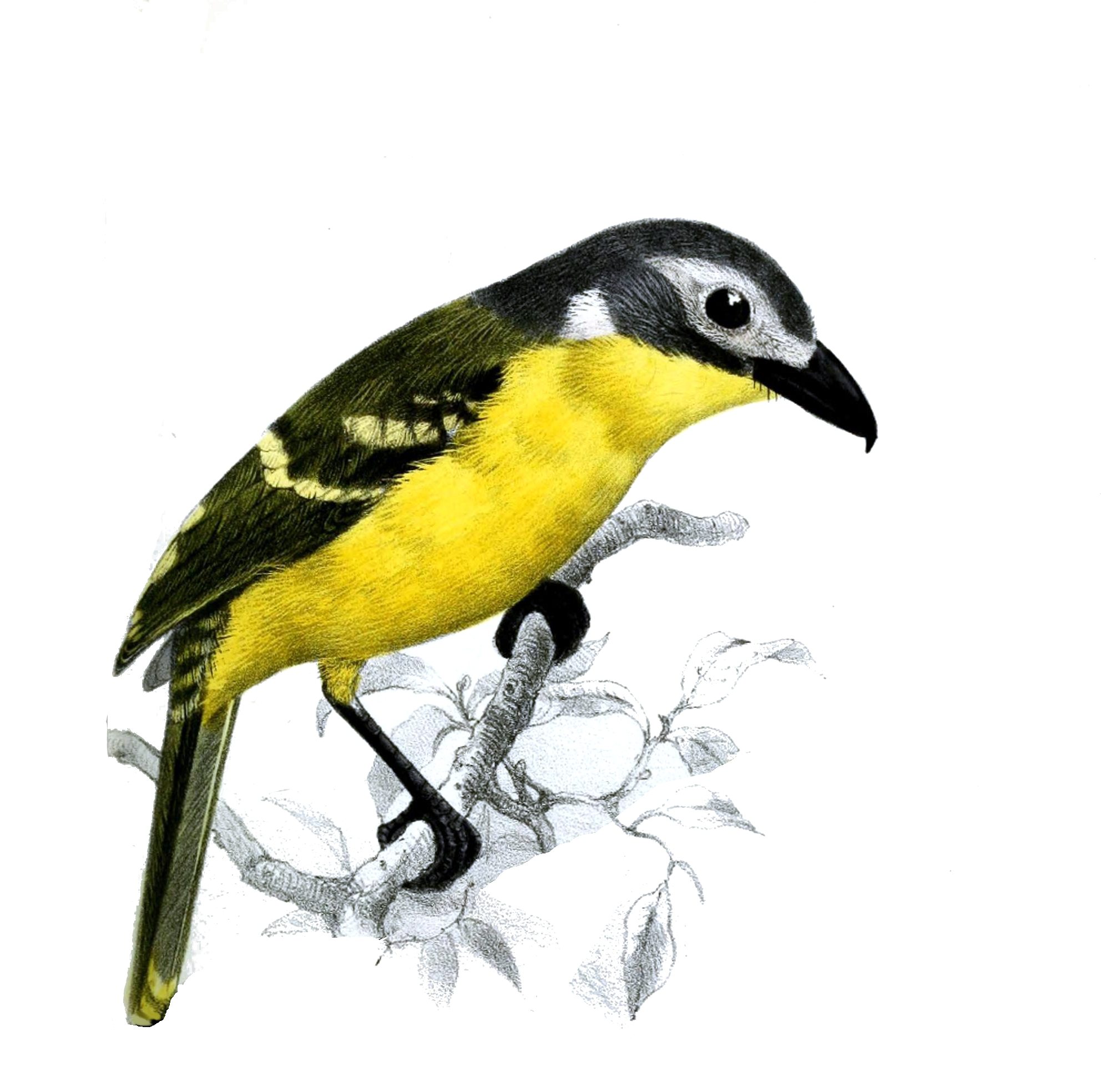
- Illustration by Joseph Smit

Conservation status
- Near Threatened (IUCN 3.1)

Scientific classification
- Kingdom: Animalia
- Phylum: Chordata
- Class: Aves
- Order: Passeriformes
- Family: Malaconotidae
- Genus: Malaconotus
- Species: M. monteiri

Binomial name
- Malaconotus monteiri (Sharpe, 1870)

Subspecies
- M. m. monteiri (Sharpe, 1870); M. m. perspicillatus (Reichenow, 1894)

Synonyms
- Laniarius monteiri Sharpe, 1870

= Monteiro's bushshrike =

Species of bird

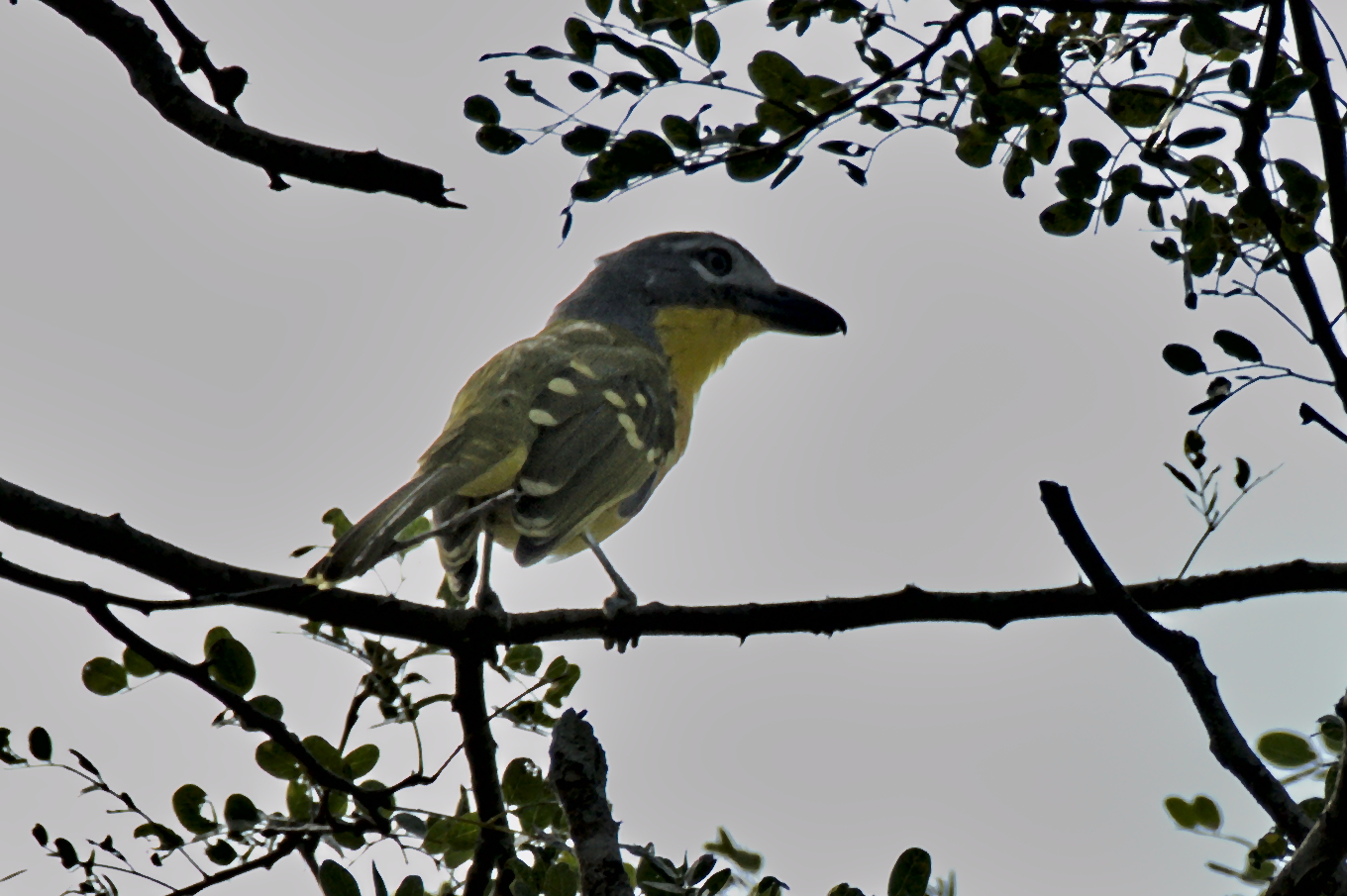
Monteiro's Bushshrike in Angola

Monteiro's bushshrike (Malaconotus monteiri) is a species of bird in the bush-shrike family (Malaconotidae).

== Taxonomy ==
Two described subspecies: nominate Malaconotus m. monteiri (Shape, 1870) described from Angola, and M. m. perspicillatus (Reichenow, 1894) known from only a single specimen in Cameroon. Subspecies perspicillatus differs from the nominate in having a larger bill and paler undersides.

Presumed to be closely related to other Malaconotus, and has been considered conspecific with both gray-headed bushshrike M. blanchoti and fiery-breasted bushshrike M. cruentus in the past. Cameroonian M. m. perspicillatus has also been theorized to be a color morph of the green-breasted bushshrike. The specific phylogenetic relationships of M. monteiri are, as of yet, unknown.

== Distribution and habitat ==
It is found in Angola and Cameroon, with a historical record from the Albertine Rift of eastern Democratic Republic of the Congo and a lost specimen from Kakamega Forest, Kenya.

This species' habitat is subtropical or tropical moist montane forests. In Angola, the nominate subspecies is found primarily along the Angolan Escarpment, with a distribution mirroring that of other Angolan endemic taxa.

This species is largely unknown outside of Angola. Cameroonian birds are described as the subspecies Malaconotus monteiri perspicillatus based on a single specimen from Mt. Cameroon in 1894. The subspecies of records in the Democratic Republic of the Congo and Kenya has not been confirmed, though the Congolese record has tentatively assigned to perspicillatus in the past. There are scattered sightings of reported individuals in other mountain ranges in western Cameroon (namely, Mt. Kupé and the nearby Bakossi Mountains), though these records are usually considered unconfirmed.

It is probably threatened by habitat loss like other birds in its range, but its actual status remains unknown due to its elusiveness.
