= Fülleborn's boubou =

Conservation status
- Least Concern (IUCN 3.1)

Scientific classification
- Kingdom: Animalia
- Phylum: Chordata
- Class: Aves
- Order: Passeriformes
- Family: Malaconotidae
- Genus: Laniarius
- Species: L. fuelleborni

Binomial name
- Laniarius fuelleborni (Reichenow, 1900)

Species of bird

Fülleborn's boubou (Laniarius fuelleborni) is a species of bird in the family Malaconotidae. It is found in Malawi, Tanzania, and Zambia, where its typical habitat is humid montane forest, dense undergrowth, secondary growth, forest edges and bamboo groves. The name of this bird commemorates the German physician Friedrich Fülleborn.

== Taxonomy ==
This bird has often been considered to be conspecific with the mountain sooty boubou (Laniarius poensis) complex (including the albertine sooty boubou (Laniarius holomelos) and Willard's sooty boubou (Laniarius willardi)), but Fülleborn's boubou possesses a different juvenile plumage of that complex, as well as differing morphologically and with respect to vocalizations. Recent genetic studies also indicate the two species are closely related but do not form a superspecies. Fülleborn's boubou is also similar to the slate-colored boubou (Laniarius funebris), but they occupy different ecological niches.

== Description ==
Fülleborn's boubou is a medium-sized boubou, growing to a length of 18 to 20 cm (7 to 8 in). The sexes are similar and the adult plumage is a bluish slate-grey with a blacker head, wings and tail, all of which are slightly glossed. The underparts are dark slatey-grey and the underwing is dark brown. The eye is brown or reddish-brown and the beak and legs are black. The upper parts of the juvenile are a brownish-black colour, faintly spotted with buff, and lacking gloss. The underparts are barred with buffy greyish-black. The adult plumage is gained at six or seven weeks. This boubou only takes to the wing occasionally and has a ponderous flight.

== Status ==
Fülleborn's boubou has a very wide range and is described as being a common species. The population seems steady and no particular threats have been identified so the International Union for Conservation of Nature has rated it as a "least-concern species".
