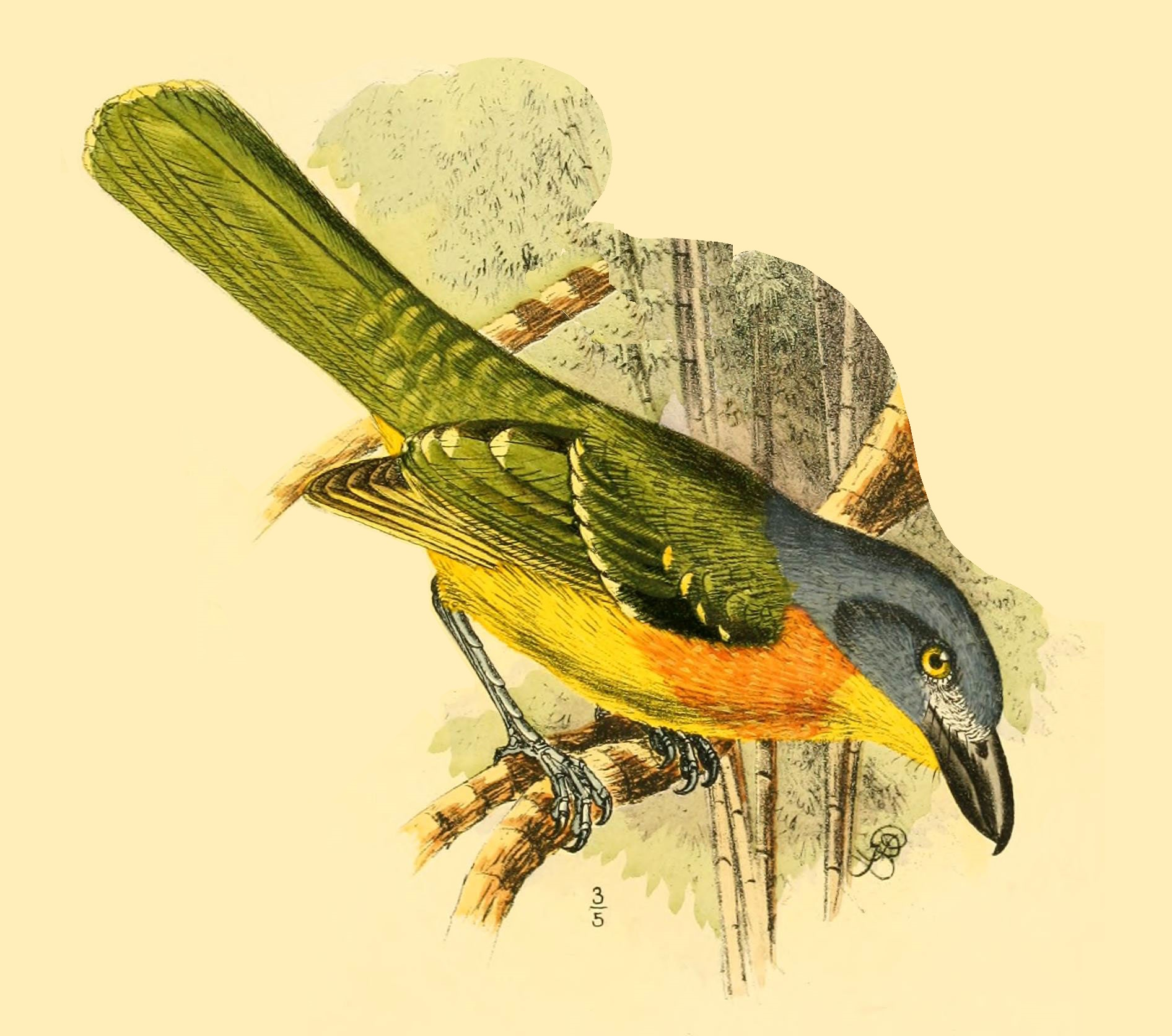
- Grey-headed bushshrike (Malaconotus blanchoti) in Reichenow (1902)

Scientific classification
- Kingdom: Animalia
- Phylum: Chordata
- Class: Aves
- Order: Passeriformes
- Family: Malaconotidae
- Genus: Malaconotus; Swainson, 1824

Type species
- Lanius olivaceus Vieillot, 1818

Species
- 6, and see text

= Malaconotus =

Genus of birds

Malaconotus is a genus of passerine birds in the bush-shrike family Malaconotidae, which is endemic to sub-Saharan Africa. Their Greek generic name suggests fluffy back and rump feathers.

== Description ==
All are large-bodied with robust legs and feet, and formidable shrike-like bills. As in other Malacotini, the upper mandible (maxilla) has a subterminal tooth, opposing a notch on the lower mandible. Both nasal and rictal bristles are present, and they are unique in their family in having syndactyl feet (3rd and 4th digits fused). They have 10 primaries and 12 rectrices like others of their family. The sexes are similar in appearance, but have dissimilar calls.

== Habits ==
They form monogamous pairs that live fairly sedentary in woodlands or tropical forest. They are very vocal, but their duetting is poorly developed compared to the related genus Telophorus. Their displays include bill-snapping, a habit shared with helmetshrikes (and some vangas of Madagascar), which however differ in their social foraging habits and cooperative breeding. Malaconotus bushshrikes breed solitarily, lay a small clutch (5 maximum) of elongate eggs, and their chicks are altricial.

== Systematics ==
They likely occupy a basal position in the family. About 60% of the species formerly placed here are now usually separated in Telophorus or Chlorophoneus. The old taxonomy is also often found though.

Malaconotus sensu stricto contains the following species:

Image	Scientific name	Common name	Distribution
	Malaconotus cruentus	Fiery-breasted bushshrike	equatorial Africa, from Sierra Leone to western Uganda
	Malaconotus lagdeni	Lagden's bushshrike	Rwanda, Uganda and the Democratic Republic of Congo
	Malaconotus gladiator	Green-breasted bushshrike	Cameroon and adjacent Nigeria
	Malaconotus blanchoti	Grey-headed bushshrike	Sub-Saharan Africa, although relatively absent in Central and Southern Africa
	Malaconotus monteiri	Monteiro's bushshrike	Angola and Cameroon
	Malaconotus alius	Uluguru bushshrike	Uluguru Mountains in Tanzania
