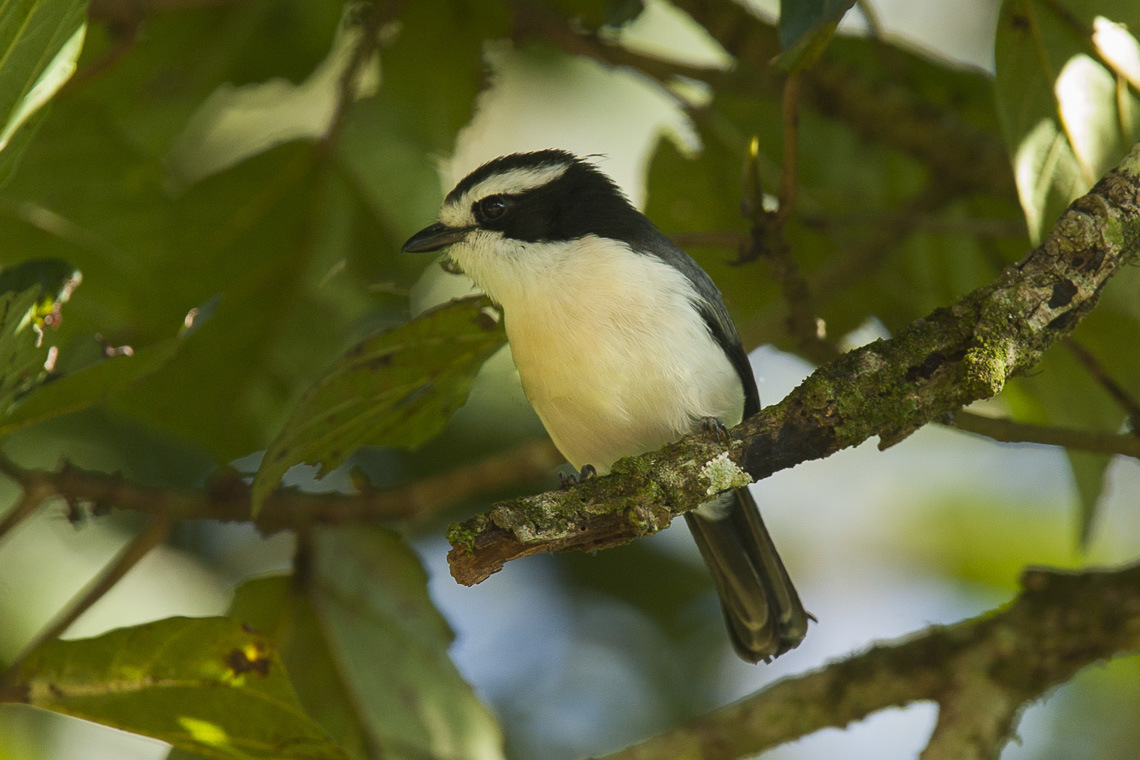

Conservation status
- Least Concern (IUCN 3.1)

Scientific classification
- Kingdom: Animalia
- Phylum: Chordata
- Class: Aves
- Order: Passeriformes
- Family: Malaconotidae
- Genus: Chlorophoneus
- Species: C. bocagei

Binomial name
- Chlorophoneus bocagei (Reichenow, 1894)

Synonyms
- Telophorus bocagei Malaconotus bocagei

= Bocage's bushshrike =

Species of bird

Bocage's bushshrike (Chlorophoneus bocagei), also known as the grey-green bushshrike, is a species of bird in the family Malaconotidae. It is scatteredly present throughout central Africa. Its natural habitats are subtropical or tropical dry forest and subtropical or tropical moist lowland forest.
