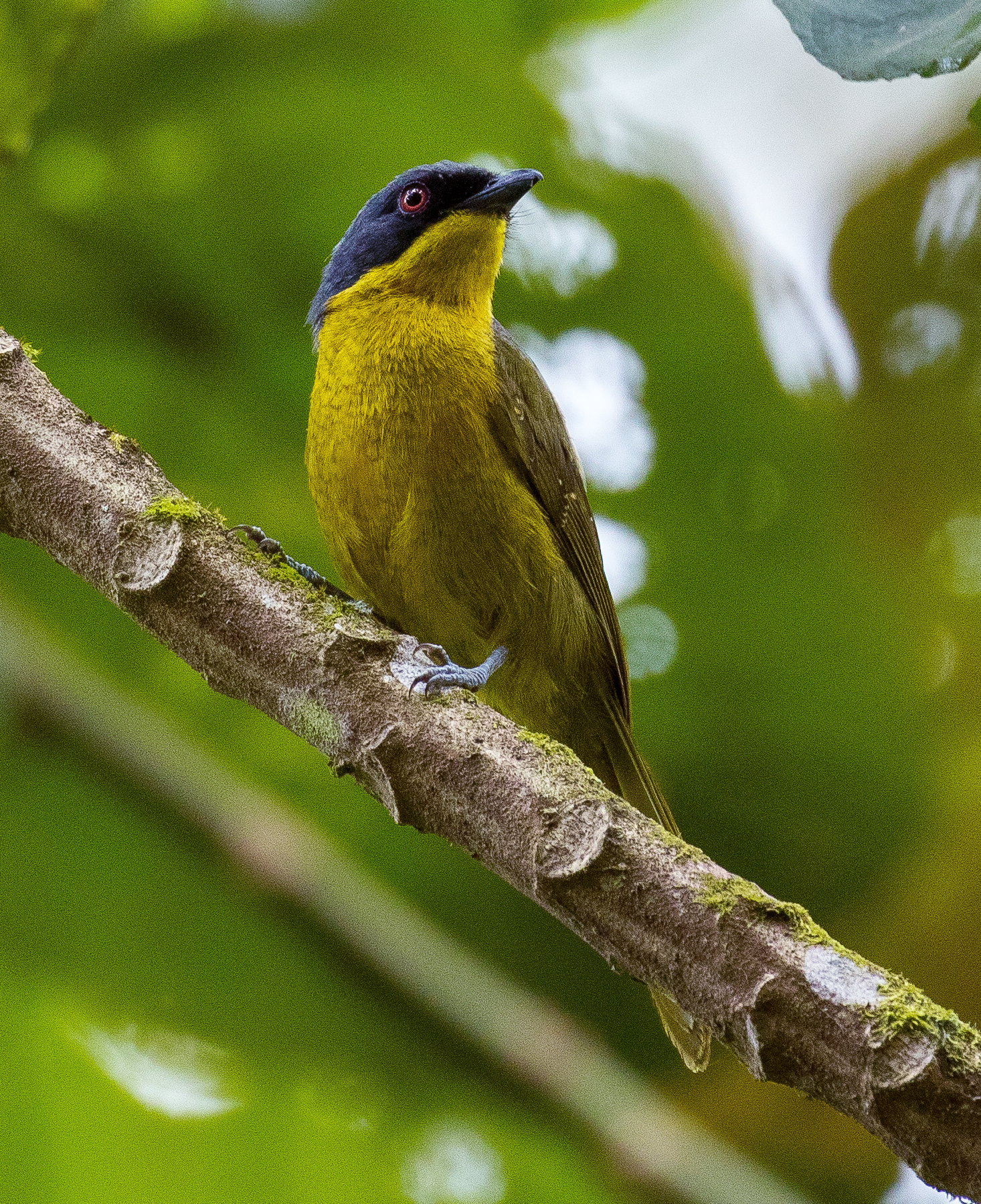

Conservation status
- Least Concern (IUCN 3.1)

Scientific classification
- Kingdom: Animalia
- Phylum: Chordata
- Class: Aves
- Order: Passeriformes
- Family: Malaconotidae
- Genus: Chlorophoneus
- Species: C. nigrifrons

Binomial name
- Chlorophoneus nigrifrons (Reichenow, 1896)

Synonyms
- Telophorus nigrifrons; Malaconotus nigrifrons

= Black-fronted bushshrike =

Species of bird

The black-fronted bushshrike (Chlorophoneus nigrifrons) is a passerine bird of the bushshrike family, Malaconotidae. It inhabits forests mainly in East Africa. It forms a superspecies with the many-colored bushshrike (C. multicolor) and the two are sometimes considered to be a single species.

== Description ==
The bird is 18–19 centimetres long. It is variable in appearance and has several different colour morphs. All birds have green upperparts, grey crown and upper back, yellow tip to the tail and dark bill and legs. The orange morph has a black mask and forehead and orange underparts, shading to yellow under the tail. The red morph is similar but redder on the throat and breast with yellow on the belly and undertail-coverts. The buff form has buff underparts and a pale throat. The black morph has an entirely black face, forehead, throat and breast and green belly and undertail-coverts. Females are duller than the males with less black on the forehead. Juvenile birds have buffish underparts with dark barring and yellow edges to the wing-feathers. The song includes repeated bell-like phrases. Pairs often duet together.

== Distribution and habitat ==
It has a patchy distribution and is restricted to montane forests in many areas. It forages in the canopy and middle levels of the forest and joins mixed-species feeding flocks outside the breeding season. There are three subspecies: C. n. nigrifrons occurs from central Kenya southwards through Tanzania to northern Malawi. C. n. manningi is found from the south-eastern part of the Democratic Republic of the Congo to northern Zambia. C. n. sandgroundi occurs in southern Malawi, Mozambique, eastern Zimbabwe and north-eastern South Africa.

== Ectoparasite ==
A quill mite, Neoaulonastus malaconotus, has been identified as an ectoparasite of the species. It belongs to the Syringophilinae, a mite subfamily known to infect several bushshrike species.
