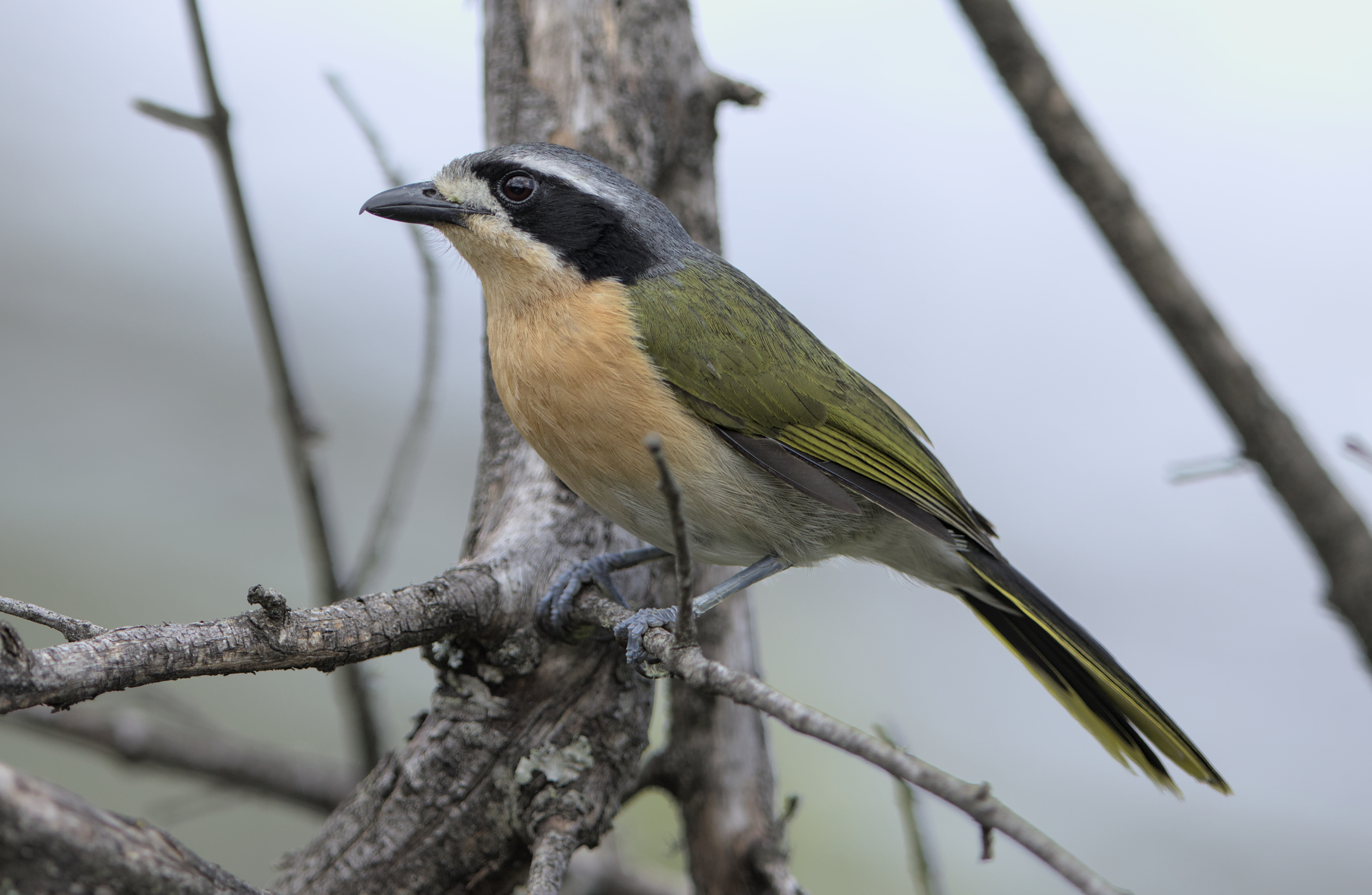
- Mariepskop slopes, Limpopo

Conservation status
- Least Concern (IUCN 3.1)

Scientific classification
- Kingdom: Animalia
- Phylum: Chordata
- Class: Aves
- Order: Passeriformes
- Family: Malaconotidae
- Genus: Chlorophoneus
- Species: C. olivaceus

Binomial name
- Chlorophoneus olivaceus (Shaw, 1809)

Synonyms
- Telophorus olivaceus Malaconotus olivaceus

= Olive bushshrike =

Species of bird

The olive bushshrike (Chlorophoneus olivaceus) is a species of bird in the family Malaconotidae. It is found in Malawi, Mozambique, South Africa, Eswatini, and Zimbabwe. Its natural habitats are subtropical or tropical dry forest, subtropical or tropical moist lowland forest, subtropical or tropical moist montane forest, and subtropical or tropical dry shrubland. It forages for insects in the forest canopy.
