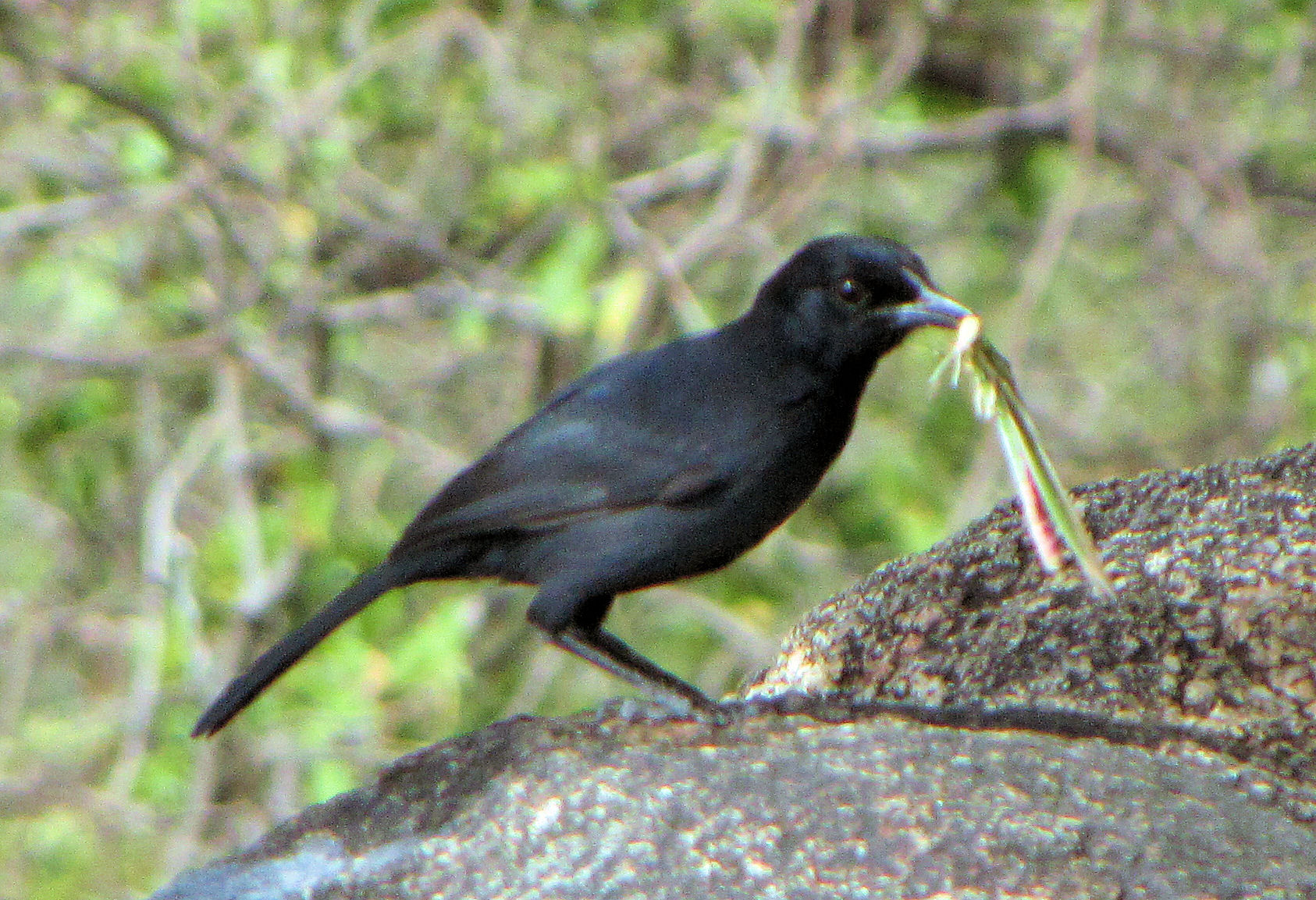
- Adult in Serengeti, Tanzania
- Duet recorded near Kitale, Kenya

Conservation status
- Least Concern (IUCN 3.1)

Scientific classification
- Kingdom: Animalia
- Phylum: Chordata
- Class: Aves
- Order: Passeriformes
- Family: Malaconotidae
- Genus: Laniarius
- Species: L. funebris

Binomial name
- Laniarius funebris (Hartlaub, 1863)

= Slate-colored boubou =

Species of bird

The slate-colored boubou or slate-coloured boubou (Laniarius funebris) is a species of bird in the family Malaconotidae. It is found in Ethiopia, Kenya, Rwanda, Somalia, South Sudan, Tanzania, and Uganda. Its natural habitats are subtropical or tropical dry forests, dry savanna, subtropical or tropical dry shrubland, and subtropical or tropical moist shrubland.

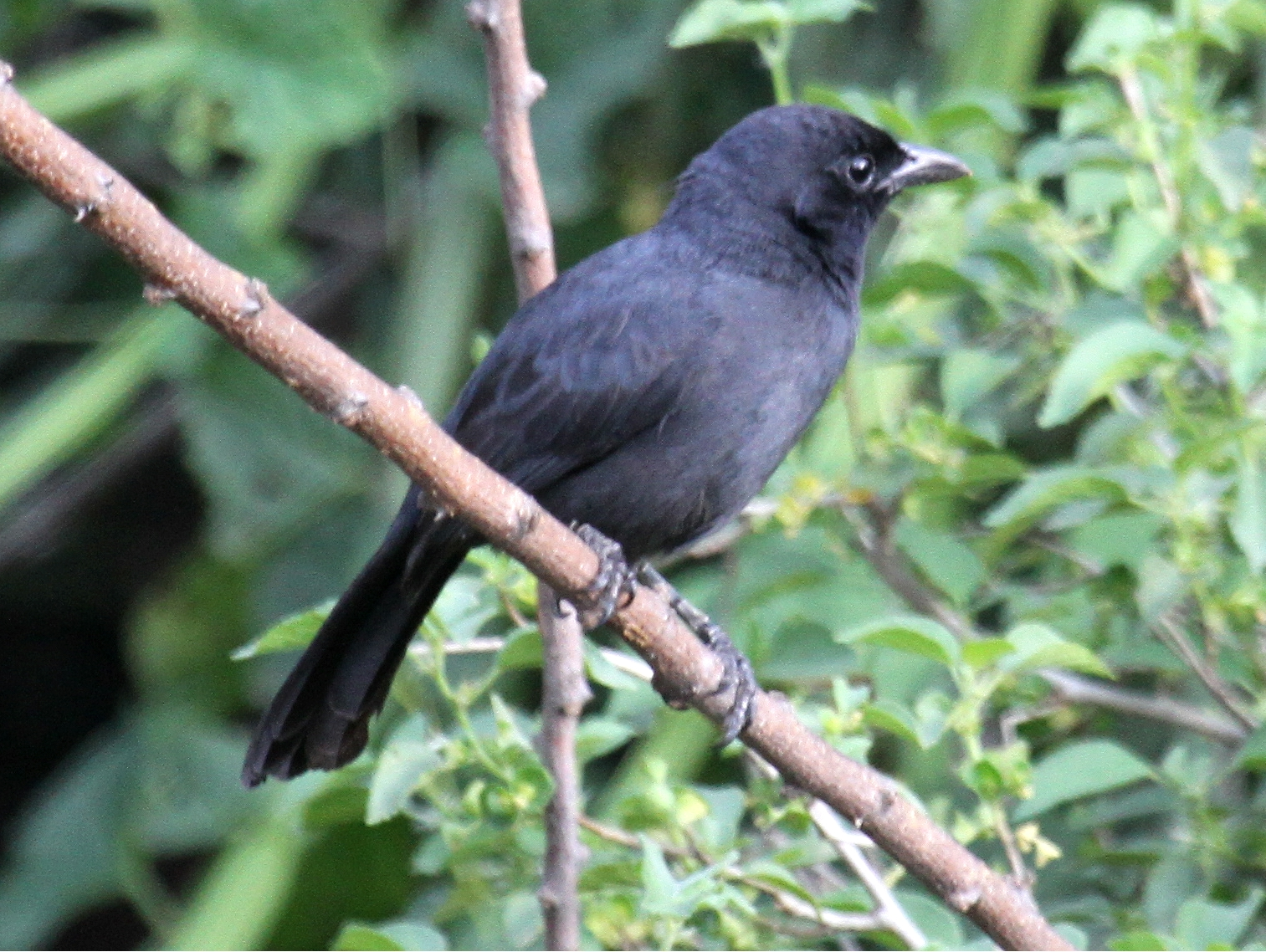
Lake Bogoria - Kenya

German naturalist Gustav Hartlaub described the slate-colored boubou in 1863. Two subspecies, funebris and degener are recognised. Within the genus Laniarius its position is unclear, but it does not appear to be closely related to the black-plumaged members of the genus such as Fuelleborn's boubou, Laniarius fuelleborni, with which some authorities had previously considered it conspecific.

The adult slate-colored boubou is 20 cm (8 in) long and wholly dark slate grey. The male and female are very similar. Immature birds have a plumage more barred with tawny brown and black.

The male's call repertoire includes a noisy shhhhh, or strong clicking and coco-weet, with a rising inflexion on the last syllable. The calls differ regionally across the species' range. Songs are frequently sung in a duet between the male and female of a mated pair. A 1983 study observed four types of songs sung by males in duets. Researchers concluded that one song type was for mating, two were used to indicate territory, and the final type may have been used to prevent the male boubou's mate from singing alone, which could attract other males. The frequencies with which the male boubou sang the territorial songs vary with the extent of threats from other boubous and with the level of cooperation between mates. A 1992 study of its calls found that a male's likelihood of singing a mating song was correlated with his mate's estradiol levels, rather than his own testosterone levels, suggesting that behavioral cues between a mating pair, rather than hormone levels, are most important in triggering mating songs.

The slate-colored boubou lays a clutch of 2–3 eggs in a nest in a shrub or tree around 1.5 m (5 ft) above the ground.
