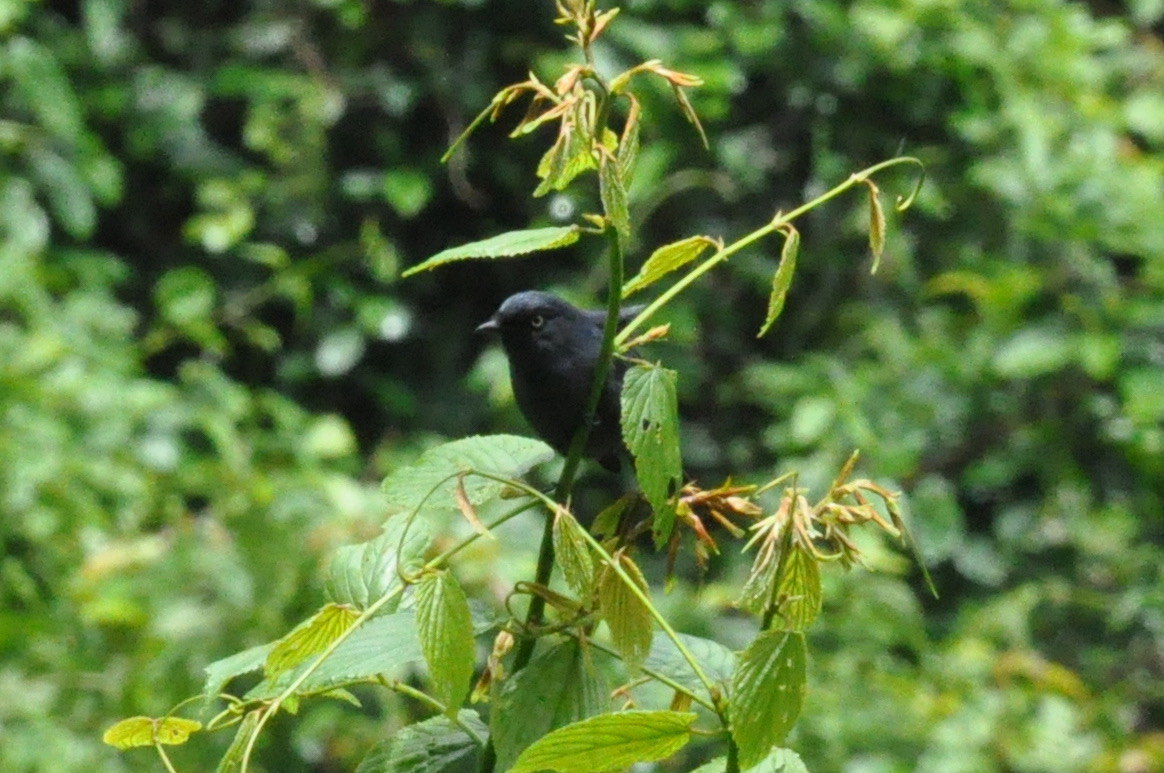

Scientific classification
- Kingdom: Animalia
- Phylum: Chordata
- Class: Aves
- Order: Passeriformes
- Family: Malaconotidae
- Genus: Laniarius
- Species: L. willardi

Binomial name
- Laniarius willardi Voelker & Gnoske, 2010

= Willard's sooty boubou =

Species of bird

Willard's sooty boubou (Laniarius willardi) is a species of bird in the family Malaconotidae, native to the Albertine Rift montane forests.

== Description ==
The species was first described in 2010, based on five specimens, all collected by the Field Museum of Natural History and originally identified as the Mountain sooty boubou (L. poensis). Four were collected in 1997 on a private banana plantation in southern Uganda, and the fifth was collected in Burundi in 1991.

The species' main distinct trait is its gray-to-blue-gray eye color, in comparison to the reddish-black to black eye color typically found in the Mountain sooty boubou. However, specimens collected as far back as 1910 were identified as having gray irises, but categorized as L. poensis. The species was also identified as being genetically diagnosable, differing 11.5% in uncorrected sequence divergence from the co-located Albertine sooty boubou. The species is named in honor of Field Museum of Natural History collections manager David Willard, with its common name also reflecting its uniform black plumage.

The species is also considered to be potentially threatened, due to occurring in a narrow elevational band between 1,200 and 2,000 meters that is heavily deforested for tea plantations.

== Bibliography ==
- Clements, J. F., T. S. Schulenberg, M. J. Iliff, B.L. Sullivan, C. L. Wood, and D. Roberson. 2011. The Clements checklist of birds of the world: Version 6.6.
- Voelker, Gary; Outlaw, Robert K; Reddy, Sushma; Tobler, Michael; Bates, John M; Hackett, Shannon J; Kahindo, Charles; Marks, Ben D; Kerbis Peterhams, Julian C; Gnoske, Thomas P (2010). "A New Species of Boubou (Malaconotidae: Laniarius) From The Albertine Rift". The Auk. 127 (3): 678–679. doi:10.1525/auk.2010.09014. S2CID 15031325.
