= Wildlife Conservation Society of Tanzania =

WCST Logo

The Wildlife Conservation Society of Tanzania (WCST) is an independent, membership and non-profit making organization founded in 1988 in Tanzania. Its main objective is to assist the government in conserving flora, fauna and the environment within Tanzania.

== See also ==
- Uluguru bushshrike
