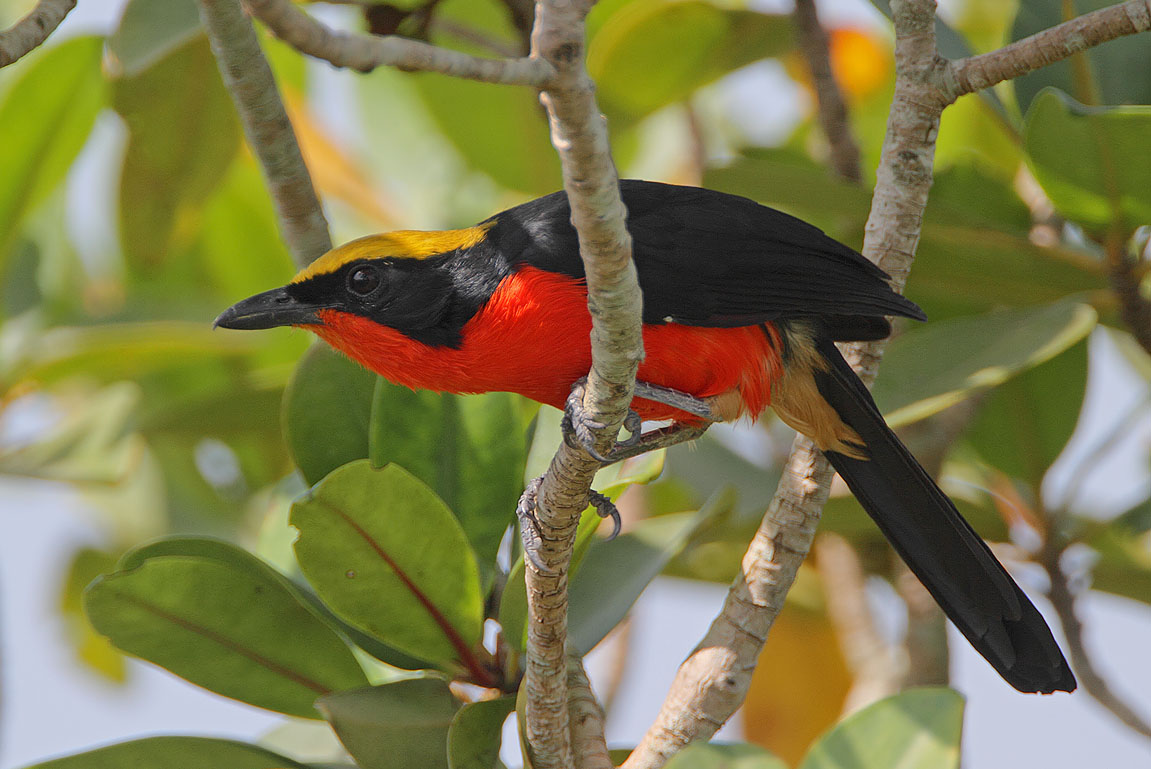
- A yellow-crowned gonolek (Laniarius barbarus) in Gambia

Scientific classification
- Kingdom: Animalia
- Phylum: Chordata
- Class: Aves
- Order: Passeriformes
- Superfamily: Malaconotoidea
- Family: Malaconotidae; Swainson, 1824

Genera
- Nilaus; Dryoscopus; Tchagra; Laniarius; Rhodophoneus; Chlorophoneus; Telophorus; Malaconotus

= Bushshrike =

Bushshrikes

Family of birds

The bushshrikes are small to medium-sized passerine birds. They were formerly classed with the true shrikes in the family Laniidae, but are now considered sufficiently distinctive to be separated from that group as the family Malaconotidae, a name that alludes to their fluffy back and rump feathers.

Like their other shrike-like relatives the helmetshrikes, the bushshrikes have arisen in Africa in relatively recent times. The family is largely endemic to sub-Saharan Africa but with one species (black-crowned tchagra) north of the Sahara in Morocco to Tunisia; they are completely absent from Madagascar, where the vangas are their closest relatives. They are found in scrub or open woodland, and less often in marshes, Afromontane or tropical forest. They are similar in habits to shrikes, hunting insects and other small prey from a perch on a bush. Although similar in build to the shrikes, these tend to be either colourful species or largely black; some species are quite secretive.

Some bushshrikes have flamboyant displays. The male puffbacks puff out the loose feathers on their rump and lower back, to look almost ball-like.

These are mainly insectivorous forest or scrub birds. Up to four eggs are laid in a cup nest in a tree.

== Taxonomy ==
Bock has posited that the family name Malaconotidae was first used by William Swainson in 1824; however, this is disputed by Storrs Olson, who reports that Swainson used the term Malaconoti as a non-defining plural, and placed the genus in the Thamnophilinae within the shrike family Laniidae. Peters regarded the group as a subfamily, Malaconotinae, of the shrikes. In 1971, the group was raised to family status, with their resemblance to typical shrikes considered to be more a result of convergent evolution.

Bushshrikes, helmetshrikes (Prionopidae), ioras (Aegithinidae), vangas (Vangidae) and the Australian butcherbirds, magpies and currawongs (Cracticidae) and woodswallows (Artamidae) are part of a large group of shrike-like birds distributed from Africa to Australia, which have been defined as the superfamily Malaconotoidea by Cacraft and colleagues in 2004. Previously, bushshrikes and helmetshrikes have been considered part of the Old World shrike family, Laniidae, based on shared characteristics including a hooked bill. However, analysis of behavioural and molecular characteristics places Malaconotidae closer to Platysteiridae and Vangidae, suggesting that the birds of the family Laniidae are only distant relatives.

An intron-comparison study by Fuchs et al. in 2004 provided strong support for the monophyly of the Malaconotidae, but the relationships between the genera of the family remain unclear. The genus Nilaus is morphologically more similar to Prionopidae than the rest of the bushshrike family is, but the results presented by Fuchs et al. place it within Malaconotidae. This placement is supported by DNA/DNA hybridisation data as well as studies of hind limb musculature. The genus Dryoscopus consists of six small species with similar colouring, which may be closely related to birds of the genus Tchagra. The genus Malaconotus consists of six species which were traditionally believed to be closely related to Telophorus due to similar coloration, but new analyses suggest a close relationship between Malaconotus and Dryoscopus and Tchagra. Strong evidence exists for the monophyly of the genus Laniarius, and Fuchs et al. suggest its closest relatives are the genera Telophorous and Rhodophoneus, but the exact relationships are unclear.

== Description ==
Bushshrikes are small to medium-sized passerines, with short, rounded wings and strong legs and feet. Plumage is typically black, grey, and brown, with some yellow and green. Some bushshrikes have red undersides or red throat-patches.

== Distribution and habitat ==
Bushshrikes typically inhabit forest margins or patches of bush in savannah. Some species have been known to inhabit coffee plantations, or subsist in sacred groves where riparian vegetation is informally protected from shifting cultivation.

== Behaviour ==
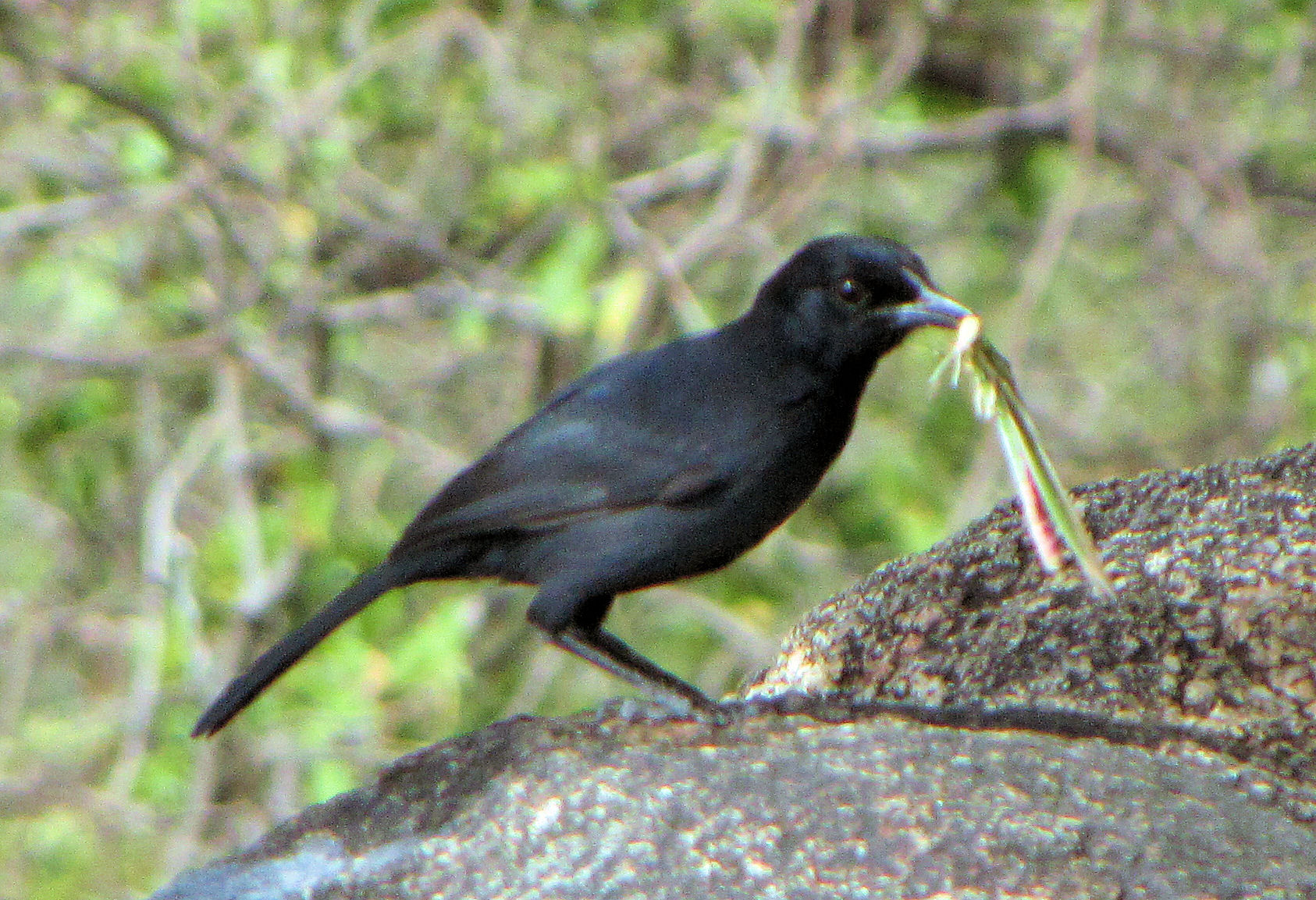
Laniarius funebris, the slate-coloured boubou, mates in monogamous pairs. It has been suggested that songs of this species are triggered more by behavioural cues than by hormone levels.

Bushshrike diets consist mainly of large insects, but occasionally may include wild fruits and berries and sometimes rodents. They catch their prey by gleaning among tree foliage. They also join mixed bird parties, loose foraging assemblages consisting mainly of passerine birds.

Their nests are generally small and neat, and they lay clutches of 2–3 eggs.

Bushshrikes have distinctive harsh or guttural calls, which may be sung as duets. Male and female birds are able to learn songs of similar complexity, and both sexes have a similarly sized repertoire. Songs may be sung to indicate territory or as part of courtship. A 1992 study of the calls of Laniarius funebris found that a male's likelihood of singing a mating song was correlated with his mate's estradiol levels, rather than his own testosterone levels, suggesting that behavioural cues between a mating pair, rather than hormone levels, are more important in triggering mating songs.

== List of species in taxonomic order ==
Image	Genus	Living species
	Nilaus Swainson, 1827	Brubru, Nilaus afer
	Dryoscopus F. Boie, 1826 – puffbacks	Northern puffback, Dryoscopus gambensis; Pringle's puffback, Dryoscopus pringlii; Black-backed puffback, Dryoscopus cubla; Red-eyed puffback, Dryoscopus senegalensis; Pink-footed puffback, Dryoscopus angolensis; Sabine's puffback, Dryoscopus sabini
	Bocagia Shelley, 1894	Marsh tchagra, Bocagia minuta
	Tchagra Lesson, 1831 – tchagras	Black-crowned tchagra, Tchagra senegalus; Brown-crowned tchagra, Tchagra australis; Three-streaked tchagra, Tchagra jamesi; Southern tchagra, Tchagra tchagra
	Laniarius Vieillot, 1816 – boubous and gonoleks	Red-naped bushshrike, Laniarius ruficeps; Lühder's bushshrike, Laniarius luehderi; Gabela bushshrike or Amboim bushshrike, Laniarius amboimensis; Braun's bushshrike, Laniarius brauni; Turati's boubou, Laniarius turatii; Ethiopian boubou, Laniarius aethiopicus; Tropical boubou, Laniarius major; East Coast boubou, Laniarius sublacteus; Black boubou, Laniarius nigerrimus; Swamp boubou, Laniarius bicolor; Southern boubou, Laniarius ferrugineus; Yellow-crowned gonolek, Laniarius barbarus; Black-headed gonolek, Laniarius erythrogaster; Crimson-breasted shrike, Laniarius atrococcineus; Papyrus gonolek, Laniarius mufumbiri; Yellow-breasted boubou, Laniarius atroflavus; Slate-coloured boubou, Laniarius funebris; Lowland sooty boubou, Laniarius leucorhynchus; Willard's sooty boubou, Laniarius willardi; Mountain sooty boubou, Laniarius poensis; Albertine sooty boubou, Laniarius holomelas; Fuelleborn's boubou, Laniarius fuelleborni
	Rhodophoneus Heuglin, 1871 – rosy-patched bushshrike	Rosy-patched bushshrike, Rhodophoneus cruentus
	Chlorophoneus Cabanis, 1850	Bocage's bushshrike, Chlorophoneus bocagei; Orange-breasted bushshrike, Chlorophoneus sulfureopectus; Olive bushshrike, Chlorophoneus olivaceus; Many-coloured bushshrike, Chlorophoneus multicolor; Black-fronted bushshrike, Chlorophoneus nigrifrons; Mount Kupe bushshrike, Chlorophoneus kupeensis
	Telophorus Swainson, 1832	Bokmakierie, Telophorus zeylonus; Gorgeous bushshrike, Telophorus viridis; Doherty's bushshrike, Telophorus dohertyi
	Malaconotus Swainson, 1824	Fiery-breasted bushshrike, Malaconotus cruentus; Lagden's bushshrike, Malaconotus lagdeni; Green-breasted bushshrike, Malaconotus gladiator; Grey-headed bushshrike, Malaconotus blanchoti; Monteiro's bushshrike, Malaconotus monteiri; Uluguru bushshrike, Malaconotus alius
