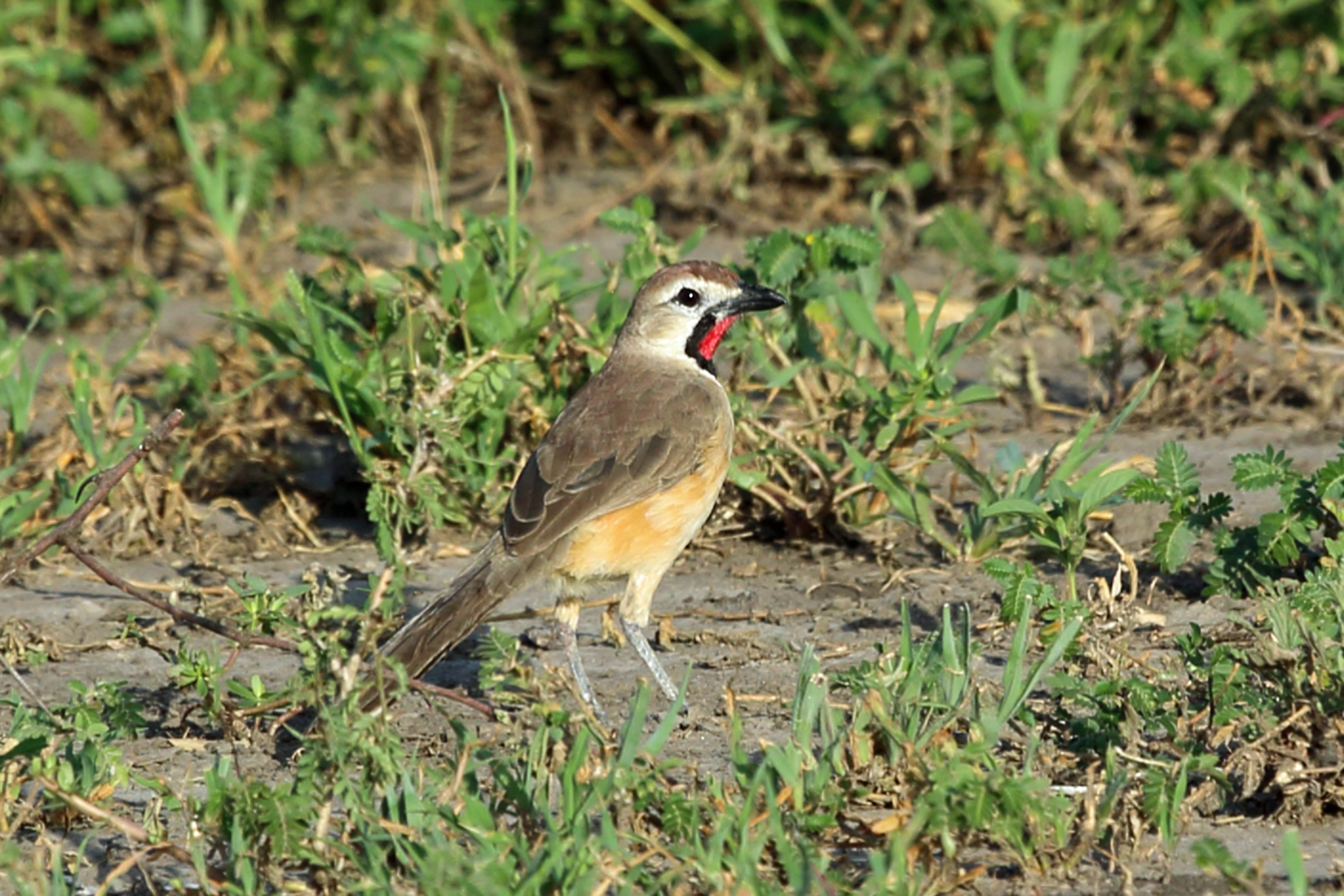
- Male in Tarangire, Tanzania

Conservation status
- Least Concern (IUCN 3.1)

Scientific classification
- Kingdom: Animalia
- Phylum: Chordata
- Class: Aves
- Order: Passeriformes
- Family: Malaconotidae
- Genus: Rhodophoneus von Heuglin, 1871
- Species: R. cruentus

Binomial name
- Rhodophoneus cruentus (Hemprich & Ehrenberg, 1828)

Synonyms
- Telophorus cruentus; Lanius cruentus (protonym)

Audio
- Song recorded in Kiboko, Kenya

= Rosy-patched bushshrike =

Species of bird

The rosy-patched bushshrike (Rhodophoneus cruentus) is a species of bird in the family Malaconotidae. It is the only species placed in the genus Rhodophoneus. It is found in Djibouti, Egypt, Eritrea, Ethiopia, Kenya, Somalia, Sudan, and Tanzania. Its natural habitat is subtropical or tropical dry shrubland.

== Taxonomy ==
The rosy-patched bushshrike was formally described in 1828 as Lanius cruentus by the German naturalists Wilhelm Hemprich and Christian Gottfried Ehrenberg based on specimens collected at Arkiko near Massawa in Eritrea. The specific epithet is Latin meaning "bloody" or "stained with blood". It is now the only species placed in the genus Rhodophoneus which was introduced in 1871 by the German explorer and ornithologist Theodor von Heuglin to accommodate a single species, the rosy-patched bushshrike. The genus name combines the Ancient Greek ῥοδον/rhodon meaning "rose" with φονευς/phoneus meaning "murderer".

Four subspecies are recognised:

- Rhodophoneus cruentus kordofanicus Sclater, WL & Mackworth-Praed, CW, 1918 – west-central Sudan
- Rhodophoneus cruentus cruentus (Hemprich, WF & Ehrenberg, CG, 1828) – northeastern Sudan, Eritrea, and northern Ethiopia
- Rhodophoneus cruentus hilgerti (Neumann, OR, 1903) – far southeastern South Sudan, southern and eastern Ethiopia, Djibouti, Somalia, and northern and eastern Kenya
- Rhodophoneus cruentus cathemagmenus (Reichenow, A, 1887) – southern Kenya (Tsavo and Lake Victoria) to northeastern Tanzania

== Gallery ==
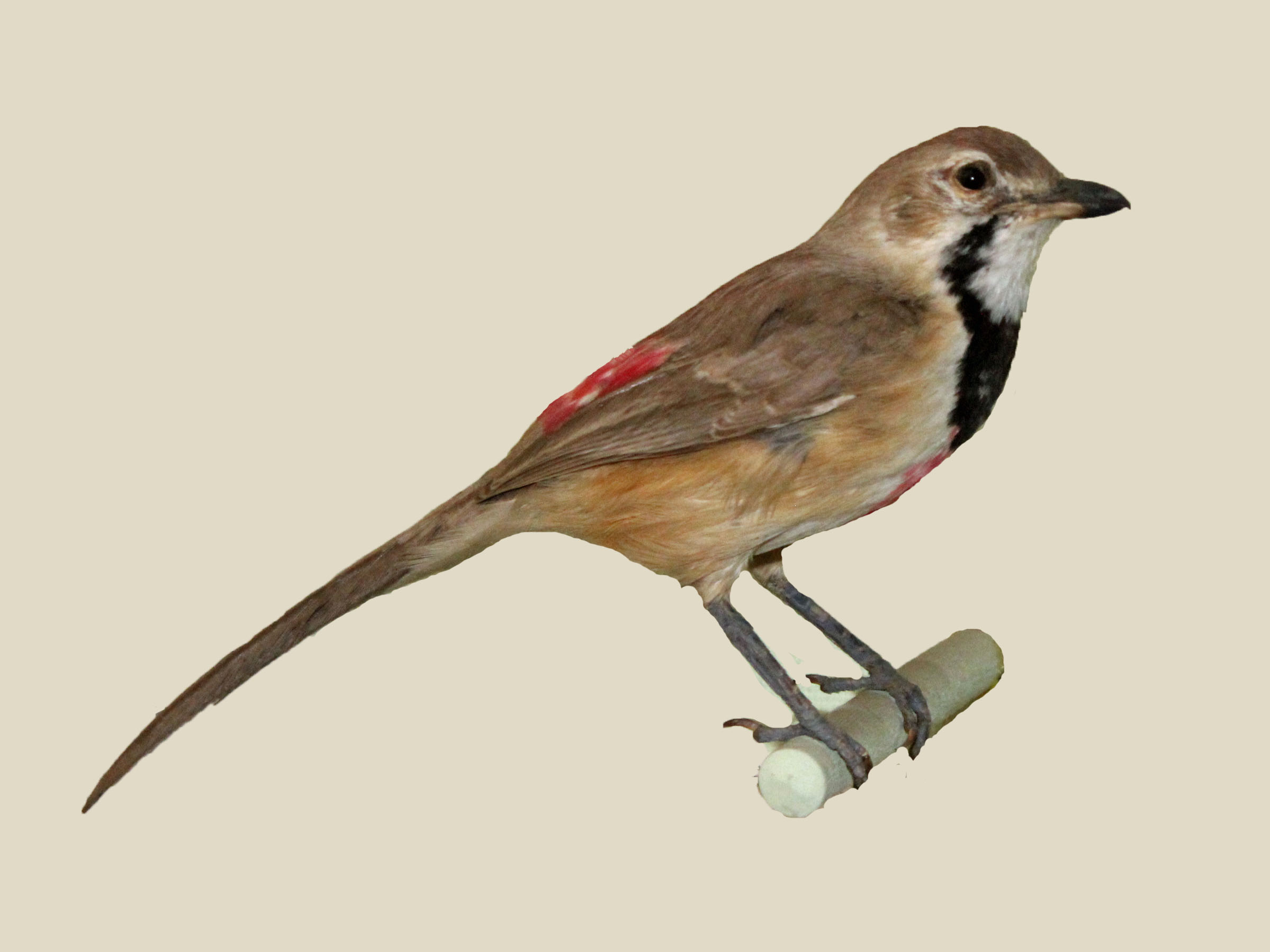
Rosy-patched shrike (female) specimen
Nairobi National Museum

Rosy-patched shrike from Tsavo National Park, Kenya, August 2016
