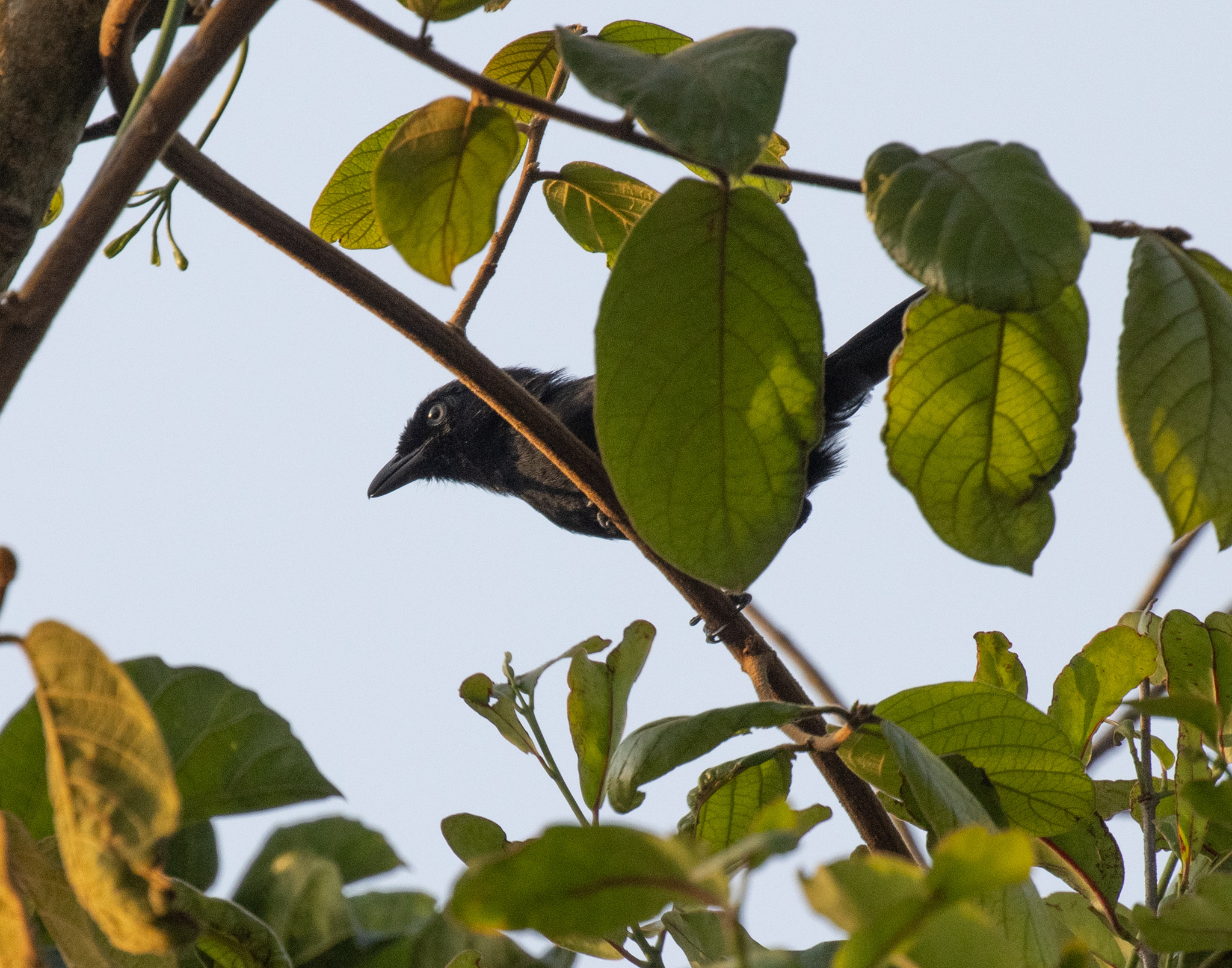

Conservation status
- Least Concern (IUCN 3.1)

Scientific classification
- Kingdom: Animalia
- Phylum: Chordata
- Class: Aves
- Order: Passeriformes
- Family: Malaconotidae
- Genus: Laniarius
- Species: L. poensis

Binomial name
- Laniarius poensis (Alexander, 1903)

Subspecies
- L. p. poensis (Alexander, 1903); L. p. camerunensis

= Mountain sooty boubou =

Species of bird

The mountain sooty boubou (Laniarius poensis), western boubou or mountain boubou, is a species of bird in the family Malaconotidae.

== Taxonomy ==
It was formerly considered conspecific with the Albertine sooty boubou (Laniarius holomelas), with Willard's sooty boubou (Laniarius willardi), and with Fülleborn's sooty boubou (Laniarius fuelleborni).

Two subspecies are currently recognized: nominate L. p. poensis, which is endemic to Bioko; and L. p. camerunensis which occurs on mainland Africa.

== Distribution and habitat ==
It is found in the Cameroon line from Bioko, Equatorial Guinea north to Mount Oku, Cameroon and the Obudu Plateau, Nigeria. In the Cameroon highlands, it is found in montane forests, usually above 600 m in elevation. On Mount Cameroon, this species can occur at extremely low elevations on the windward slopes near the coast, with records from as low as c. 520 m above sea level. On both Bioko and Mt. Cameroon, this taxon is restricted to montane forests.
