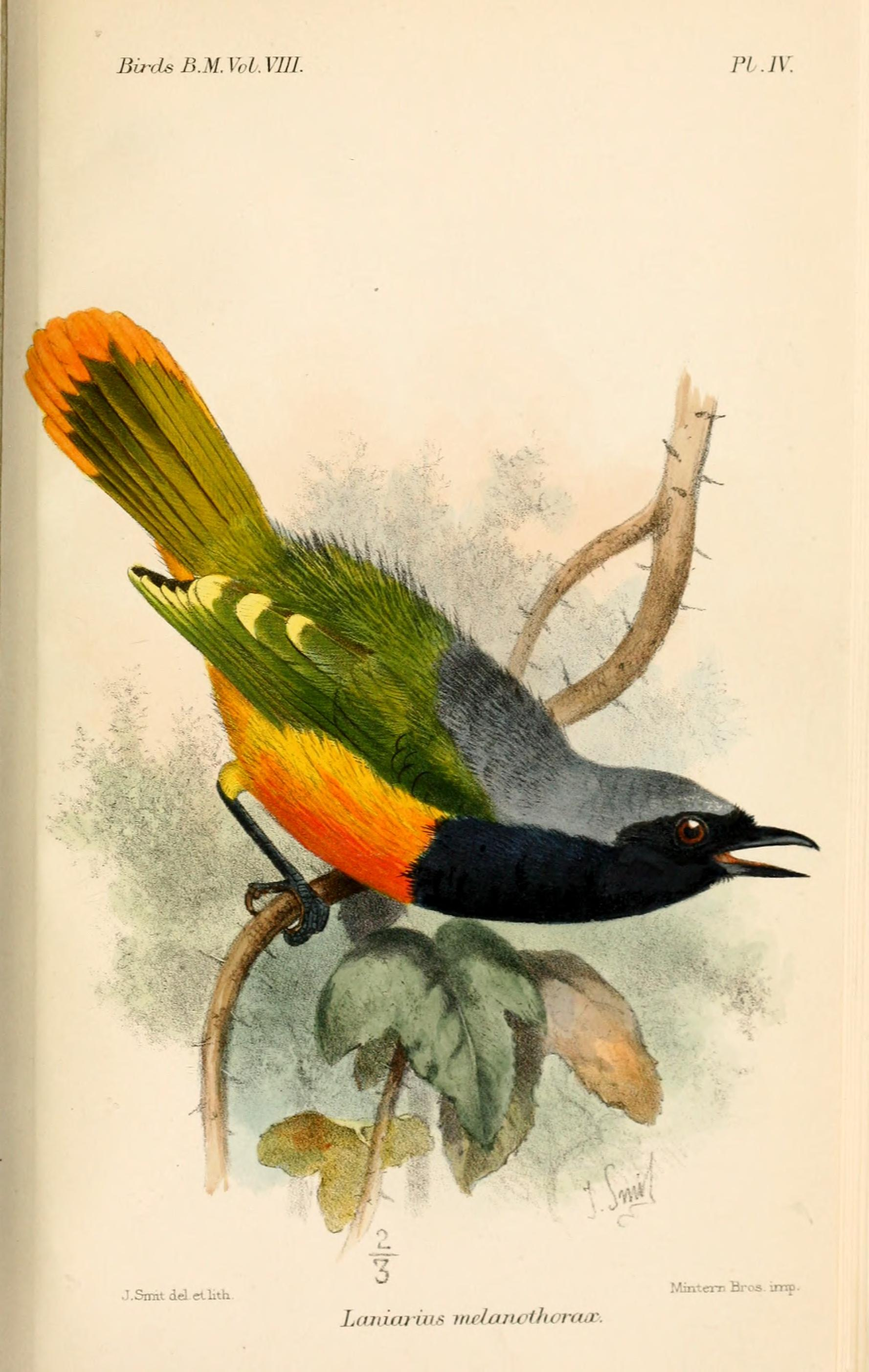

Conservation status
- Least Concern (IUCN 3.1)

Scientific classification
- Kingdom: Animalia
- Phylum: Chordata
- Class: Aves
- Order: Passeriformes
- Family: Malaconotidae
- Genus: Chlorophoneus
- Species: C. multicolor

Binomial name
- Chlorophoneus multicolor (Gray, 1845)

Synonyms
- Telophorus multicolor Malaconotus multicolor

= Many-colored bushshrike =

Species of bird

The many-colored bushshrike or many-coloured bushshrike (Chlorophoneus multicolor) is a species of bird in the bushshrike family, Malaconotidae.

The black-fronted bushshrike (C. nigrifrons) of southern and eastern Africa is sometimes included in this species.

It is sparsely present across the African tropical rainforest.

- C. m. multicolor (Gray, GR, 1845) — Sierra Leone to Cameroon;
- C. m. batesi Sharpe, 1908 — southern Cameroon to western Uganda and northwestern Angola;
- C. m. graueri (Hartert, 1908) — Albertine Rift montane forests.

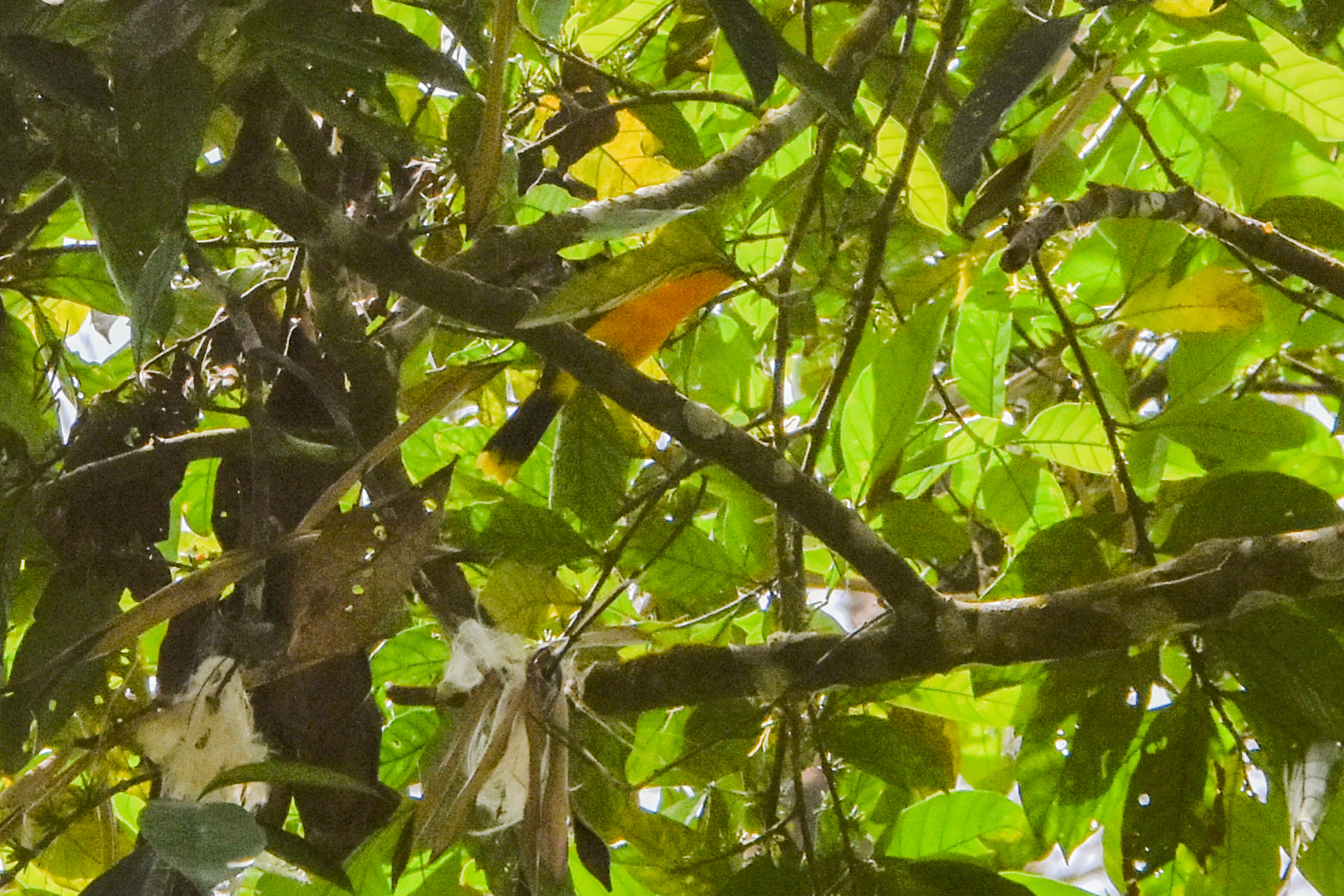
Live bird

Its natural habitats are subtropical or tropical dry forests, subtropical or tropical moist lowland forests, and subtropical or tropical moist montane forests.
