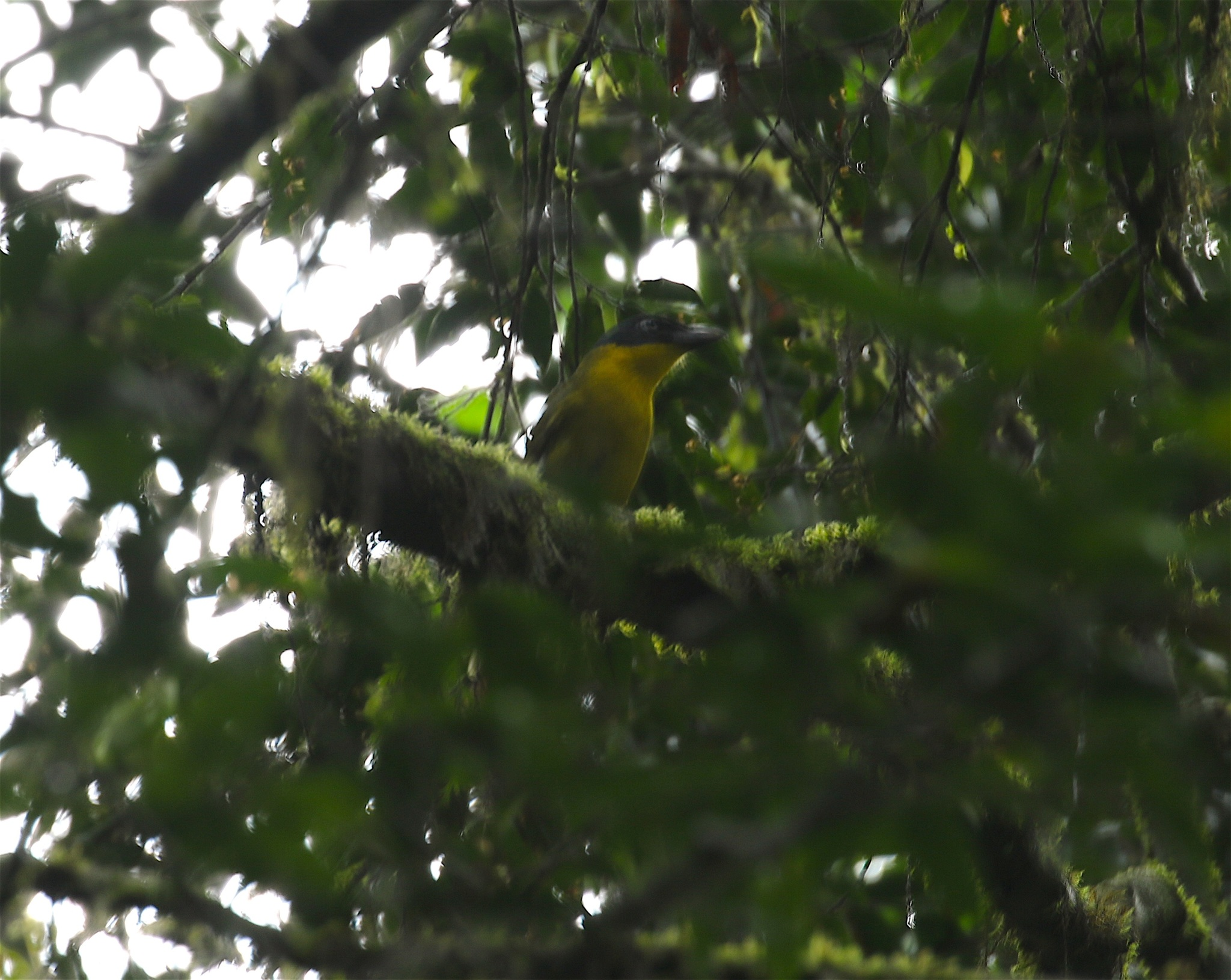

Conservation status
- Endangered (IUCN 3.1)

Scientific classification
- Kingdom: Animalia
- Phylum: Chordata
- Class: Aves
- Order: Passeriformes
- Family: Malaconotidae
- Genus: Malaconotus
- Species: M. alius

Binomial name
- Malaconotus alius Friedmann, 1927

= Uluguru bushshrike =

Species of bird

The Uluguru bushshrike (Malaconotus alius) is a species of rare bird occurring only in the Uluguru Mountains in Morogoro Region of Tanzania. It was discovered in 1926 and was known to be confined to a single site in the Uluguru North Forest Reserve of about 84 km^{2}. However, in March 2007, a team of Wildlife Conservation Society of Tanzania discovered its presence in the Uluguru South Forest Reserve in Morogoro Region. There are an estimated 1200 pairs remaining and the population trend is stable.

== See also ==
- Wildlife Conservation Society of Tanzania
