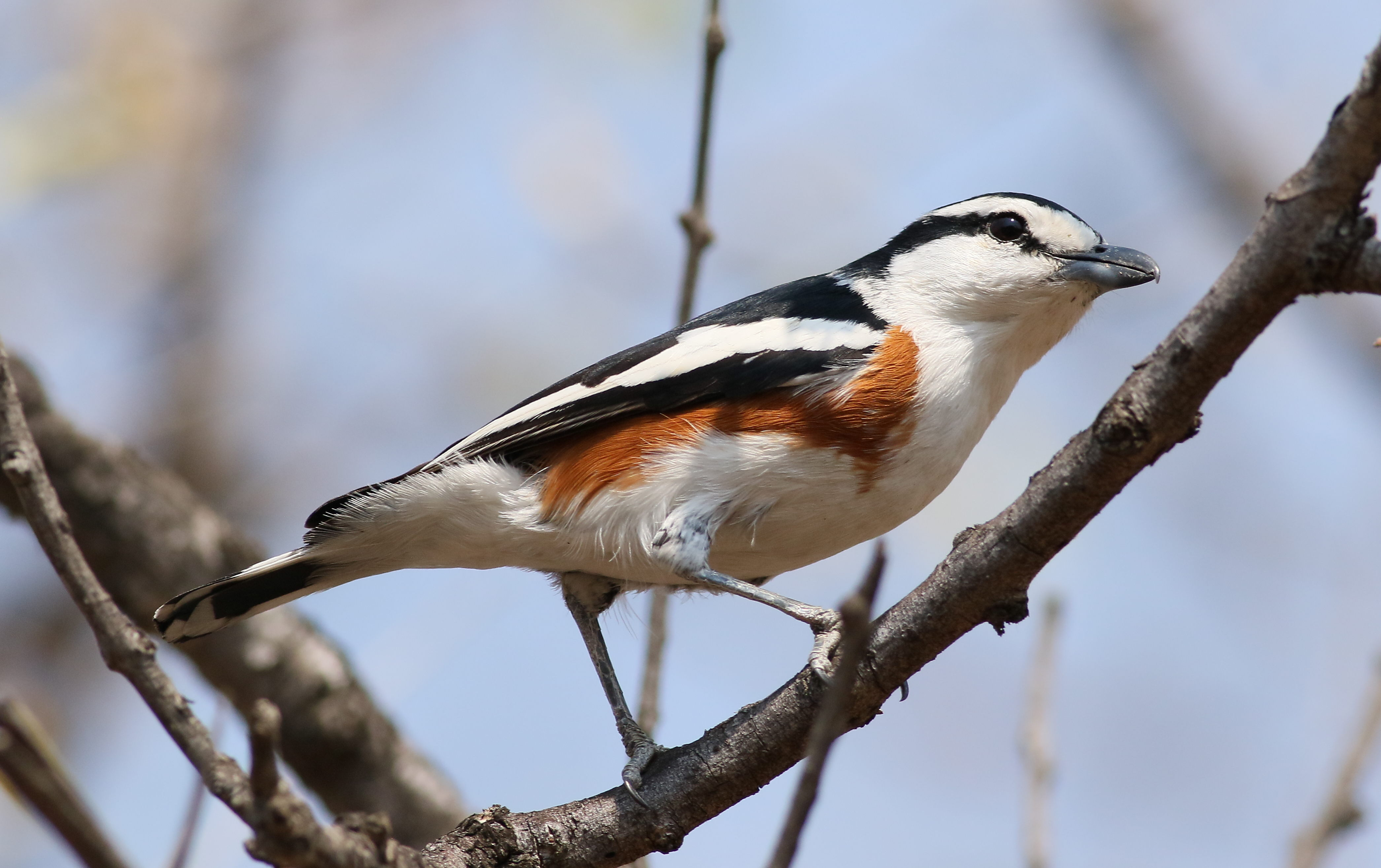
- A male bird of the southern race N. a. solivagus at Pilanesberg, South Africa

Conservation status
- Least Concern (IUCN 3.1)

Scientific classification
- Kingdom: Animalia
- Phylum: Chordata
- Class: Aves
- Order: Passeriformes
- Family: Malaconotidae
- Genus: Nilaus; Swainson, 1827
- Species: N. afer

Binomial name
- Nilaus afer (Latham, 1801)

Synonyms
- Nilaus capensis

Audio
- Song recorded in Kiboko, Kenya

= Brubru =

Species of bird

The brubru (Nilaus afer) is a species of bushshrike (family Malaconotidae) found in most of Sub-Saharan Africa. It is the only member of the genus Nilaus.

== Subspecies ==
Slight plumage and size variations reflect different ecological niches. Race N. a. hilgerti is currently synonymized with N. a. minor. The subspecies include:

- Nilaus afer afer — West Africa, with distinctive male plumage
- Nilaus afer massaicus — East Africa, including northeastern Uganda
- Nilaus afer minor — East Africa, including Kenya and Tanzania
- Nilaus afer nigritemporalis — Katanga region of DRC and adjacent Zambia
- Nilaus afer solivagus — Southern Africa and southern Zambia

== Distribution and habitat ==
Its habitat is dry open woodland, but varies geographically. The six northern races and the subspecies N. a. Brubru of southern Africa are found in acacia and broadleaved woodland, whereas the three subspecies in a belt from northeastern Angola and northern Namibia east to Tanzania and northern Mozambique occur in Brachystegia miombo woodland.

== Description ==
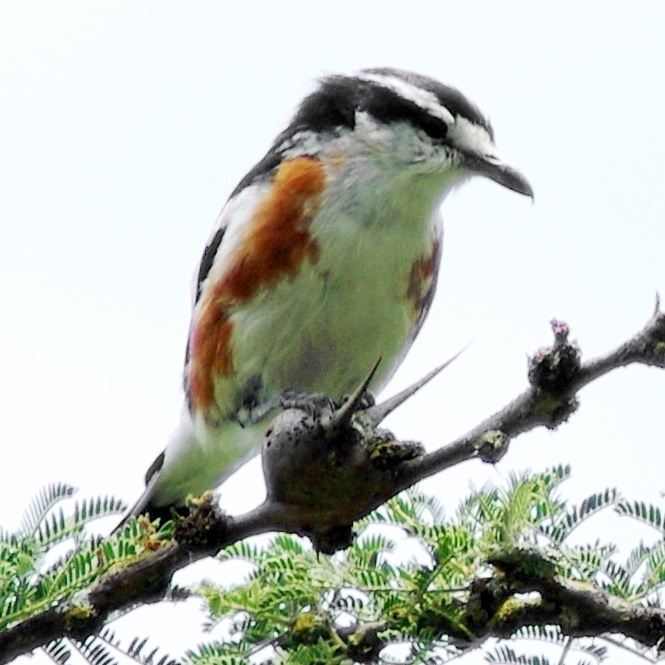
Male N. a. massaicus

The brubru is a small passerine, 12–15 cm long. The adult male of the nominate subspecies, N. a. afer, has a black crown, white supercilium and forehead, and black eyestripe. The back is black with a tawny strip, the rump is mottled black, and the tail is black with white tips and edges to the outer feathers. The wings are black with a buff shoulder stripe. The underparts are white with rufous flanks.

The female is duller and browner, with some streaking on the underparts and less rufous on the flanks. The juvenile is mottled brown, buff and white above, with buff edgings to the wing and tail feathers. Its underparts are whitish with brown barring.

The male of the most distinctive of the other subspecies, N. a. nigritemporalis, occurring in the central belt across Africa, has no supercilium and a white, not buff, shoulder patch. Other subspecies differ in the extent of the supercilium and rufous flanks, and the shade and degree of streaking of the underparts.

The song is a duet. The male gives a soft prrrrruuu call, often answered by the female's eeeu.

== Behaviour ==
The brubru is usually solitary or found in pairs; it is a restless but unobtrusive arboreal species which hunts insects in the canopy. Its need for large trees in which to feed means that it has an unusually large territory for a bird of its size, typically 35 hectares. Outside the breeding season, when insect prey is scarcer, it will join mixed-species feeding flocks.

== Breeding ==
The flimsy cup nest is constructed from twigs, grass and spider webs in a tree fork, and decorated with lichens. It is very well camouflaged. The female normally lays two eggs, which are off-white, greenish or greyish blotched with grey or brown. Both sexes incubate for about 19 days to hatching. The chicks fledge in another 22 days but are dependent for about eight weeks.

This species often destroys its own nests, especially when disturbed.

== Parasites ==
Two quill mites, Neoaulonastus malaconotus and Syringophiloidus nkaii, have been identified as ectoparasites of the brubru. They belong to the Syringophilinae, which are known to infect several bushshrike species.
