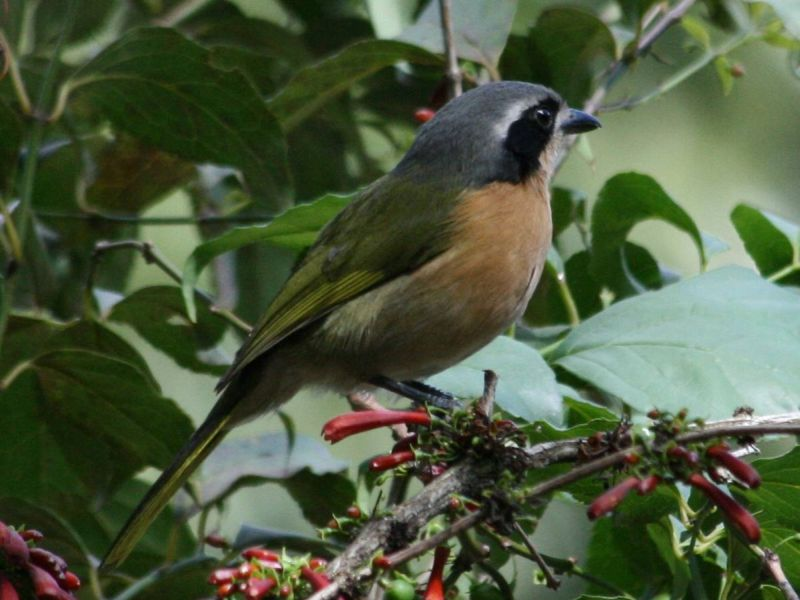
- Olive bushshrike (Chlorophoneus olivaceus)

Scientific classification
- Kingdom: Animalia
- Phylum: Chordata
- Class: Aves
- Order: Passeriformes
- Family: Malaconotidae
- Genus: Chlorophoneus; Cabanis, 1851

Type species
- Lanius rubiginosus Sundevall, 1850

= Chlorophoneus =

Genus of birds

Chlorophoneus is a genus of bird in the bushshrike family, Malaconotidae.

== Extant Species ==
It contains the following species:

Image	Scientific name	Common name	Distribution
	Chlorophoneus bocagei	Bocage's bushshrike	Angola, Cameroon, Central African Republic, Republic of the Congo, Democratic Republic of the Congo, Equatorial Guinea, Gabon, Kenya, Rwanda, and Uganda.
	Chlorophoneus sulfureopectus	Orange-breasted bushshrike	Sub-Saharan Africa (relatively absent from most of Central, Southern and the Horn of Africa)
	Chlorophoneus olivaceus	Olive bushshrike	Malawi, Mozambique, South Africa, Swaziland, and Zimbabwe.
	Chlorophoneus multicolor	Many-colored bushshrike	West Africa and also in western, northern parts of Central Africa and the eastern Congo Basin.
	Chlorophoneus nigrifrons	Black-fronted bushshrike	central Kenya southwards through Tanzania to northern Malawi, southern Malawi, Mozambique, eastern Zimbabwe and north-eastern South Africa.
	Chlorophoneus kupeensis	Mount Kupe bushshrike	Cameroon
