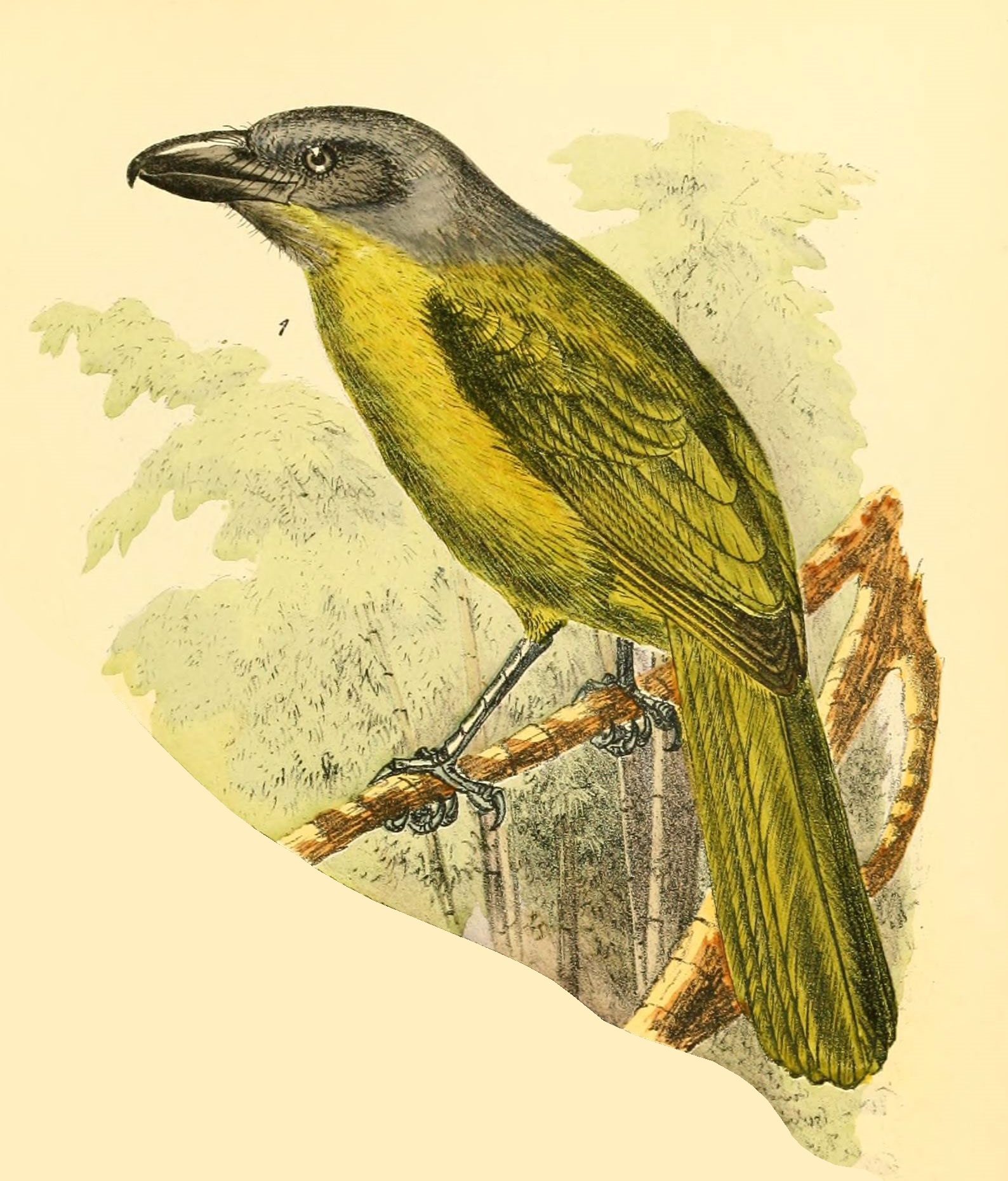

Conservation status
- Vulnerable (IUCN 3.1)

Scientific classification
- Kingdom: Animalia
- Phylum: Chordata
- Class: Aves
- Order: Passeriformes
- Family: Malaconotidae
- Genus: Malaconotus
- Species: M. gladiator

Binomial name
- Malaconotus gladiator (Reichenow, 1893)

= Green-breasted bushshrike =

Species of bird

The green-breasted bushshrike or gladiator bushshrike (Malaconotus gladiator) is a species of bird in the family Malaconotidae. It is found in the Cameroonian Highlands forests. With a total length of 25 to 28 cm (9.8 to 11.0 in) and a body mass of around 99 g (3.5 oz) this may be the largest of the Malaconotidae.

Its natural habitats are subtropical or tropical moist montane forests and subtropical or tropical high-altitude grassland. It is threatened by habitat loss.
