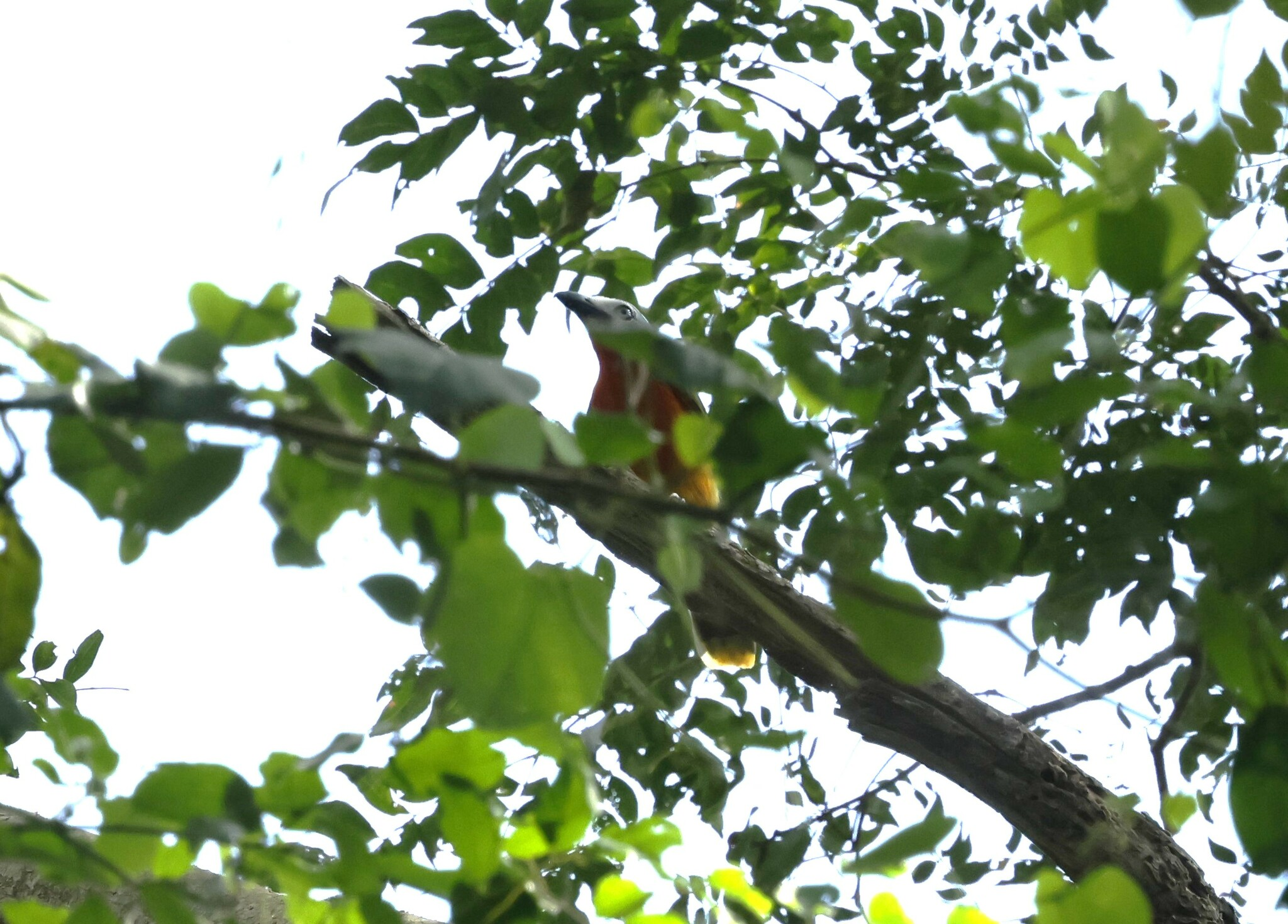

Conservation status
- Least Concern (IUCN 3.1)

Scientific classification
- Kingdom: Animalia
- Phylum: Chordata
- Class: Aves
- Order: Passeriformes
- Family: Malaconotidae
- Genus: Malaconotus
- Species: M. cruentus

Binomial name
- Malaconotus cruentus (Lesson, 1831)

= Fiery-breasted bushshrike =

Species of bird

The fiery-breasted bushshrike (Malaconotus cruentus) is a species of bird in the family Malaconotidae. It is found throughout the African tropical rainforest. Its natural habitats are subtropical or tropical dry forest and subtropical or tropical moist lowland forest.
