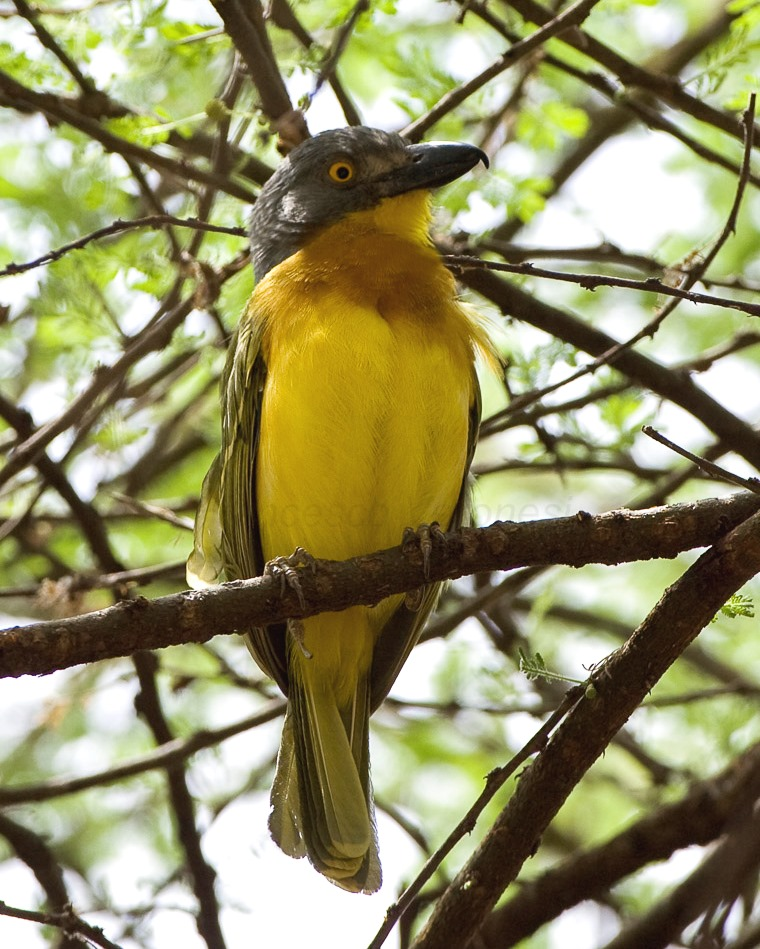

Conservation status
- Least Concern (IUCN 3.1)

Scientific classification
- Kingdom: Animalia
- Phylum: Chordata
- Class: Aves
- Order: Passeriformes
- Family: Malaconotidae
- Genus: Malaconotus
- Species: M. blanchoti

Binomial name
- Malaconotus blanchoti Stephens, 1826

= Grey-headed bushshrike =

Species of bird

The grey-headed bushshrike (Malaconotus blanchoti), colloquially known as the ghostbird, is a species of passerine bird in the family Malaconotidae. It is widespread throughout sub-Saharan Africa, although relatively absent in Central Africa and the interior of southern Africa. It is the most widespread species of its genus, which consists of large bushshrikes with massive bills and mournful hooting calls. It occurs sparsely in a range of wooded habitats, though typically in denser vegetation within dry or moist savannah. The monogamous pairs occupy woodland with sufficient cover. They are sedentary, but will undertake limited post-breeding movements.

== Subspecies ==
Six or seven subspecies are recognized. The tropical subspecies intergrade widely, and are locally not separable.

- M. b. blanchoti Stephens, 1826 — subtropical West Africa to subtropical Cameroon
- M. b. catharoxanthus Neumann, 1899 — subtropical Cameroon to tropical East Africa
- M. b. interpositus E.Hartert, 1911 — Angola and western Zambia, intermediates eastwards
- M. b. citrinipectus Meise, 1968 — northwestern Namibia, including Kunene River valley
- M. b. approximans (Cabanis, 1869) — Horn of Africa to northern Tanzania
- M. b. hypopyrrhus Hartlaub, 1844 — Rwanda, southwards to northern South Africa
- M. b. extremus Clancey, 1957 — Eastern Cape in South Africa

The subspecies are distinguished mainly on plumage colour. M. b. approximans has a variable amount of chestnut on the breast and flanks, which is absent in M. b. catharoxanthus, once treated as a separate species. The nominate subspecies displays intermediate underpart colours. Subspecies M. b. extremus (extremus = furthest outside, in terms of range) has darker upper and underpart plumage than the widespread M. b. hypopyrrhus (hypopyrrhus = red below), but is otherwise similar. M. b. citrinipectus has lemon yellow throat and upper breast plumage.

== Description ==
The sexes are alike, and measure 22.6 to 25.2 cm (bill to tail). The combination of formidable, black bill and rich yellow iris lends it a distinctive visage. Related bushshrike species have the white lore plumage extending beyond a whitish eye. Immatures are paler generally, while juveniles have pale yellow chest plumage, and brown barring or mottling over the crown. Juveniles are also distinguished by their brown eyes and brownish horn bills. The species occurs in sympatry with the orange-breasted bushshrike, which is similarly plumaged but smaller, with more gracile features.

== Distribution and habitat ==
In the subtropics it occurs in densities of 1 pair per 200 ha, and a breeding pair has a range of some 50 ha. In Zimbabwe it shows a close association with miombo woodland, while occurring more sparsely in semi-arid savannah. It is also found in riparian vegetation and associated tall Acacia, besides lowland evergreen thicket and forest, and the interior of riparian ground-water forest.

It is found from sea level to 1,500 metres, up to 1,600 metres in Zimbabwe, and in the tropics, locally up to 3,000 metres. It avoids areas with an annual rainfall below 500 mm. In southern Africa it is absent from Kalahari woodlands, and is largely replaced by the orange-breasted bushshrike in the Okavango Delta. It many areas it occurs in sympatry with the latter species, but may locally be found living in close proximity with several other bushshrike species. It is rarely found in plantations of alien trees, but more commonly in gardens, where it would be overlooked were it not for its frequent call notes.

== Behavior and ecology ==
=== Food ===
Their food consists mostly of insects, but they also prey on mice (swallowed whole), small birds, snakes, lizards and chameleons.

=== Vocalizations ===
Duet: drawn-out rasping notes by female with some hooting by the male in reply

Threat signaling (eg. between male rivals) – bill snapping combined with hooting

The best-known call is the male's uncanny, mechanical-sounding series of hooting notes, which particularly during the pre-breeding period, is frequently repeated. The prolonged sessions of measured, mournful notes may continue for an hour or more. These are delivered from a high perch, and are sometimes preceded by a cluck or tic sounds. His calling ceases once the female starts incubating however, when he begins to provide her with food items. Various softer sounds may also be heard at close quarters, besides a variety of abrupt clicks, ticks or clinks. A harsh alarm note and a duetting call are also known.

=== Breeding ===
The grey-headed bushshrike breeds in spring and summer. The pair builds a nest in 10 days, which is placed in the mid to upper stratum of a tree, well-hidden in thicker foliage, tangles or mistletoes. The nest shows some resemblance to that of a small raptor, whose old nests they may also appropriate. A clutch contains 2 to 4 elongate (29 x 21 mm), cream-coloured eggs, irregularly marked with grey and brown spots, that form a slight crown around the obtuse end. The clutch is incubated by the female only, over a period of 17 days. Chicks are reared by the female and leave the nest in three weeks.

== Gallery ==
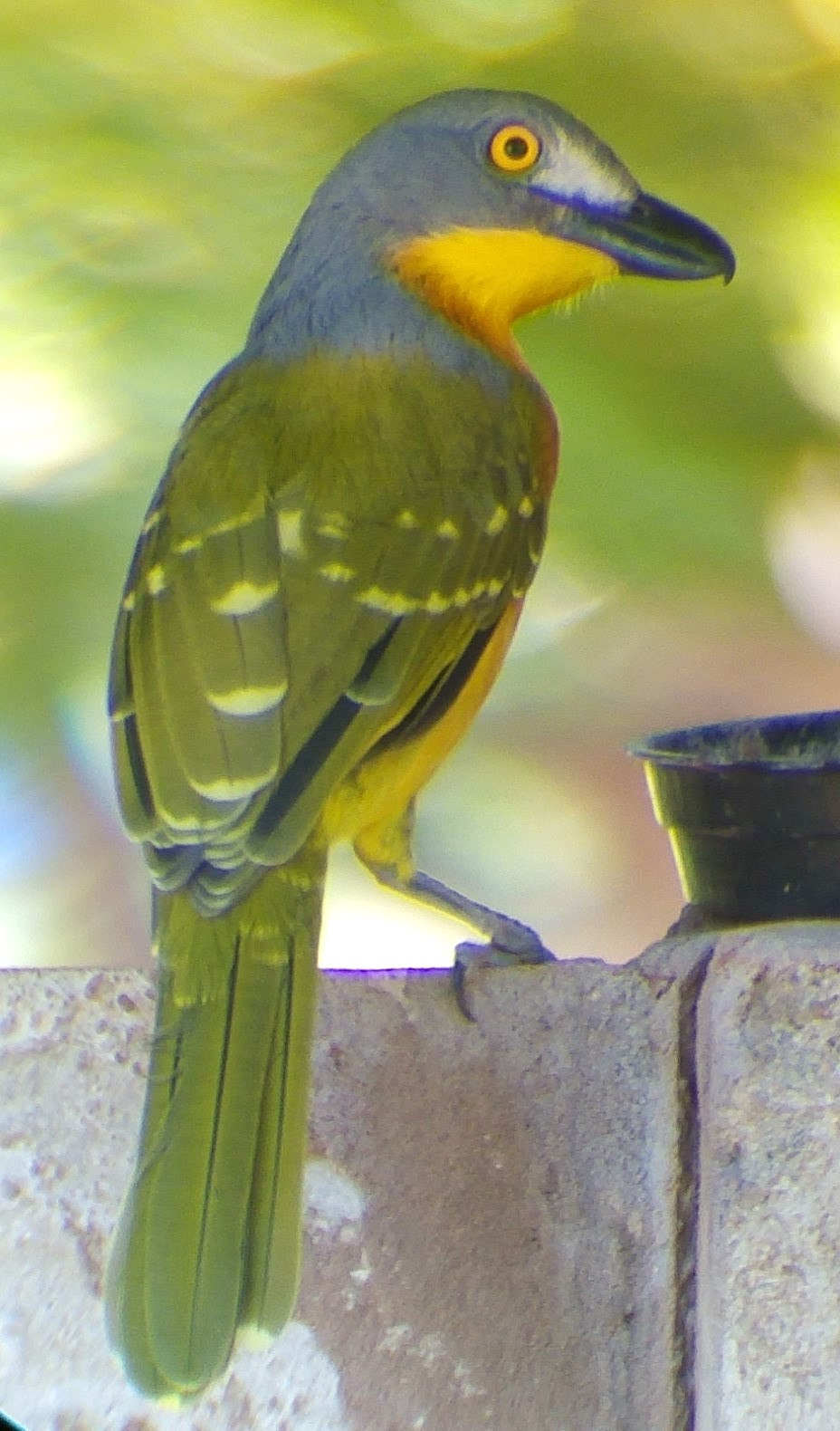
View of the speckled upperpart plumage

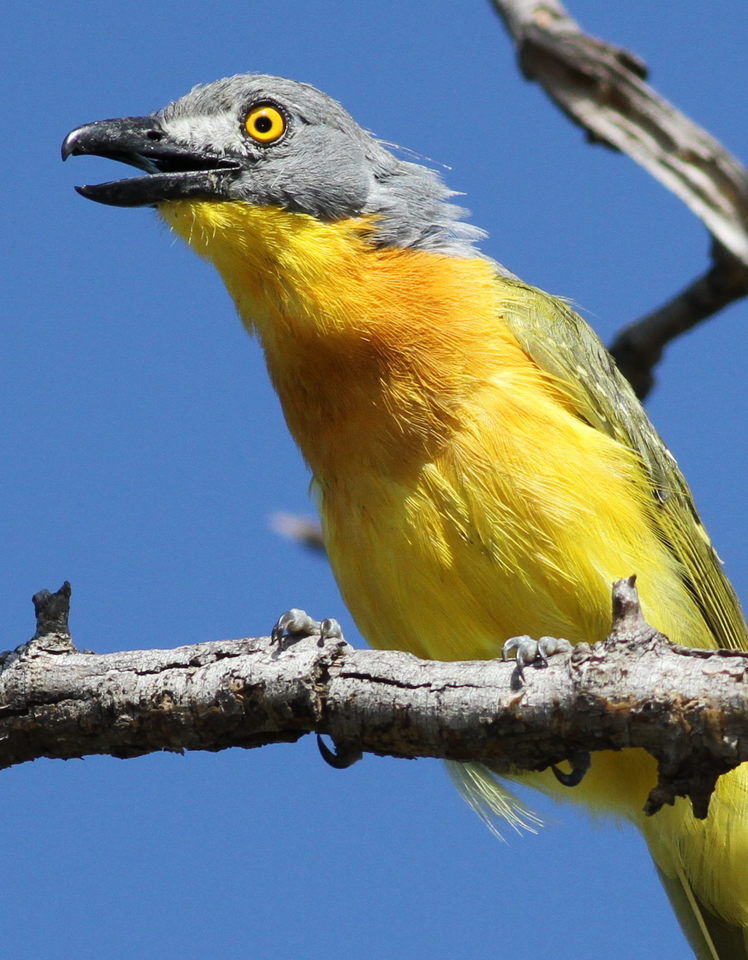
A calling male bird in Marakele N.P.

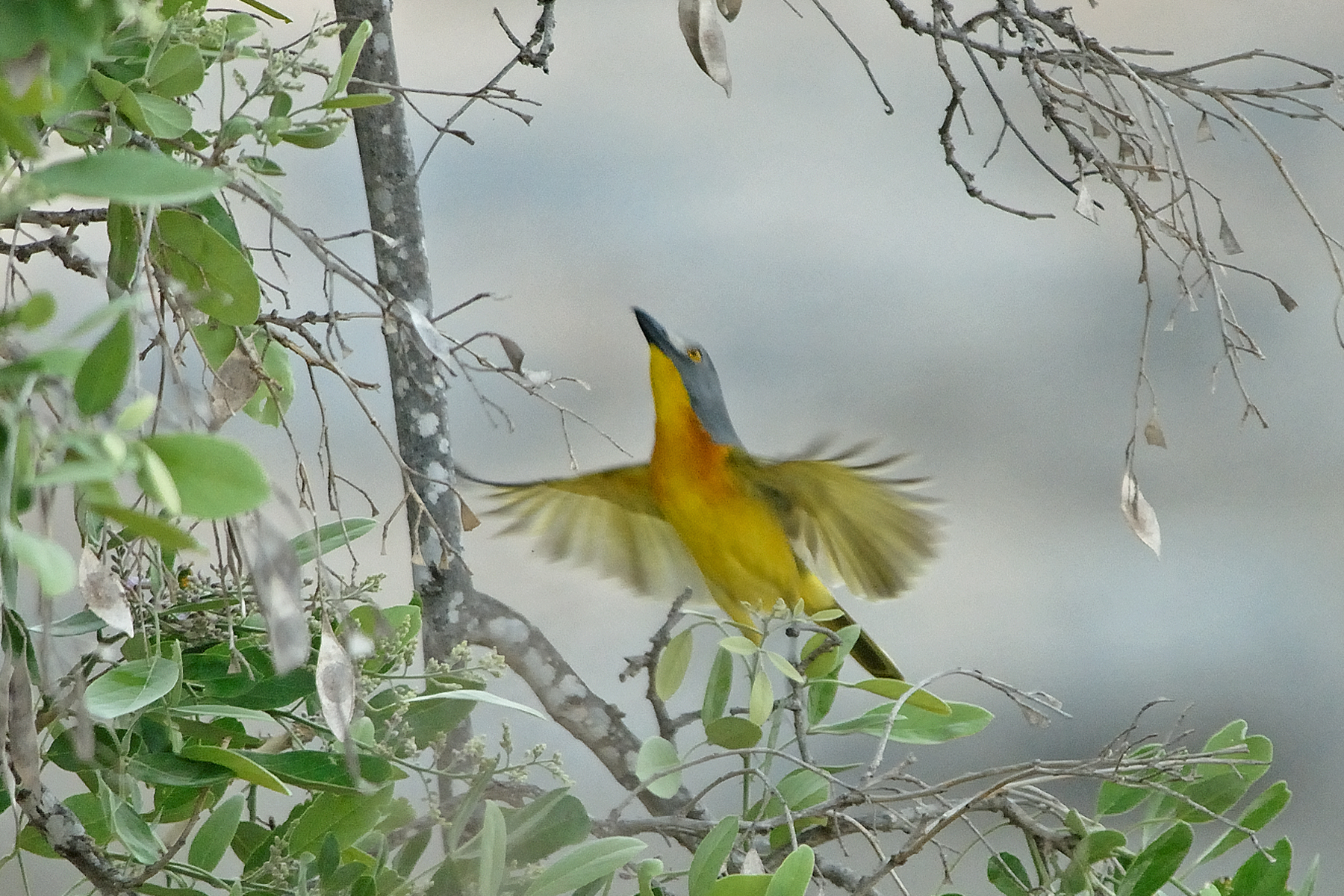
Foraging in a Philenoptera tree, Kruger Park

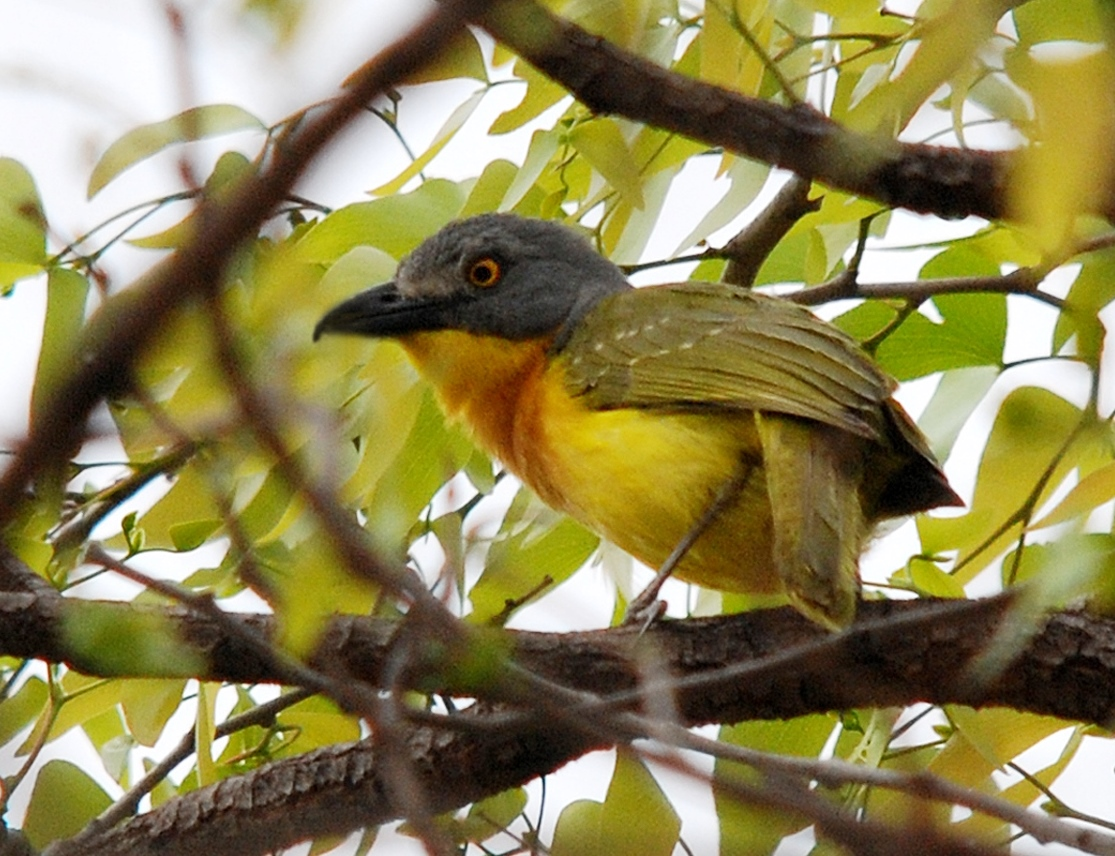
Foraging in mopane woodland, Kruger Park
