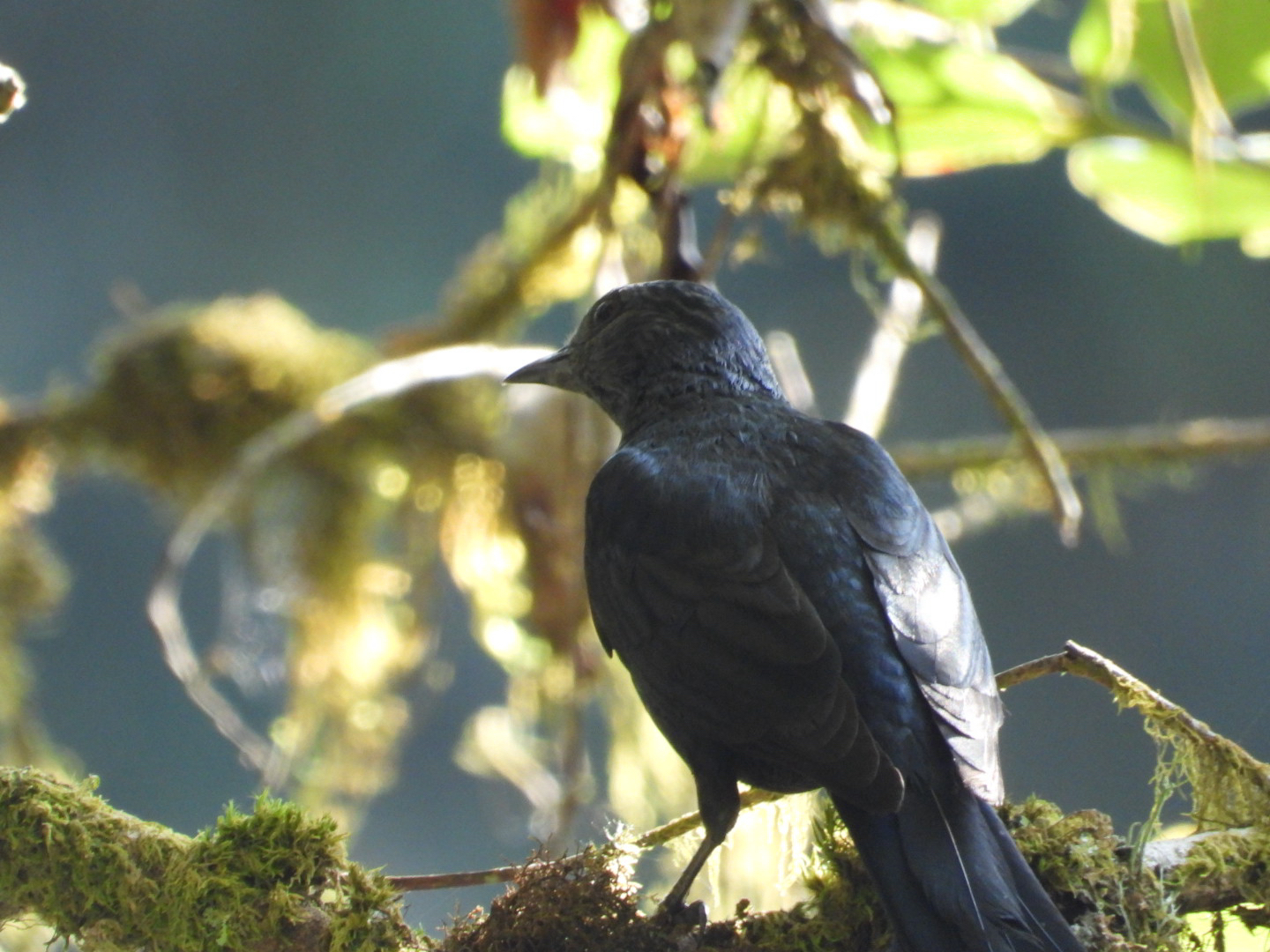

Conservation status
- Least Concern (IUCN 3.1)

Scientific classification
- Kingdom: Animalia
- Phylum: Chordata
- Class: Aves
- Order: Passeriformes
- Family: Malaconotidae
- Genus: Laniarius
- Species: L. holomelas

Binomial name
- Laniarius holomelas (Jackson, 1906)

= Albertine sooty boubou =

Species of bird

The Albertine sooty boubou (Laniarius holomelas) is a species of bird in the family Malaconotidae. It is native to the Albertine Rift montane forests.

It was formerly considered as a subspecies of the mountain sooty boubou (Laniarius poensis).
