= Gertrud Theiler =

South African parasitologist

- Born: 11 September 1897; Pretoria, South Africa
- Died: 2 May 1986 (aged 88); Stilbaai, South Africa
- Education: BSc, South African College, 1918; D.Sc. University of Neuchâtel, 1922
- Known for: Parasitologist
- Parent(s): Sir Arnold and Emma Sophie (Jegge) Theiler

Gertrud Theiler (11 September 1897 – 2 May 1986) was a South African parasitologist and teacher most noted for her work with nematodes and ticks.

== Early life ==
Born on 11 September 1897 in Pretoria, South Africa, Theiler graduated from Pretoria High School for Girls and spent a year at Rhodes University College in Grahamstown, South Africa, before transferring to South African College in Cape Town, where she graduated in 1918 with a Bachelor of Science degree. She went to Europe to undertake postgraduate work in helminthology at the University of Neuchâtel, Switzerland, where she took her Doctor of Science degree in 1923. The subject of her doctoral thesis is The Strongylids and other Nematodes Parasitic in The Intestinal Tract of South African Equines (PhD). Université de Neuchâtel. OCLC 9666178.. She then studied at the Liverpool School of Tropical Medicine, and the London School of Tropical Medicine, authoring four important scientific papers on research concerning the nematode parasites of South African equines.

== Teaching and research career ==
She returned to South Africa in 1924 and taught biology for 17 years, the last two at Jeppe High School for Girls in Johannesburg. She then secured a lectureship at Huguenot College in Wellington, South Africa, where in 1935 she was appointed to a professorship in Zoology and Physiology. In 1939 she lectured at Rhodes University College, before accepting a research post in the entomology section at Onderstepoort Veterinary Institute, where she studied ticks for the following 25 years, becoming well known around the world in her field. Her colleagues included the notable researchers Jane Brotherton Walker and Harry Hoogstraal.

She retired from her official duties in 1967, but continued to work at Onderstepoort as an emeritus faculty member until 1983, when deafness and failing sight forced her full retirement.

Theiler served on the Council of the Wild Life Protection and Conservation Society of South Africa for 30 years and as chairperson of the editorial committee for their magazine, African Wild Life, and was a founder of the Austin Roberts Bird Sanctuary in Pretoria. The last three years of her life were spent in Stilbaai (sometimes spelt Stillbay), South Africa, where she died on 2 May 1986.

== Honours ==
Theiler was awarded the Captain Scott Medal of the South African Biological Society in 1960, and the Elsdon Dew Medal of the Parasitological Society of Southern Africa in 1975.

The Gertrud Theiler Tick Museum housing the South Africa National Tick Collection which opened on 23 August 2005 at the Onderstepoort Veterinary Institute, Onderstepoort, South Africa, was named after Theiler in honor of the many years she dedicated to the collection.

The argasid tick Argas theilerae (Hoogstraal and Kaiser, 1970), "Theiler's African white-backed vulture argasid," the ixodid ticks Rhipicephalus gertrudae (Feldman-Muhsam, 1960) and Sharifiella theilerae (Hoogstraal 1953), and the parasitic wasp Hunterellus theilerae were named to honour Theiler for her many contributions to tick research.

== Personal ==
Theiler was the youngest daughter of Sir Arnold Theiler KCMG, founder and first director of the Veterinary Institute, Onderstepoort, and his wife, Emma Sophie Jegge; in 1971, she authored a biography of her father. She was a sister of virologist Max Theiler, who was awarded the 1951 Nobel Prize in Physiology or Medicine for development of the yellow fever vaccine.
