= Argas theilerae =

Scientific classification
- Kingdom: Animalia
- Phylum: Arthropoda
- Subphylum: Chelicerata
- Class: Arachnida
- Order: Ixodida
- Family: Argasidae
- Genus: Argas
- Species: A. theilerae

Binomial name
- Argas theilerae Hoogstraal & Kaiser, 1970

Species of tick

Argas theilerae (also known as Theiler's African white-backed vulture argasid) is a species of tick in the family Argasidae. The specific epithet honours South African parasitologist Dr. Gertrud Theiler. It is a parasite of the African white-backed vulture.

The species was first circumscribed by Hoogstraal & Kaiser in 1970.
