= Atherstone Nature Reserve =

Reserve in Limpopo province, South Africa

Atherstone Collaborative Nature Reserve
- Atherstone Nature Reserve
- Interactive map of Atherstone Collaborative Nature Reserve
- Location: South Africa
- Nearest city: Dwaalboom
- Coordinates: 24°34.491′S 26°47.112′E
- Area: 23,500 hectares (235 km^{2})
- Established: 1994
- Governing body: Management Authority is a collaboration between LEDET and Private Land Owners

Atherstone Collaborative Nature Reserve, also known as the Atherstone Nature Reserve, is a 23,500 hectare reserve situated near Dwaalboom in Limpopo, a province of South Africa. The reserve consists mainly of vast savannah plains with bushveld and Kalahari grasslands ecosystems. Besides antelope, zebra and giraffes, the south-central black rhinoceros and African bush elephants are some of the highlights of Atherstone.

== History ==
Norman Edward Atherstone, who was originally a cattle farmer, became the first game farmer in this area and did much to re-introduce some game on his farmland, which was to become Atherstone Game Reserve. He never had a wife nor children and, in his last will, he donated his farms to the former Transvaal Nature Conservation Department. In 1990 the Atherstone Nature Reserve was founded; it became the Atherstone Collaborative Nature Reserve in 1994, after some private farms were also incorporated into the reserve.

== Animals ==
The following list of animals were taken from a pamphlet of the nature reserve and from iNaturalist observations.

Common animal species found in the reserve:

| Buffalo | Caracal | Cheetah | Duiker–grey | Eland | Elephant |
| Gemsbuck | Genet | Giraffe | Hartebeest-red | Hyena–brown | Impala |
| Jackal-black-backed | Kudu | Leopard | Monkey-vervet | Rhino-black | Rhino-white |
| Sable antelope | Steenbok | Tsessebe | Warthog | Waterbuck | Wildebeest-blue |
| Zebra | | | | | |

Common bird species found in the reserve:

| Ostrich | Hamerkop | Hadeda ibis | African spoonbill | Whitefaced duck | Knobbilled duck |
| Egyptian goose | Secretary bird | Cape vulture | Lappet-faced vulture | White-backed vulture | Tawny eagle |
| Wahlberg's eagle | Martial eagle | Brown snake eagle | Black-breasted snake eagle | Bateleur | African fish eagle |
| Dark chanting goshawk | Gabar goshawk | Crested francolin | Swainson's francolin | Common quail | Melba finch |
| Helmeted guineafowl | Blue waxbill | Violet-eared waxbill | White-browed sparrow weaver | Paradise whydah | Kori bustard |
| Lesser masked weaver | Black korhaan | Redcrested korhaan | Crowned plover | Blacksmith plover | Spotted dikkop |
| Double-banded sandgrouse | Rock pigeon | Red-eyed dove | Cape turtle dove | Laughing dove | Namaqua dove |
| Green-spotted dove | Grey loerie | Jacobin cuckoo | Diederik cuckoo | Burchell's coucal | Barn owl |
| White-faced owl | Pearl-spotted owlet | Flernecked nightjar | Rufous-cheeked nightjar | European bee-eater | Little bee-eater |
| Blue-cheeked bee-eater | European roller | Purple roller | Lilac-breasted roller | Hoopoe | Grey hornbill |
| Southern yellow-billed hornbill | Southern red-billed hornbill | Pied barbet | European swallow | Fork-tailed drongo | Pied crow |
| Brown-hooded kingfisher | Titbabbler | Puffback | Long-billed crombec | Wattled starling | Burchell's starling |
| Groundscraper thrush | Marico sunbird | Red-billed oxpecker | | | |

== See also ==
- Protected areas of South Africa
- Limpopo Tourism and Parks Board
