= Rhipicephalus gertrudae =

Scientific classification
- Kingdom: Animalia
- Phylum: Arthropoda
- Subphylum: Chelicerata
- Class: Arachnida
- Order: Ixodida
- Family: Ixodidae
- Genus: Rhipicephalus
- Species: R. gertrudae

Binomial name
- Rhipicephalus gertrudae Feldman-Muhsam, 1960

Species of tick

Rhipicephalus gertrudae is a species of tick in the family Ixodidae. The specific epithet honors South African parasitologist Dr. Gertrud Theiler. The species was first circumscribed by Dr. Brouria Feldman-Muhsam.

Rhipicephalus gertrudae is moderate-sized, about 4 mm in length, heavily punctate, and reddish-brown in color. Adults are generalist hematophagous parasites, feeding primarily on domestic and wild herbivores such as cattle and sheep; the immatures are specialist hematophagous parasites of murid rodents. Heavy infestations have caused infant mortality in Chacma baboons in Namibia, through infestation of the muzzle causing inflammation of the nose and mouth that prevents suckling.

== Distribution ==
Namibia and South Africa.
