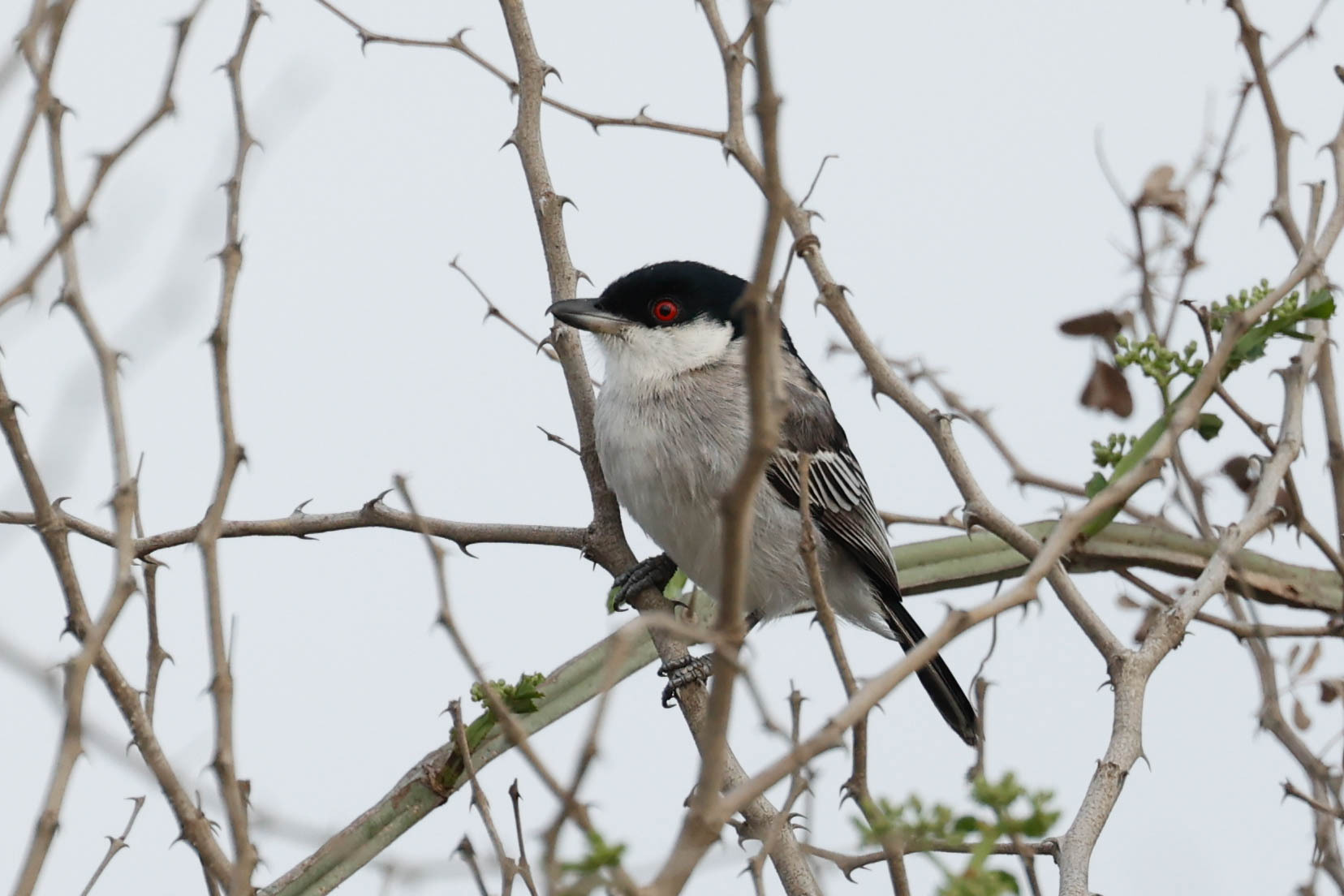

Conservation status
- Least Concern (IUCN 3.1)

Scientific classification
- Kingdom: Animalia
- Phylum: Chordata
- Class: Aves
- Order: Passeriformes
- Family: Malaconotidae
- Genus: Dryoscopus
- Species: D. pringlii

Binomial name
- Dryoscopus pringlii Jackson, 1893

= Pringle's puffback =

Species of bird

Pringle's puffback (Dryoscopus pringlii) is a species of bird in the family Malaconotidae. It is found in southern Ethiopia, Kenya, Somalia, and northern Tanzania. Its natural habitat is dry savanna.
