= Brouria Feldman-Muhsam =

20th Century Israeli medical entomologist and parasitologist (1916–2008)

- ברוריה פלדמן-מוחזם
- Born: 18 December 1916; Jerusalem, Palestine
- Died: 2008 (aged 91–92); Jerusalem, Israel
- Education: Levinsky College of Education, Teaching Certificate, 1935; University of Geneva, Lic. ès Sc., 1937; Hebrew University of Jerusalem, Ph.D., 1942
- Occupations: Medical Entomologist, Parasitologist
- Employer: Hebrew University of Jerusalem

Brouria Feldman-Muhsam (Hebrew: ברוריה פלדמן-מוחזם; 18 December 1916 – 2008) was an Israeli medical entomologist and parasitologist known for her pioneering work with mites and ticks. After earning her Teaching Certificate at Levinsky College of Education in Tel-Aviv in 1935, Feldman-Muhsam enrolled in the University of Geneva in Switzerland and completed her licence ès sciences in biology there in 1937, qualifying her for doctoral studies. She returned to Mandate Palestine in 1937 and earned her Doctor of Philosophy degree in Medical Entomology at the Hebrew University of Jerusalem, graduating in 1942.

== Career ==
After completing her Ph.D., Feldman-Muhsam worked as a research associate in the cancer research laboratory of the Hebrew University Medical School from 1942 to 1944. In 1944 she became a research associate in the Department of Parasitology at Hebrew University Medical School, and from 1961 to 1969 she was a senior lecturer there.< In 1968 she was appointed an associate professor and named head of the Department of Medical Entomology of Hebrew University of Jerusalem, and was promoted to full professor in 1976.

During her career, Feldman-Muhsam contributed over 100 articles to scientific journals including the Journal of Parasitology, Science, Nature, and other refereed journals, and photographed and produced science films on tick copulation and the movement of sperm in ticks. She is perhaps best known for her research on the physiology and ecology of ticks, particularly in defining the function of the areae porosae, and delineating the processes of tick copulation and reproduction. Her lifelong acarological collection is preserved in the Medical Parasitology Collection of the Hebrew University of Jerusalem.

== Personal life and death ==
Brouria Feldman was born on 18 December 1916 in Jerusalem, a daughter of Uria and Hanna (née Weinshenker) Feldman. She married in 1937 Helmut V. Muhsam, whom she met at the University of Geneva. Following his graduation with a doctorate in physics in 1937, they moved to Israel where he was on the faculty of Hebrew University.

Feldman-Muhsam died in Jerusalem in 2008.

== Honors ==
Feldman-Muhsam was selected the Helen Marr Kirbey Fellow of the International Association of University Women, in 1944; recipient of the Henrietta Szold prize, Municipality of Tel-Aviv, in 1955; recipient of a research grant awarded by the United States Public Health Service, National Institutes of Health, in 1955; election as a Fellow of the Royal Society of Tropical Medicine; and election to be president of the Israel Society of Parasitology 1983–1988.

== Acari described by Feldman-Muhsam ==
Feldman-Muhsam was the first to describe following species of Acari.

- Haemaphysalis adleri Feldman-Muhsam, 1951
- Haemaphysalis erinacei Feldman-Muhsam, 1951, currently a synonym of Haemaphysalis erinacei Pavesi, 1884
- Rhipicephalus gertrudae Feldman-Muhsam, 1960
- Rhipicephalus secundus Feldman-Muhsam, 1952, currently a synonym of Rhipicephalus turanicus Pomerantsev, 1936
- Podapolipus coccinellae Feldman-Muhsam and Havivi, 1972
- Podapolipus peruvensis Feldman-Muhsam and Havivi, 1974
- Podapolipus tribolii Feldman-Muhsam and Havivi, 1972
- Adlerocystis ornithodori Feldman-Muhsam and Havivi, 1963
- Adlerocystis parkeri Feldman-Muhsam and Havivi, 1963
- Nuttallia adleri Feldman-Muhsam, 1962, currently a synonym of Babesia merionis (Rousselot, 1953)

== Acari named in her honor ==
- Haemaphysalis muhsamae Santos Dias, 1954
- Rhipicephalus muhsamae Morel & Vassiliades, 1965
- Eutrombidium feldmanmuhsamae Feider, 1977
- Kurosapolipus feldmanmuhsamae Husband and Li, 1993
