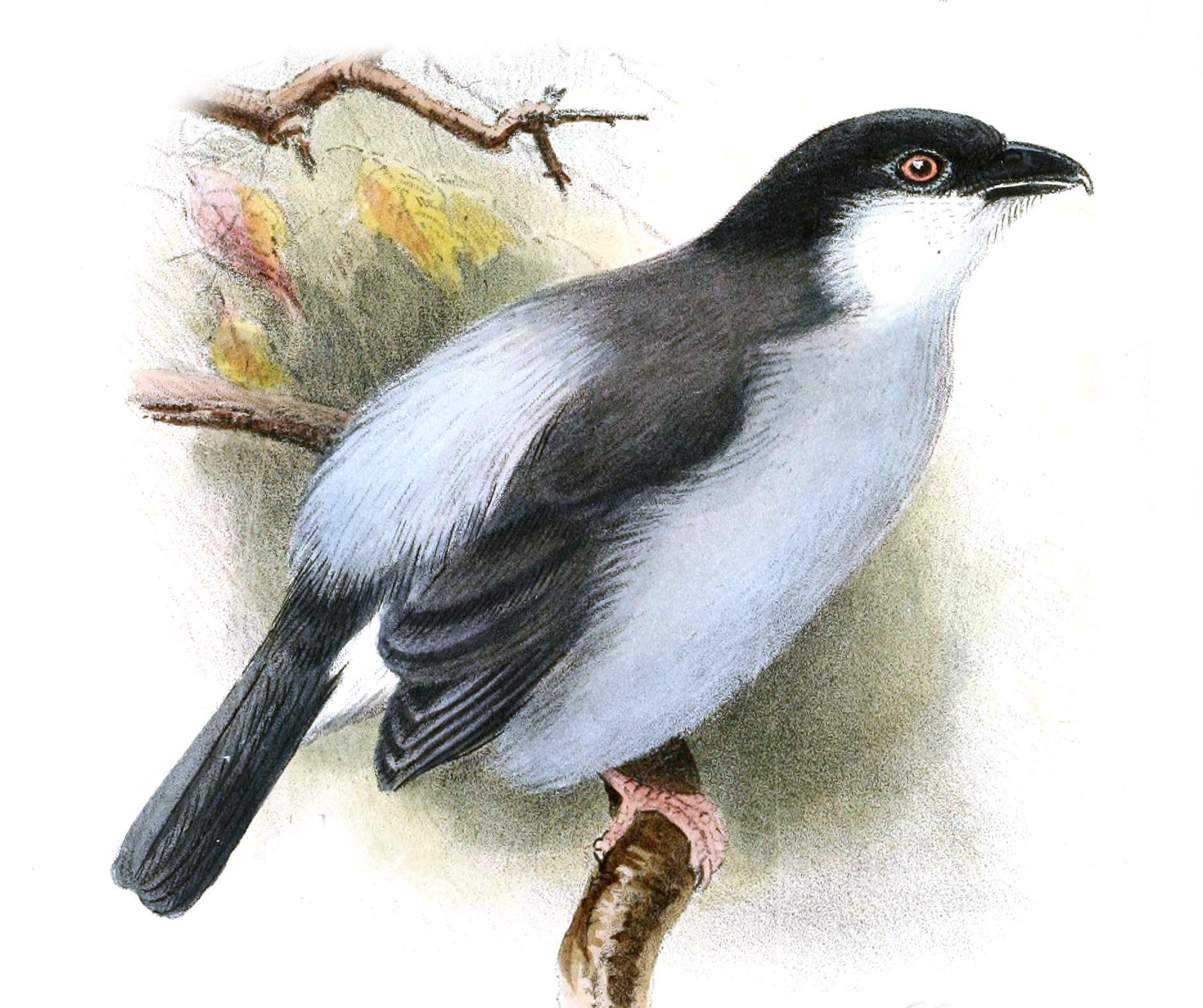

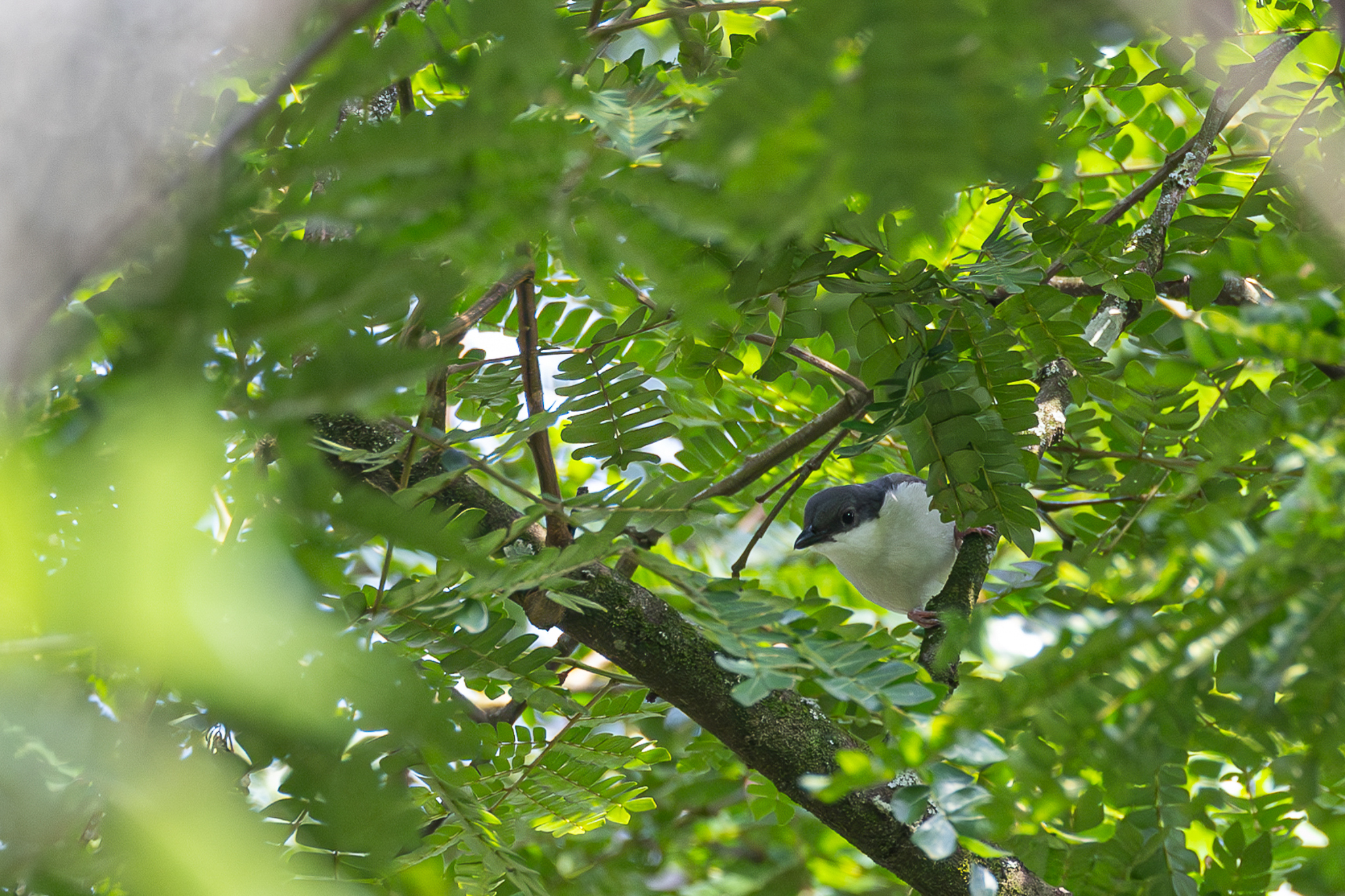

Conservation status
- Least Concern (IUCN 3.1)

Scientific classification
- Kingdom: Animalia
- Phylum: Chordata
- Class: Aves
- Order: Passeriformes
- Family: Malaconotidae
- Genus: Dryoscopus
- Species: D. angolensis

Binomial name
- Dryoscopus angolensis Hartlaub, 1860

= Pink-footed puffback =

Species of bird

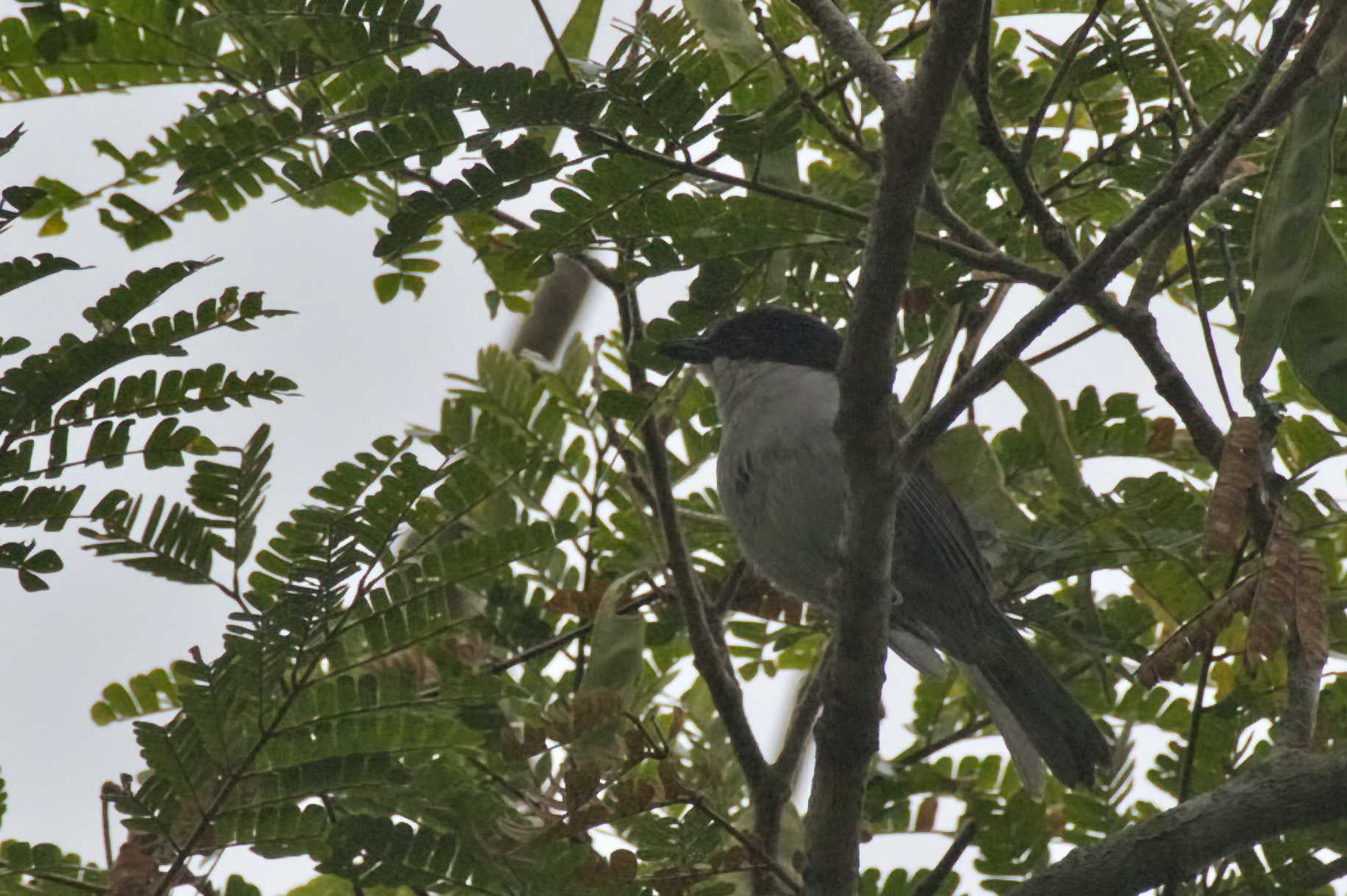
Pink-footed puffback

The pink-footed puffback (Dryoscopus angolensis) is a species of bird in the family Malaconotidae.

It is found in western Central Africa as well as in the Albertine Rift montane forests and northern adjacent areas of Kenya, Uganda and the eastern Congo Basin. Its natural habitat is subtropical or tropical moist montane forests.
