= Makram N. Kaiser =

Egyptian acarologist and parasitologist

- Born: 6 April 1930; Aswan, Egypt
- Died: 9 June 1996 (aged 66); Heliopolis, Egypt
- Education: Cairo University, Ain Shams University, Emory University
- Scientific career
- Workplaces: U.S. Naval Medical Research Unit No. 3, Food and Agriculture Organization of the United Nations

Makram Nasri Kaiser (1930–1996) was a medical and veterinary acarologist who was the world's leading authority on ticks of the genus Hyalomma.

== Education ==
Born in Aswan on April 6, 1930, Kaiser received his primary and secondary schooling in Egypt. He took his undergraduate education at Cairo University, completing a Bachelor of Science degree in agriculture in 1949. In 1962, he earned a Master of Science degree at Ain Shams University, with his thesis on hosts and ecological relationships of Egyptian Hyalomma ticks. He completed his Doctor of Philosophy degree in 1965 at Emory University in Atlanta, Georgia, with his research conducted at the United States Centers for Disease Control and Prevention (CDC). His dissertation resulted in the publication of five scientific papers describing a new subgenus and species of Argas, a rearing method for argasids, vector relationships and transmission of Quaranfil and Nyamanini viruses, and the inability of the fowl argasid Argas persicus (which also parasitizes wild birds) to transmit St. Louis encephalitis virus.

== Career ==
After completing his undergraduate education at Cairo University, Kaiser joined US Naval Medical Research Unit No. 3 (NAMRU-3), in Cairo, Egypt as a technical assistant, rising first to research associate and then to Deputy Head of the Department of Medical Zoology in 1965. In addition to his scientific labors, he provided administrative and management expertise to the department and intramural and extramural projects crucial to the unit's operations. He organized field teams and supervised on-site collecting in Egypt, guided visiting scientists into the Sahara Desert and Eastern Desert and conducted zoological and serological expeditions in Turkey, Lebanon, Kuwait, Yemen, Sudan, Ethiopia, Afghanistan and southern Europe. In collaboration with the National Institute of Health's Rocky Mountain Laboratory, the University of Maryland-Kuala Lumpur Institute for Medical Research, Australia's Commonwealth Scientific and Industrial Research Organisation (CSIRO), University of Sri Lanka, and the East African Veterinary Research Organization, he provided expertise on ticks and tick-associated problems in Ethiopia, Malaysia, Thailand, Australia, Sri Lanka, Kenya, Tanganyika and Uganda. He also performed research in Cairo elucidating the epidemiology and public health impact of ticks parasitizing birds migrating to and from Europe, Asia and Africa through Egypt.

After completing his doctorate, Kaiser returned to NAMRU-3 and worked on a number of public health projects during the following decade. In 1975, he retired from NAMRU-3 and took a position as Expert Consultant with the Food and Agricultural Organization of the United Nations, accepting a 4-year tour in Uganda investigating the ecology of cattle ticks and quantifying tick burdens on Zebu cattle. A follow-on assignment took him to Burundi for a 7-year tour continuing his studies of the ecology, population dynamics and control of ticks on Zebu cattle. Later postings with the FAO took him to St. Lucia and Ethiopia, where he consulted at tick-control project sites. In 1990 he retired from active service and returned to his home in Heliopolis, where he died on June 9, 1996.

Hyalomma species ticks occur in the Mediterranean basin and Africa eastward to India. Due to their extreme infraspecific variability, they are particularly difficult to identify. Kaiser was considered by his peers to be the only taxonomist ever to have mastered the genus. Noted authorities in the fields of ticks and tickborne diseases with whom Kaiser published over 80 scientific papers during his career include Jane Brotherton Walker, Robert W. Sutherst, Robert E. Shope, Richard A. Ormsbee, Harry Hoogstraal, Glen M. Kohls, Carleton M. Clifford, and Jordi Casals.

== Honors ==
Kaiser's contributions to tick taxonomy were honored by his peers with the naming of the species Ixodes kaiseri Arthur, 1957 and the Haemaphysalis subgenus Kaiseriana Santos Dias, 1963. The scientific name of the bushy-tailed jird subspecies found in the Eastern Desert of Egypt, Sekeetamys calurus makrami (Setzer, 1961), honors his collecting activities.
