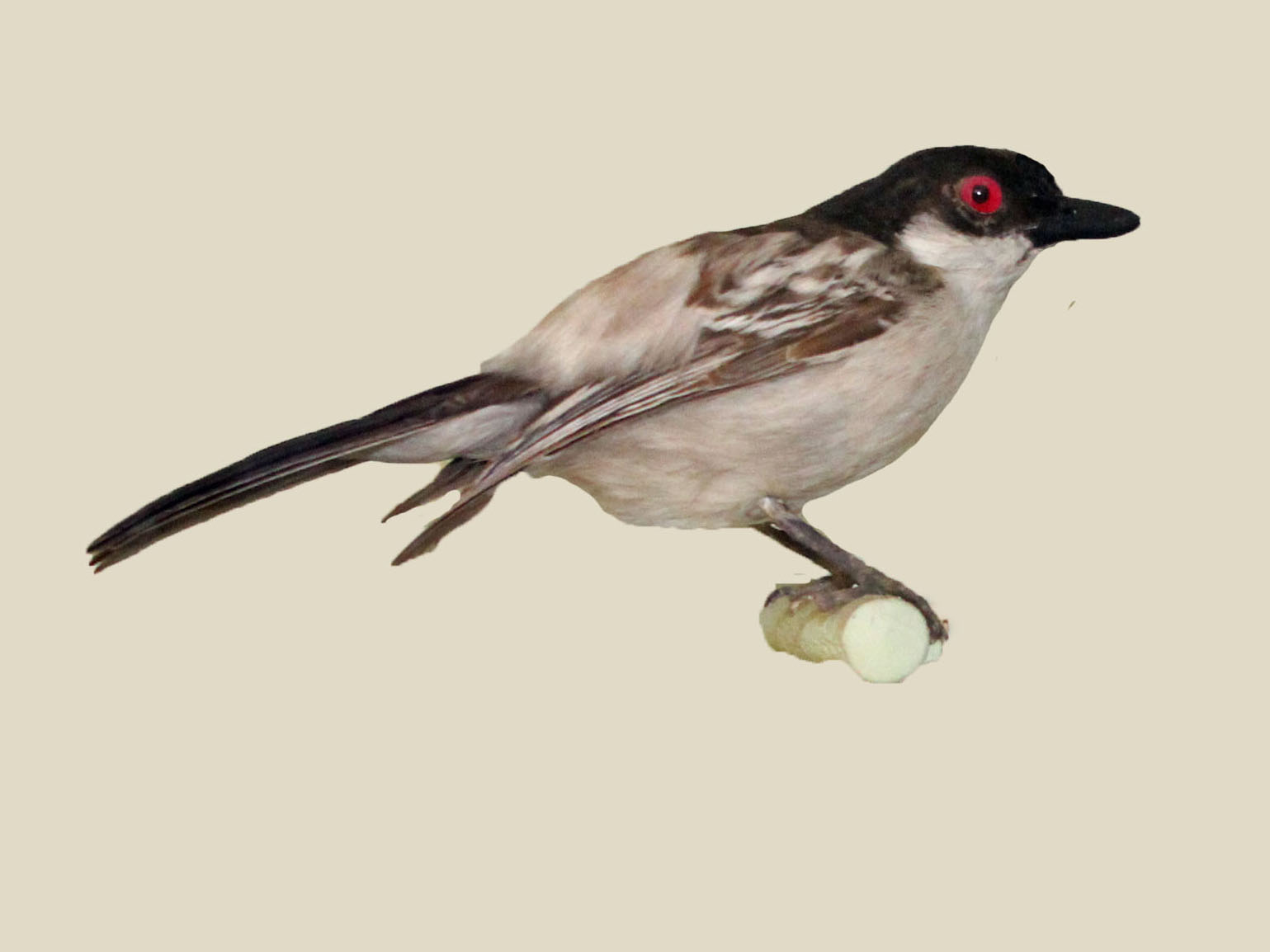

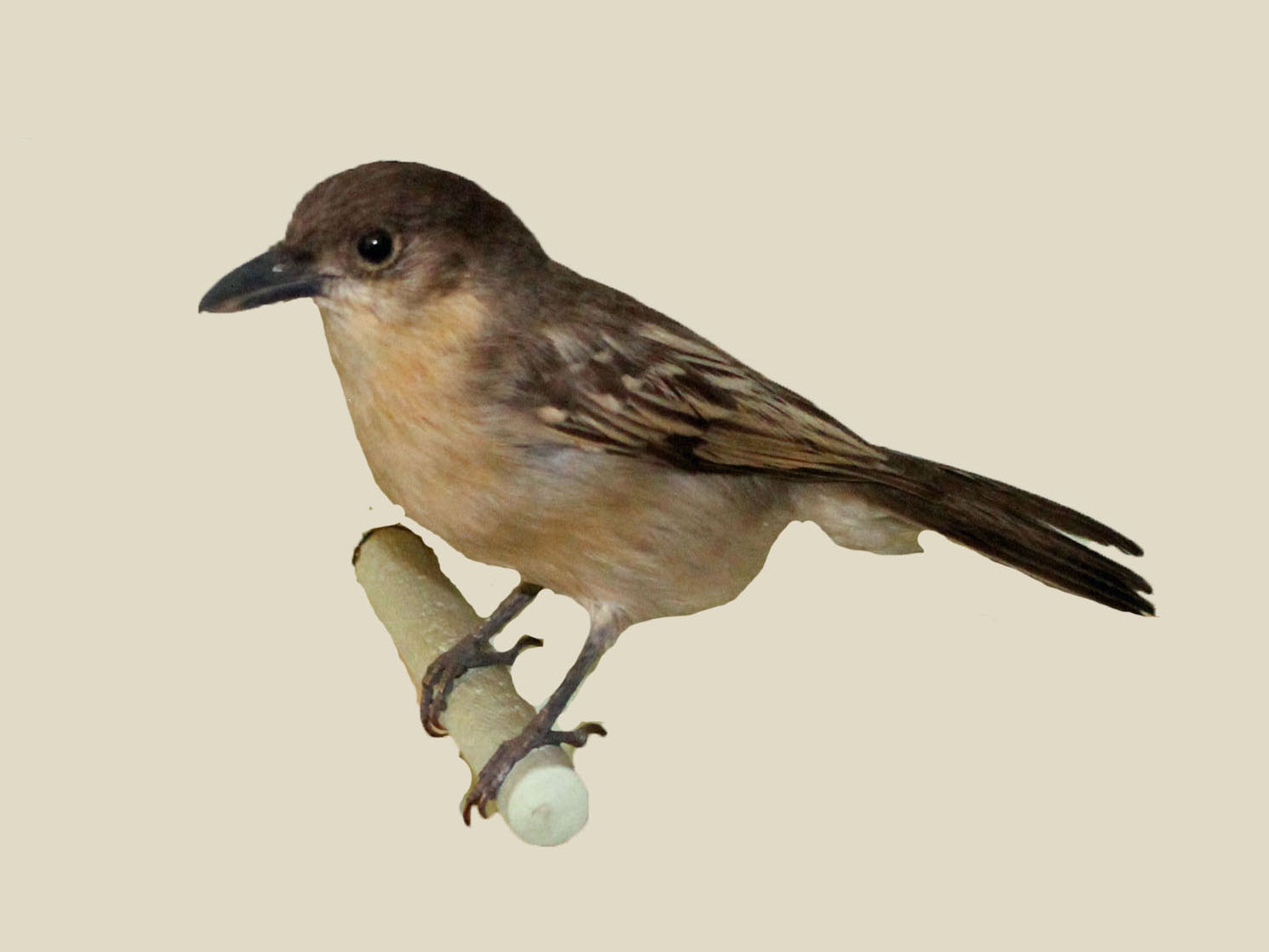
- male and female

Conservation status
- Least Concern (IUCN 3.1)

Scientific classification
- Kingdom: Animalia
- Phylum: Chordata
- Class: Aves
- Order: Passeriformes
- Family: Malaconotidae
- Genus: Dryoscopus
- Species: D. gambensis

Binomial name
- Dryoscopus gambensis (Lichtenstein, MHC, 1823)

= Northern puffback =

Species of bird

The northern puffback (Dryoscopus gambensis) is a species of bird in the family Malaconotidae. It is found in northern sub-Saharan Africa. It forms a superspecies with the black-backed puffback, which replaces it in eastern equatorial and southern Africa.

== Habitat ==
Its natural habitats are subtropical or tropical moist lowland forests, subtropical or tropical mangrove forests, and moist savanna.

== Subspecies ==
There are five accepted subspecies:

- D. g. gambensis (M. H. C. Lichtenstein, 1823) – Senegambia to coastal Gabon
- D. g. congicus Sharpe, 1901 – lower catchment of Congo River
- D. g. malzacii (Heuglin, 1870) – eastern Cameroon to northwestern Tanzania
- D. g. erythreae Neumann, 1899 – Eritrea to South Sudan
- D. g. erwini Sassi, 1923 – Itombwe in eastern DRC

== Gallery ==
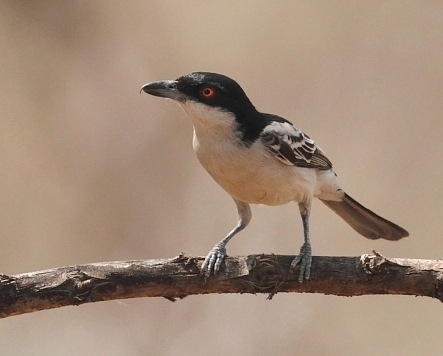
Male D. g. gambensis at Mole National Park, Ghana

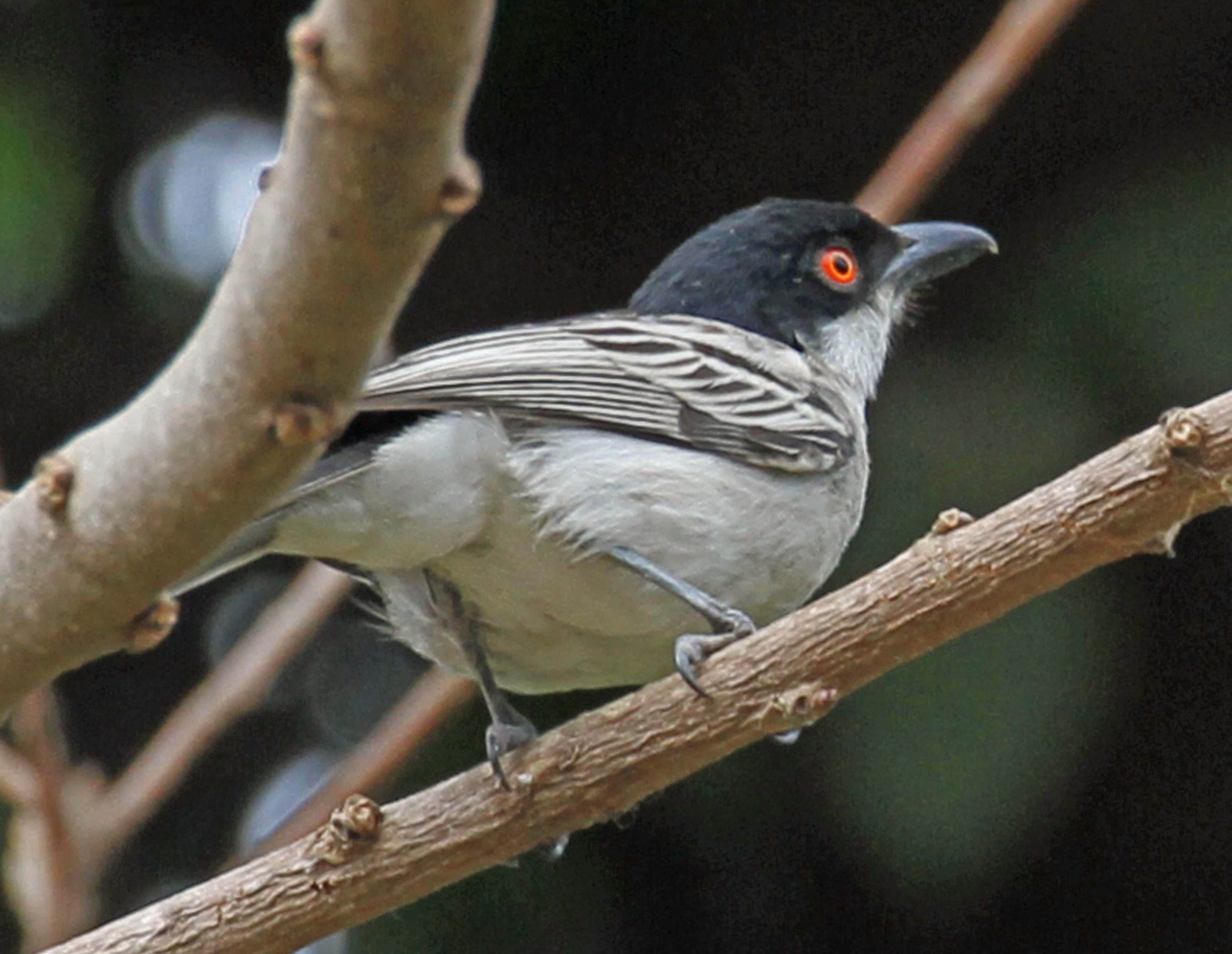
Male D. g. gambensis in The Gambia

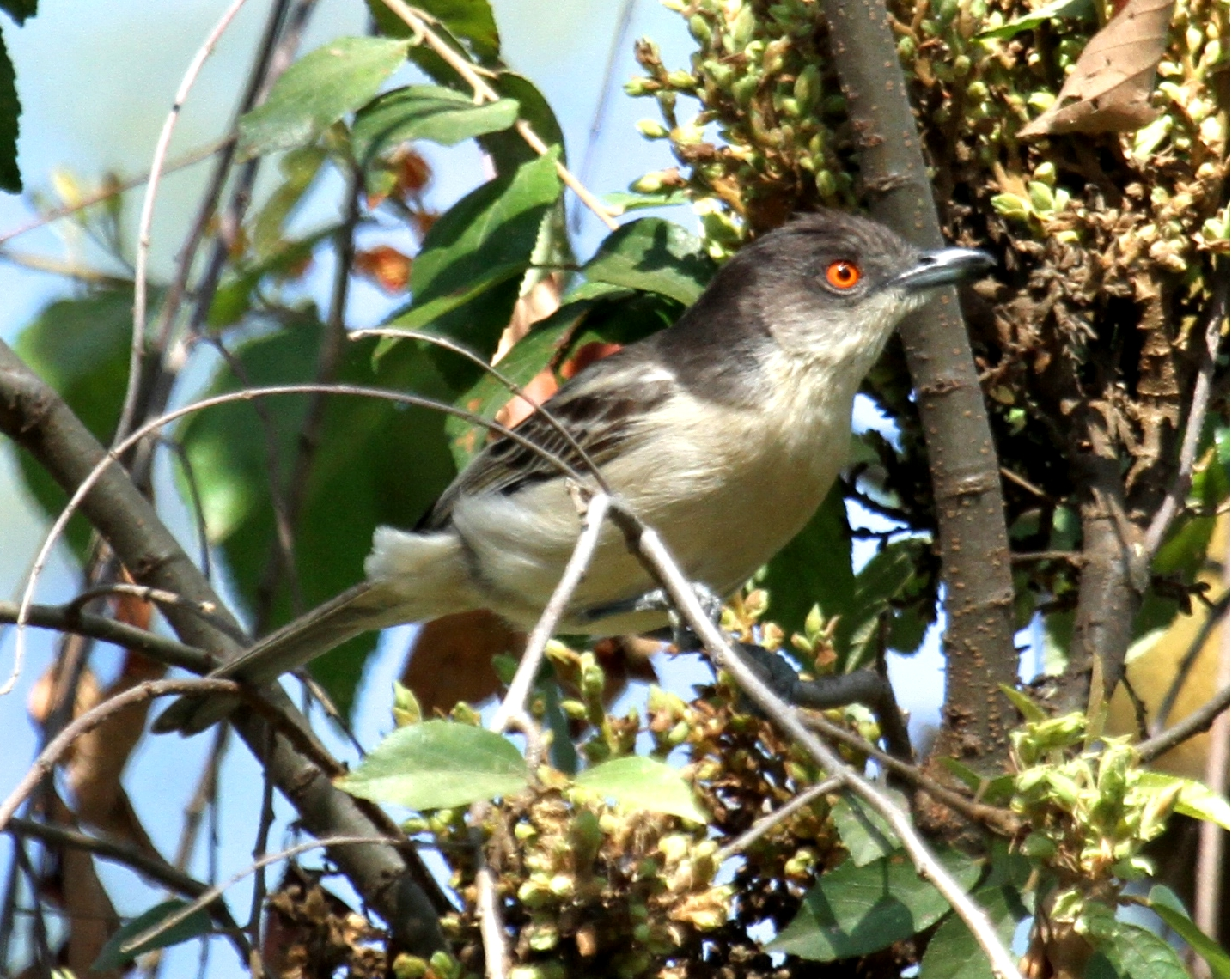
Male D. g. malzacii at Lake Nakuru N.P., Kenya
