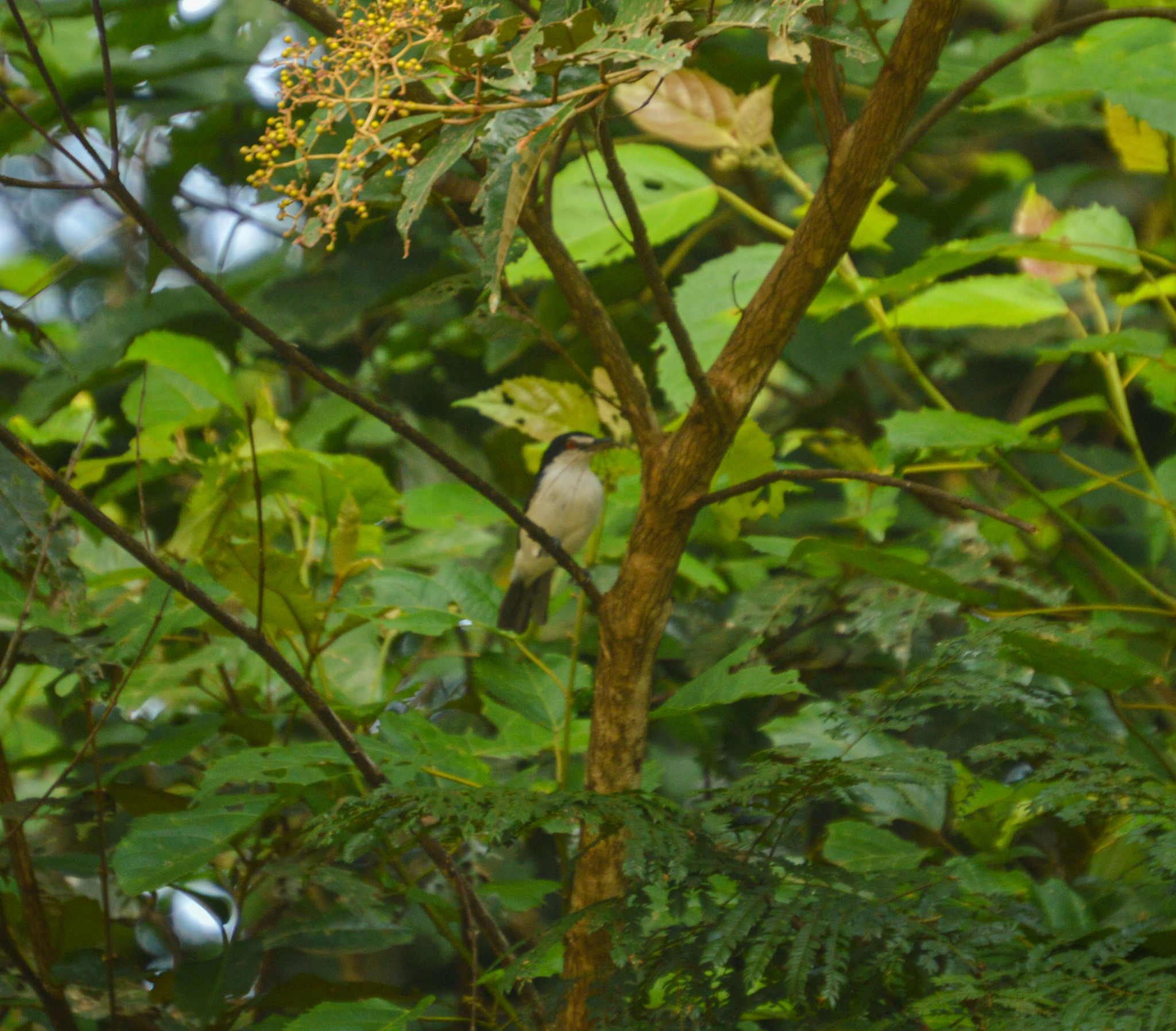

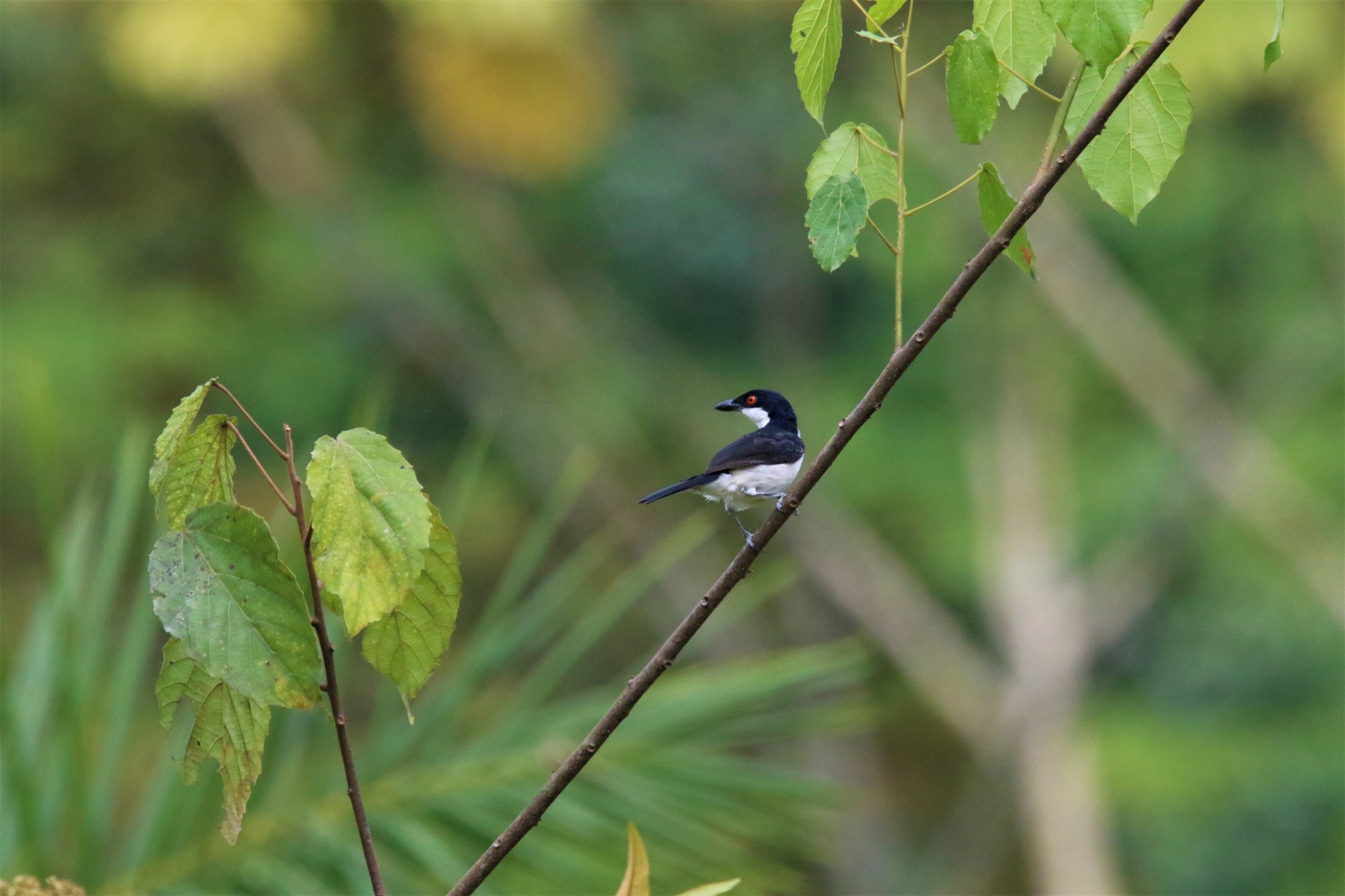

Conservation status
- Least Concern (IUCN 3.1)

Scientific classification
- Kingdom: Animalia
- Phylum: Chordata
- Class: Aves
- Order: Passeriformes
- Family: Malaconotidae
- Genus: Dryoscopus
- Species: D. senegalensis

Binomial name
- Dryoscopus senegalensis (Hartlaub, 1857)

= Red-eyed puffback =

Species of bird

The red-eyed puffback (Dryoscopus senegalensis) is a species of bird in the family Malaconotidae. It is found in Nigeria and Central Africa. Its natural habitat is subtropical or tropical moist lowland forests.
