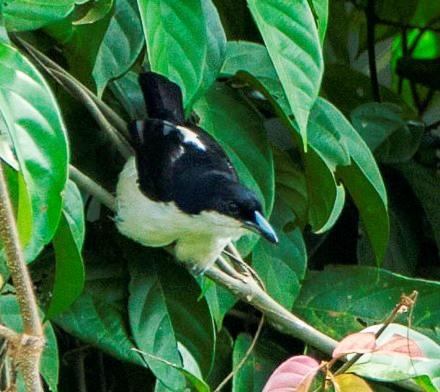

Conservation status
- Least Concern (IUCN 3.1)

Scientific classification
- Kingdom: Animalia
- Phylum: Chordata
- Class: Aves
- Order: Passeriformes
- Family: Malaconotidae
- Genus: Dryoscopus
- Species: D. sabini

Binomial name
- Dryoscopus sabini (Gray, JE, 1831)

= Sabine's puffback =

Species of bird

Sabine's puffback (/ˈseɪbɪn/ SAY-bin; Dryoscopus sabini), also known as the large-billed puffback, is a species of bird in the family Malaconotidae. It is native to the African tropical rainforest (western and sparsely throughout Central Africa). Its natural habitats are subtropical or tropical moist lowland forests and subtropical or tropical swamps.

Its common name and Latin binomial commemorate General Sir Edward Sabine.
