= Ixodes kaiseri =

Scientific classification
- Kingdom: Animalia
- Phylum: Arthropoda
- Subphylum: Chelicerata
- Class: Arachnida
- Order: Ixodida
- Family: Ixodidae
- Genus: Ixodes
- Species: I. kaiseri

Binomial name
- Ixodes kaiseri Arthur, 1957

Species of tick

Ixodes kaiseri is an Old World species of ixodid tick that parasitizes badgers, foxes, steppe polecats, raccoon dogs, and common hedgehogs in forest habitats and along heavily overgrown riverbanks and depressions in steppe habitats; they have also been collected from domestic dogs visiting these habitats. The specific epithet honors the scientific contributions of Dr. Makram N. Kaiser.

Ixodes kaiseri occurs in Moldavia, southern Ukraine and Crimea, Romania, Egypt and Israel, with single finds recorded from the northern Caucasus, Armenia, Azerbaijan and Georgia. Its range overlaps that of Ixodes crenulatus, with corresponding developmental stages found together on the same hosts.

All developmental stages of I. kaiseri are found on its host animals from March through October, with hosts highly infested in March and April after hibernation and all tick developmental stages, most in a fed condition, present. Males are rarely found on hosts, suggesting that in this species, as in other burrow-inhabiting ixodids, the adult males do not feed, and copulation occurs in the burrows.
