= Jane Brotherton Walker =

Kenyan-born British taxonomist and parasitologist

- Born: 31 January 1925; Nairobi, Kenya
- Died: 3 April 2009 (aged 84); Pretoria, South Africa
- Education: B.Sc. (Honours), 1948, M.Sc., 1959, Liverpool University; D.Sc. (Hon.), University of the Witwatersrand, 1983
- Known for: Parasitologist

Jane Brotherton Walker (31 January 1925 – 3 April 2009) was a Kenyan-South African scholar in the field of tick taxonomy, particularly in Africa.

Born on 31 January 1925 in Nairobi, Kenya, Walker grew up on a farm and was home-schooled by her mother during her primary school years. She completed her secondary education in England where she graduated from the Retford High School for Girls in 1944. During her time in England, she contracted poliomyelitis, the sequelae of which would progressively affect her ability to walk, particularly during her senior years. She earned her Bachelor of Science (with Honours) degree in 1948 and her Master of Science degree in 1959, both at Liverpool University. In 1983, she was awarded a Doctor of Science (Hon.) degree by the University of the Witwatersrand, Johannesburg, South Africa.

Walker was first employed in 1949 in the Research Branch of His Majesty's Overseas Civil Service as a Research Officer in the East African Veterinary Research Organization in Muguga, Kenya, where she rose to Principal Scientific Officer before taking up a post as Senior Professional Officer at the Veterinary Research Institute, Onderstepoort, in 1966 upon the retirement of Gertrud Theiler. She spent the remainder of her working life at the institute, rising through the ranks to Chief Veterinary Researcher, and serving as Specialist Scientist until failing health forced her retirement in 1990. After her formal retirement, she continued to work when able at Onderstepoort in an emeritus capacity until 1998. She was a leading expert on the tick genus Rhipicephalus and the African Amblyommas and served as a member of the Editorial Committee of the Onderstepoort Journal of Veterinary Research from 1969 to 2000. During her active career, Walker authored or co-authored 53 scientific publications and five books, and described 18 new tick species. She also helped train other researchers, including Gertrud Theiler and Harry Hoogstraal.

Walker died at her home in Pretoria on the morning of 3 April 2009.

== Honors ==
In addition to the honorary Doctor of Science the University of the Witwatersrand awarded her in 1983, Walker was recognized by her peers with three of the most prestigious awards in the field of biological sciences in South Africa, the 1988 Elsdon Dew Medal of the Parasitological Society of Southern Africa for outstanding service rendered to Parasitology in Africa, the Agricultural Science and Technology Woman of the Year Award for 1998, and the Theiler Memorial Trust Award in 1998 for exceptional service rendered to Veterinary Science in Africa. The argasid tick Argas walkerae Kaiser & Hoogstraal, 1969, "Walker's South African fowl argasid" and the ixodid tick Haemaphysalis walkerae Apanaskevich & Tomlinson, 2019 were named to honor her contributions to the body of knowledge about ticks.
