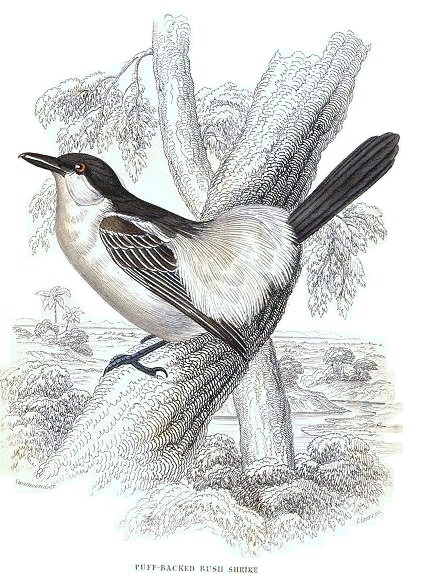
- Displaying D. gambensis male

Scientific classification
- Kingdom: Animalia
- Phylum: Chordata
- Class: Aves
- Order: Passeriformes
- Family: Malaconotidae
- Genus: Dryoscopus; F. Boie, 1826

Type species
- Lanius cubla Latham, 1801

= Dryoscopus =

Genus of birds

Dryoscopus is a genus of bird in the Malaconotidae or bushshrike family. Its members are known as puffbacks. The six species, all of fairly uniform appearance and habits, are native to various parts of sub-Saharan Africa. The name Dryoscopus is a compound Greek word: drus from the Greek word for "tree" and skopos, meaning "watcher or lookout".

== Structure and habits ==
Puffbacks are small, active bushshrikes that show a superficial resemblance to boubous. They however display only rudimentary duetting, have red or reddish irides, are smaller and compact with bouncy flight, and display sexual dimorphism. Characteristically, the long, loose and pale feathers of the male bird's back and rump are puffed out conspicuously during display. At the same time he may fly about, calling loudly. Comparable habits are found in some related genera (cf. Bocagia, Bias, Lanioturdus, Batis and Dyaphorophyia).

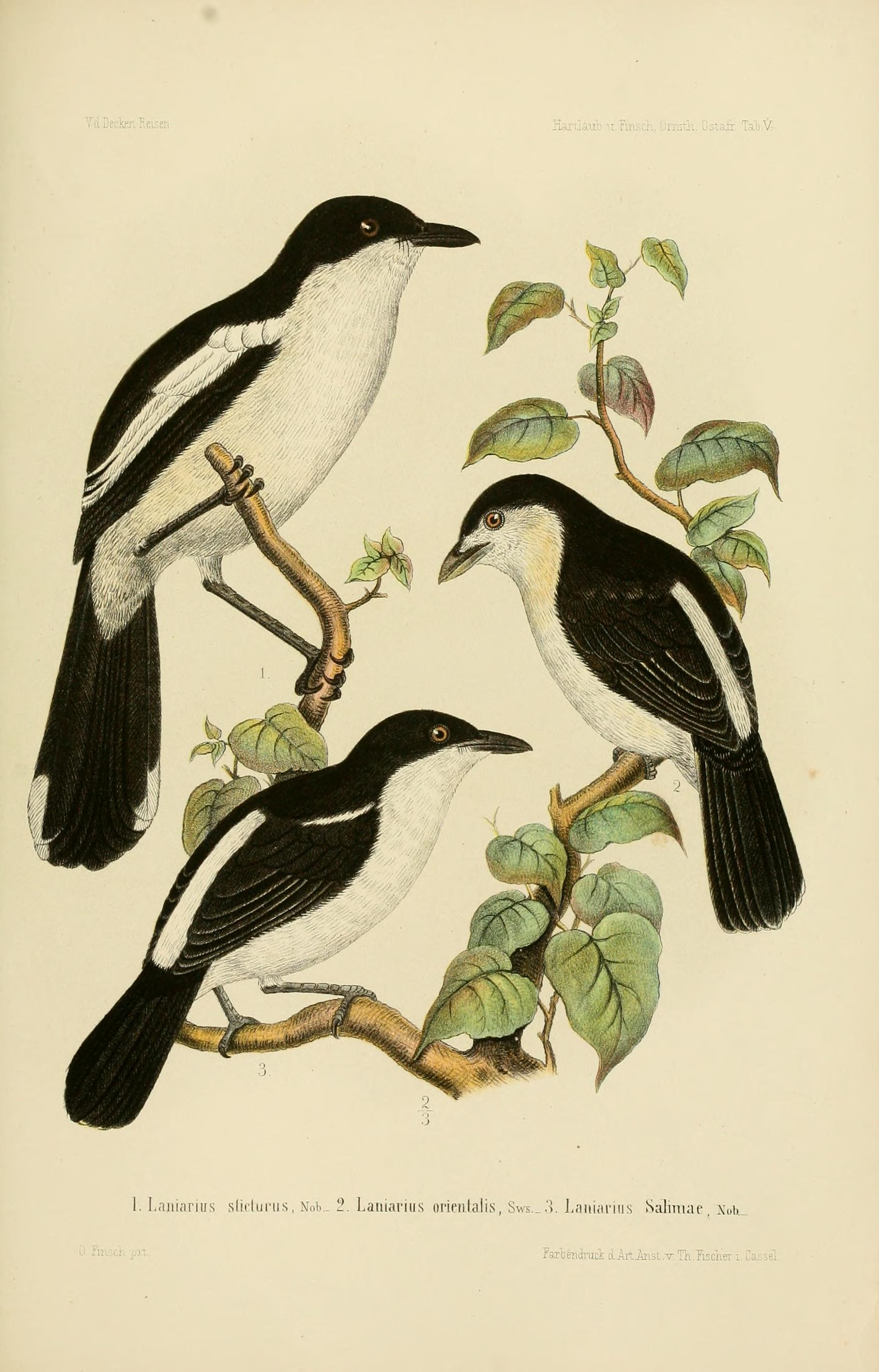
Laniarius (top left) vs. Dryoscopus (below and right)

They move about in pairs in the upper strata of trees (Pringle's excepting) and may join mixed-species flocks. They command a varied repertoire of explosive and fricative whistles, percussive clicking sounds, and harsh rasping, churring or tearing sounds. Three species have a rasping alarm call (cubla, senegalensis and pringlii), while the remaining three (gambensis, angolensis and sabini) have a stuttering alarm call. Wing fripping and bill snapping complement vocal communication. The nest is a neat compact cup in the general fashion of bushshrikes, but similar to those of shrike-flycatchers. Courtship feeding is present, and studied species are monogamous and single-brooded.

== Relationships ==
DNA-DNA hybridization studies suggest that the genus Tchagra is its closest relative, though biological traits also link it to Laniarius, shrike-flycatchers (i.e. Bias and Megabyas) and other genera.

== Species ==
The genus contains the following six species:

Image	Common name	Scientific name	Habitat	Distribution
	Pink-footed puffback	Dryoscopus angolensis	isolated montane and submontane forests	Kenya, Uganda and the eastern Congo Basin
	Black-backed puffback	Dryoscopus cubla	tropical to austral woodlands and afromontane forest	sub-Saharan Africa, from southern Somalia to coastal South Africa.
	Northern puffback	Dryoscopus gambensis	equatorial to sub-Saharan wooded savannah	northern sub-Saharan Africa
	Pringle's puffback	Dryoscopus pringlii	dry, equatorial acacia scrub and thicket	Ethiopia, Kenya, Somalia, and northern Tanzania
	Sabine's puffback	Dryoscopus sabini	tropical forest	Congo basin and West African coast
	Red-eyed puffback	Dryoscopus senegalensis	mid-canopy at tropical forest edge and clearings	Nigeria and Central Africa.

== Gallery ==
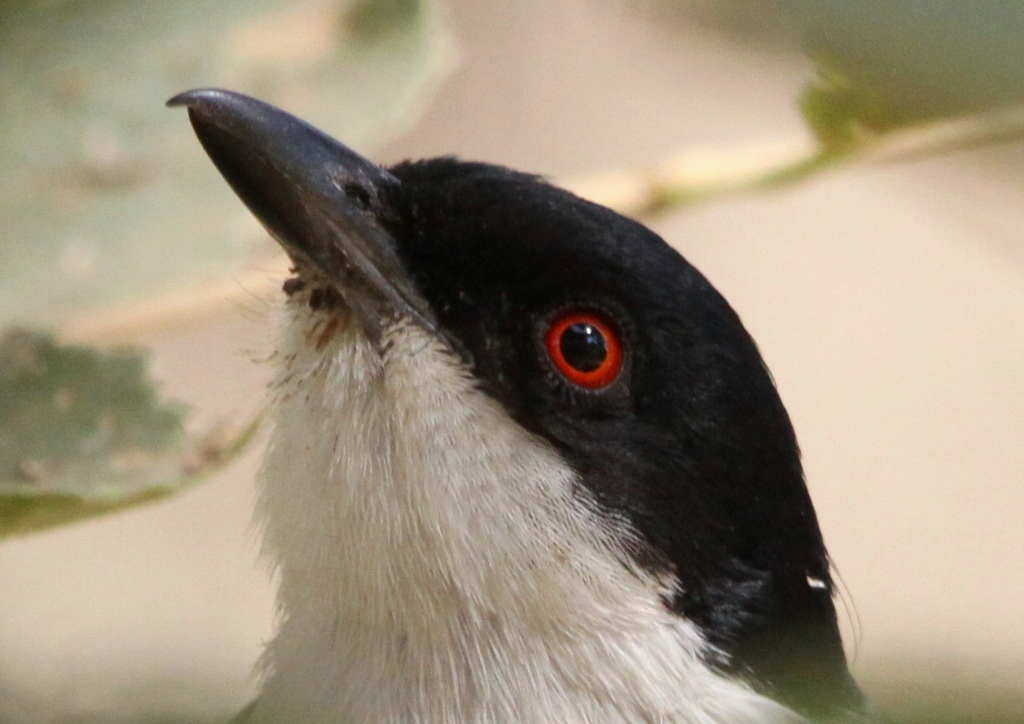
Head of male, D. cubla, showing red iris

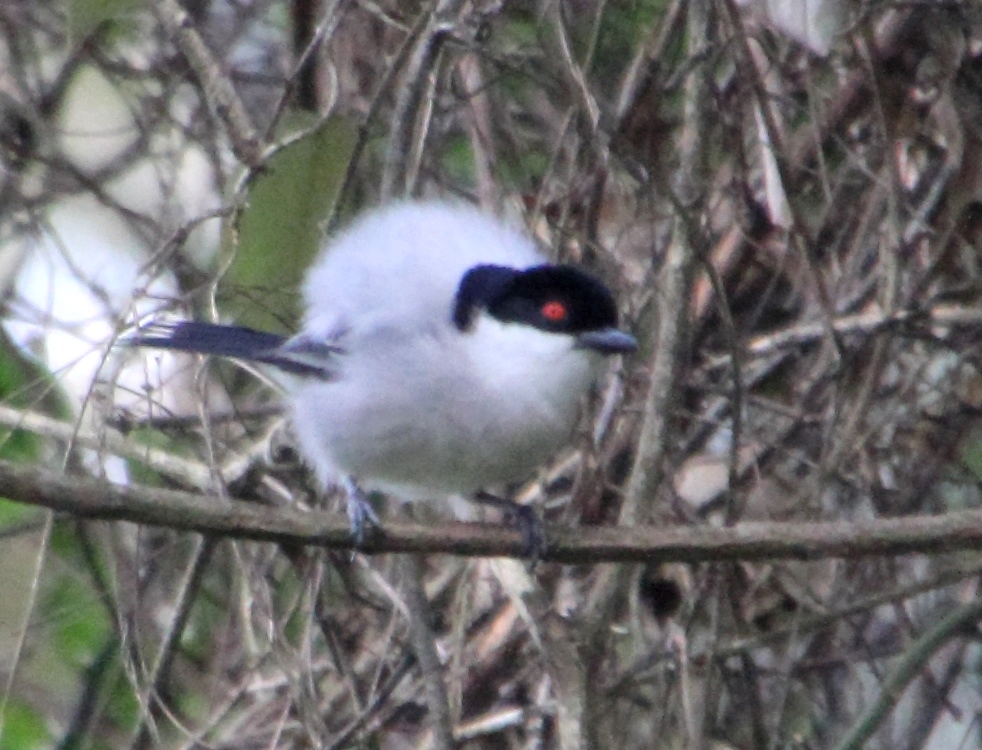
Displaying male, D. cubla, with raised back and rump feathers

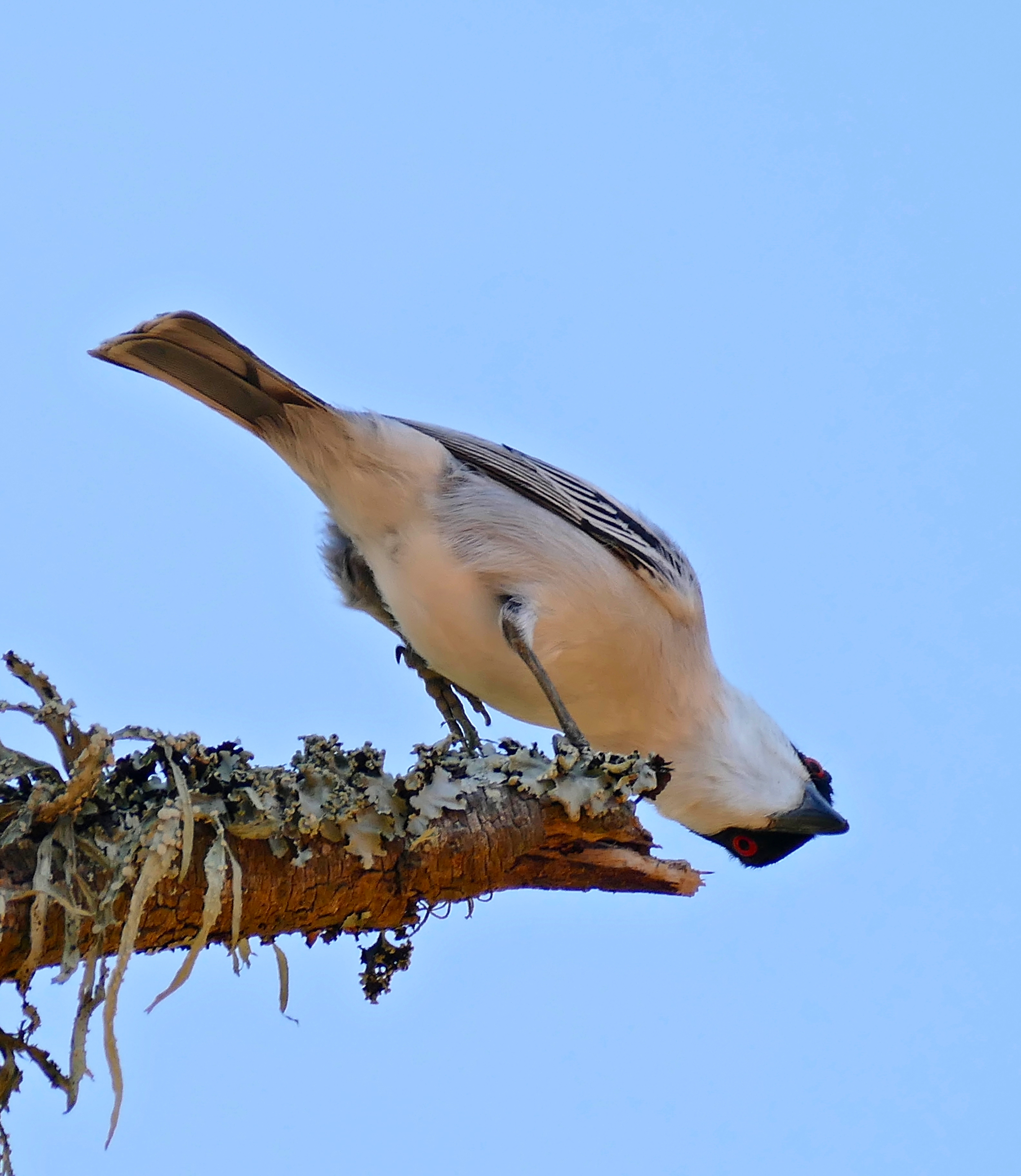
Tit-like foraging habit of male D. cubla

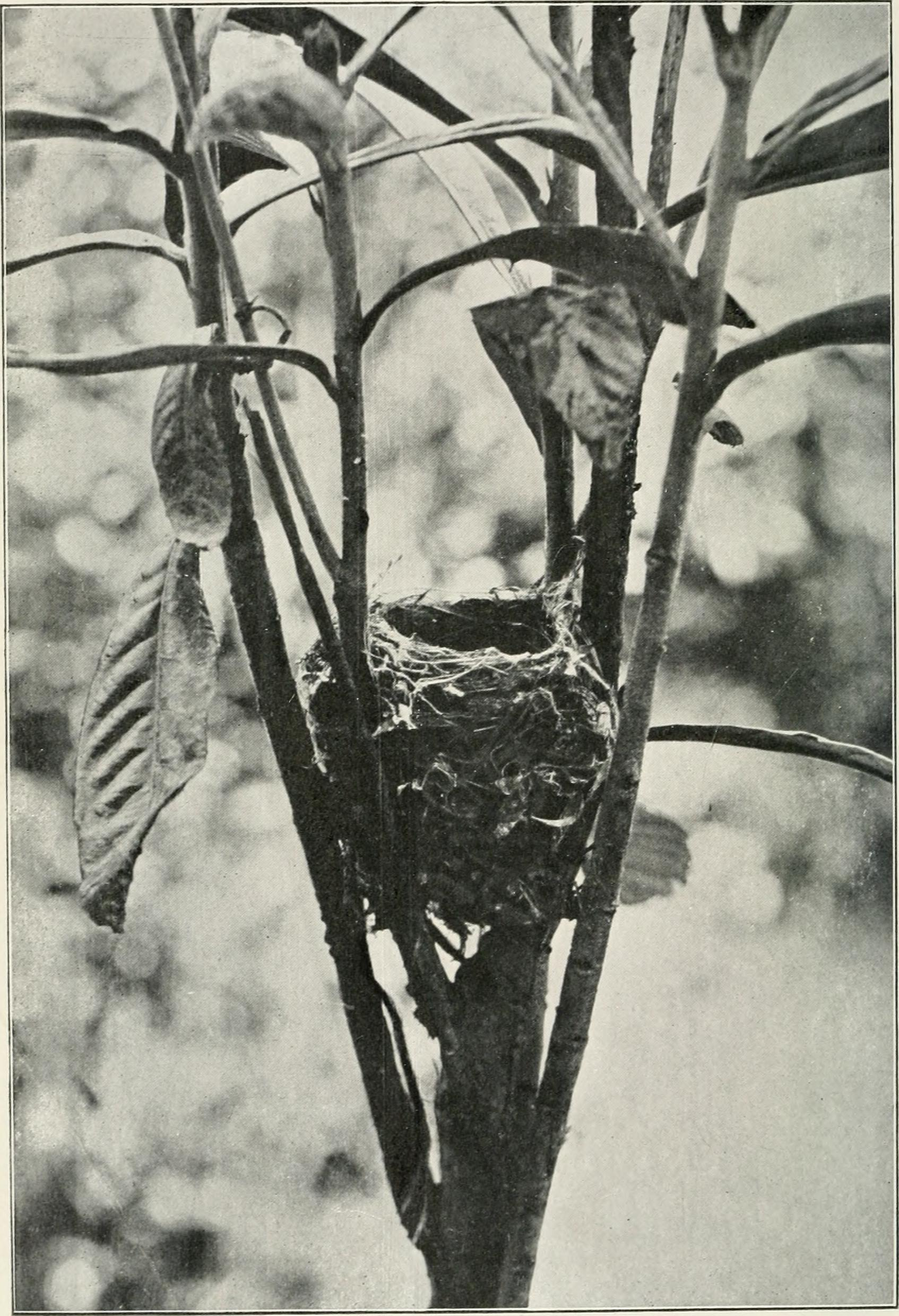
Nest of D. cubla wedged in branches of a sapling
