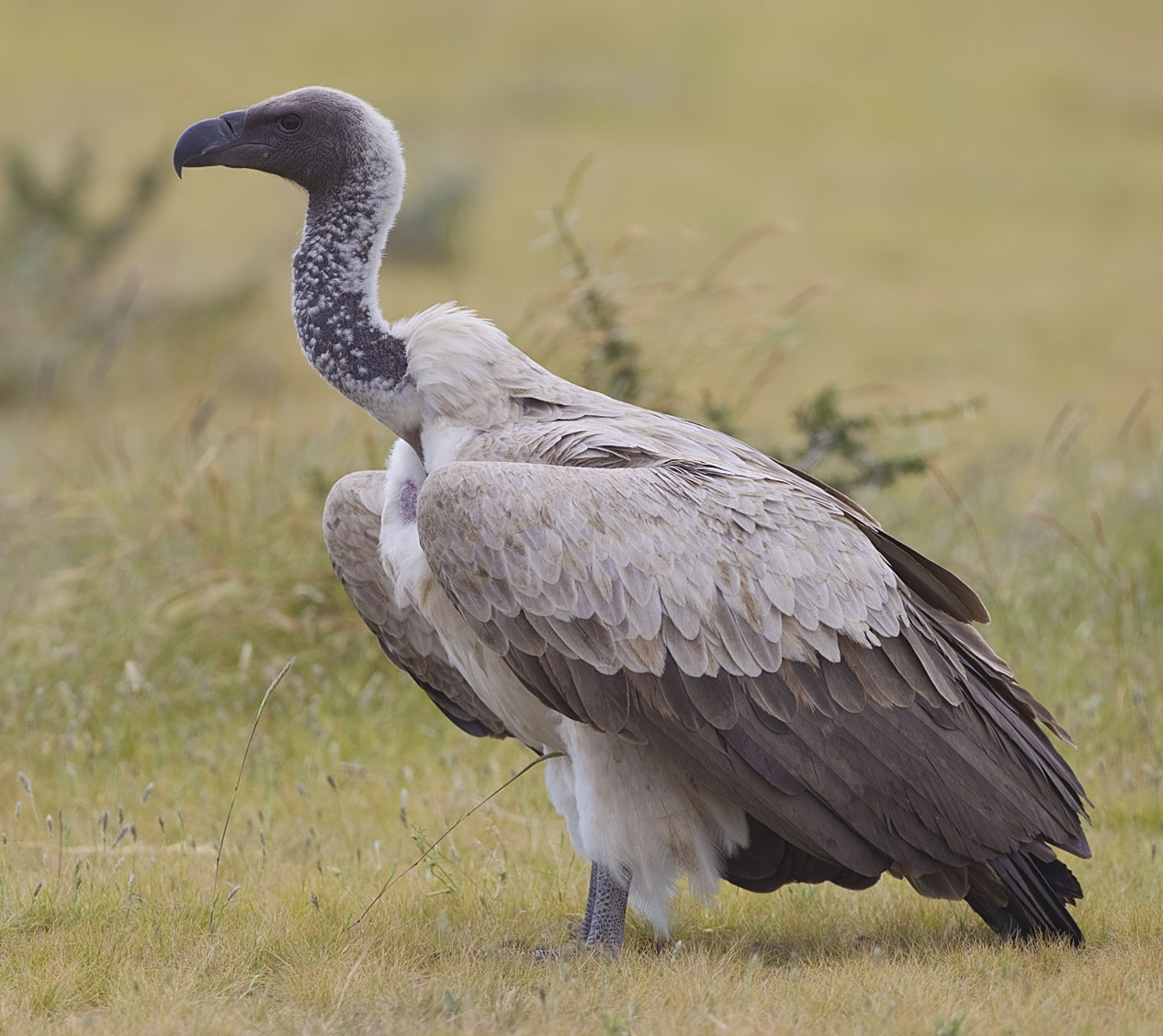
- in Etosha National Park
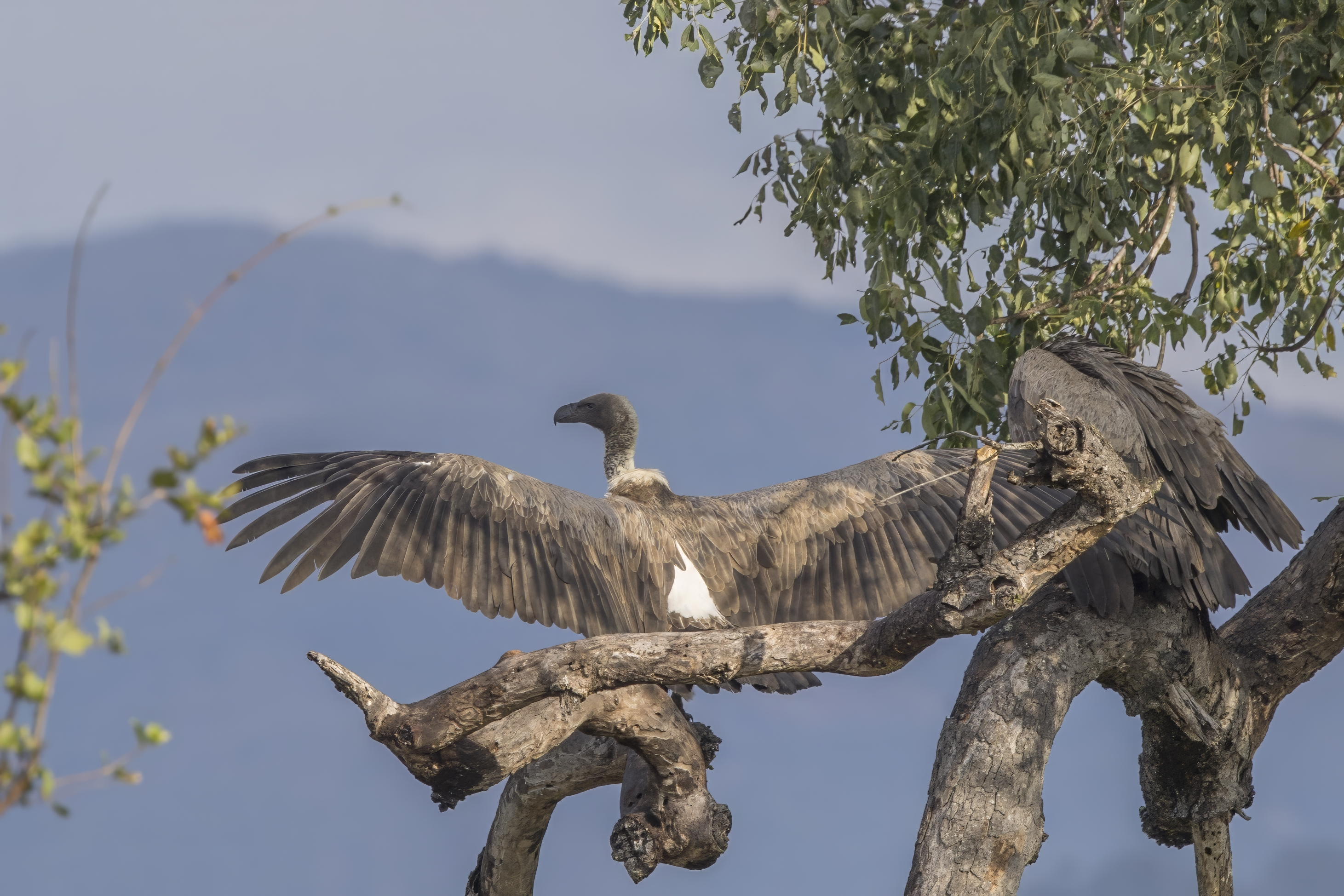
- showing white back in Kruger National Park

Conservation status
- Critically Endangered (IUCN 3.1)
- CITES Appendix II

Scientific classification
- Kingdom: Animalia
- Phylum: Chordata
- Class: Aves
- Order: Accipitriformes
- Family: Accipitridae
- Genus: Gyps
- Species: G. africanus

Binomial name
- Gyps africanus Salvadori, 1865
- Extant (resident) Extant (non-breeding) Possibly extant (resident) Possibly extinct Extinct

= White-backed vulture =

Species of bird

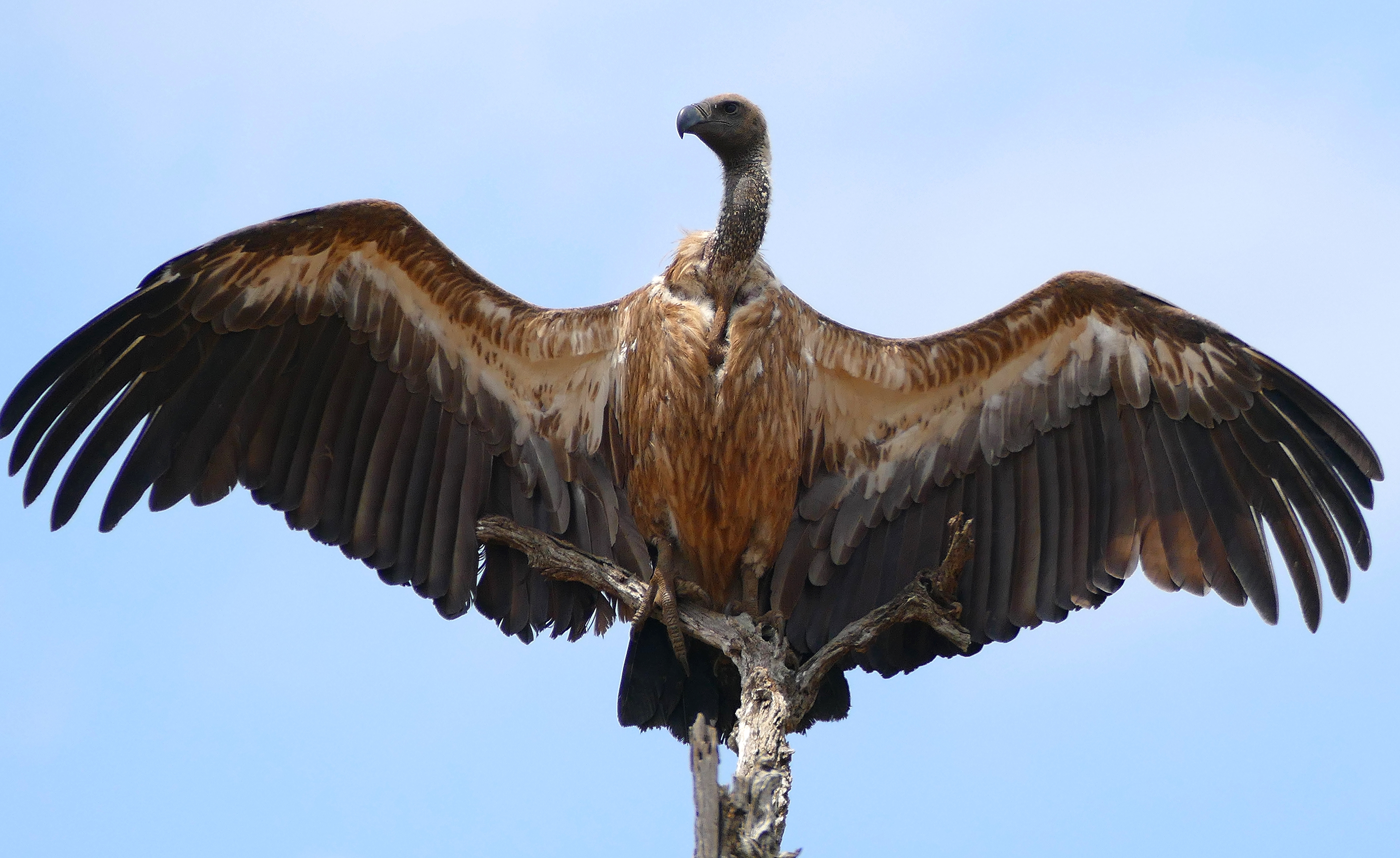
in Kruger National Park

The white-backed vulture (Gyps africanus) is an Old World vulture in the family Accipitridae, which also includes eagles, kites, buzzards and hawks. It is the most common vulture species in the continent of Africa.

== Description ==
The white-backed vulture is a typical vulture, with only down feathers on the head and neck, very broad wings and short tail feathers. It has a white neck ruff. The adult's whitish back contrasts with the otherwise dark plumage. Juveniles are largely dark. This is a medium-sized vulture; its body mass is 4.2 to 7.2 kg (9.3–15.9 lb), it is 78 to 98 cm (31 to 39 in) long and has a 1.96 to 2.25 m (6 ft 5 in to 7 ft 5 in) wingspan.

== Distribution and habitat ==
The white-backed vulture occurs from Senegal, Gambia and Mali in the west, throughout the Sahel region to Ethiopia and Somalia in the east, through East Africa into Mozambique, Zimbabwe, Botswana, Namibia and South Africa in the south. It is the most widespread and common vulture in Africa with an estimated range of 24,300,000 km^{2} (9,400,000 sq mi), but has undergone rapid population declines in recent years.

== Behaviour and ecology ==
=== Diet and feeding ===
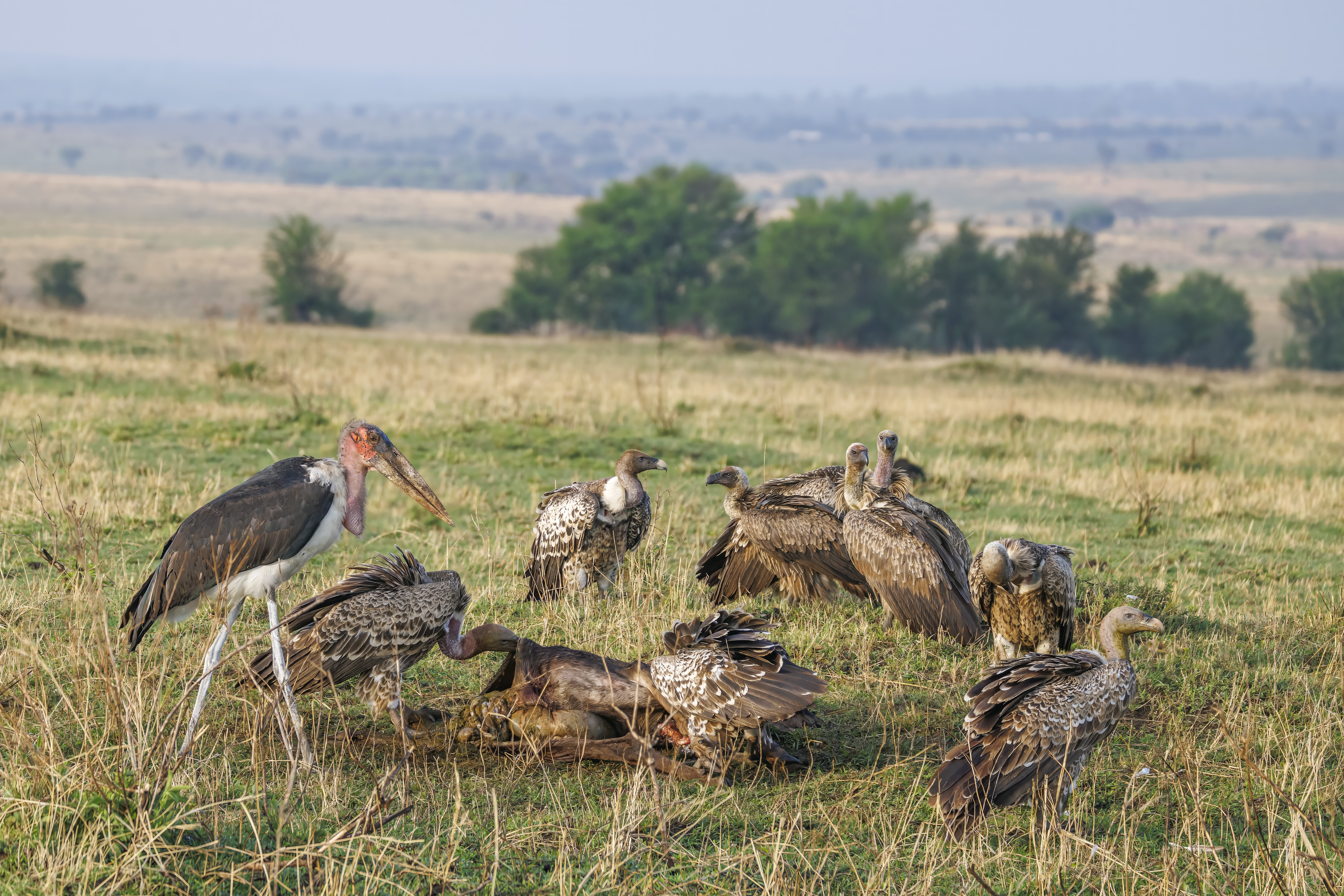
Group feeding on a wildebeest carcass, Tanzania

White-backed vultures are obligate scavengers with a high level of specialization on carrion and bone fragments. Their primary food sources are the carcasses of large, grazing animals found in the wooded savannahs where it lives. This includes warthogs, zebras, gazelles, rhinoceroses, buffalos especially African buffalos, ostriches and even livestock. Their beaks are medium-sized, and not adapted for tearing through tough skin, so they are limited to eating soft tissues, such as the viscera, using a pulling feeding tactic.

White-backed vultures circle through the sky in search of freshly dead animals, often following other scavenger birds and mammalian carnivores to find it. Gyps vultures are considered social vultures which rely heavily on conspecifics to provide information about the position of food and carcasses. The circling flight pattern of vultures is not a signal to other vultures about food, contrary to popular belief. Such signaling could increase competition around limited resources, so vultures instead rely on both personal and social cues to locate carcasses while balancing the risk of competition through selective use of social information in flight decisions.

White-backed vultures feed in groups and are often one of the first vulture species to arrive at a carcass.

=== Breeding ===
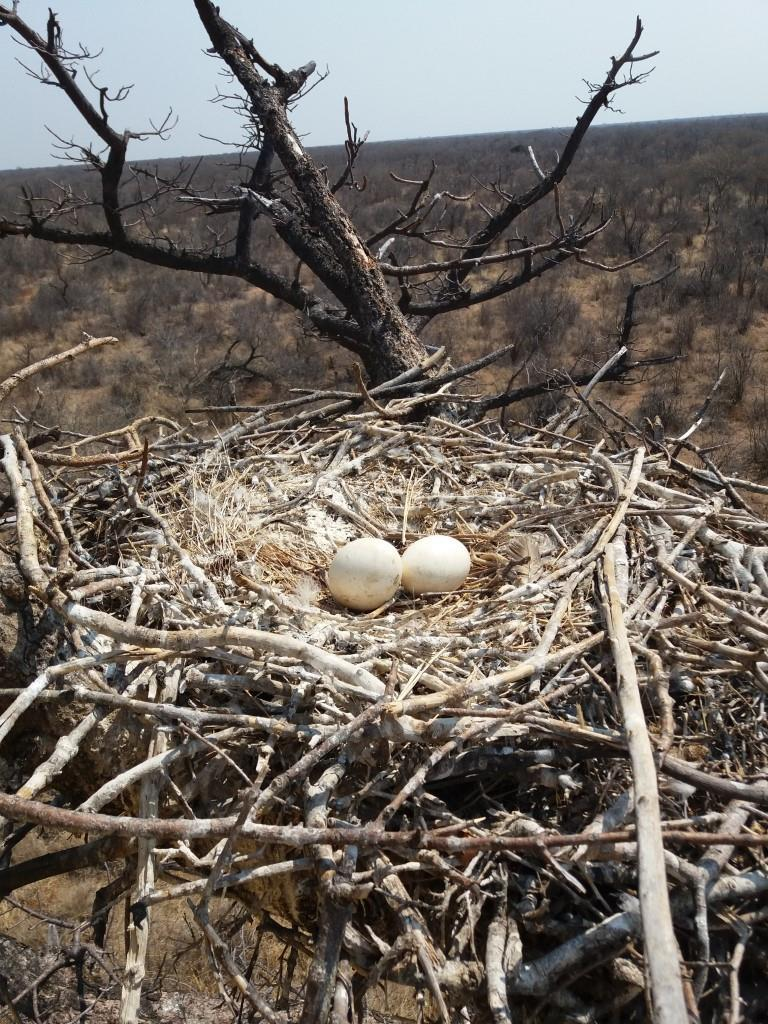
White-backed Vulture eggs in a nest in Atherstone Nature Reserve

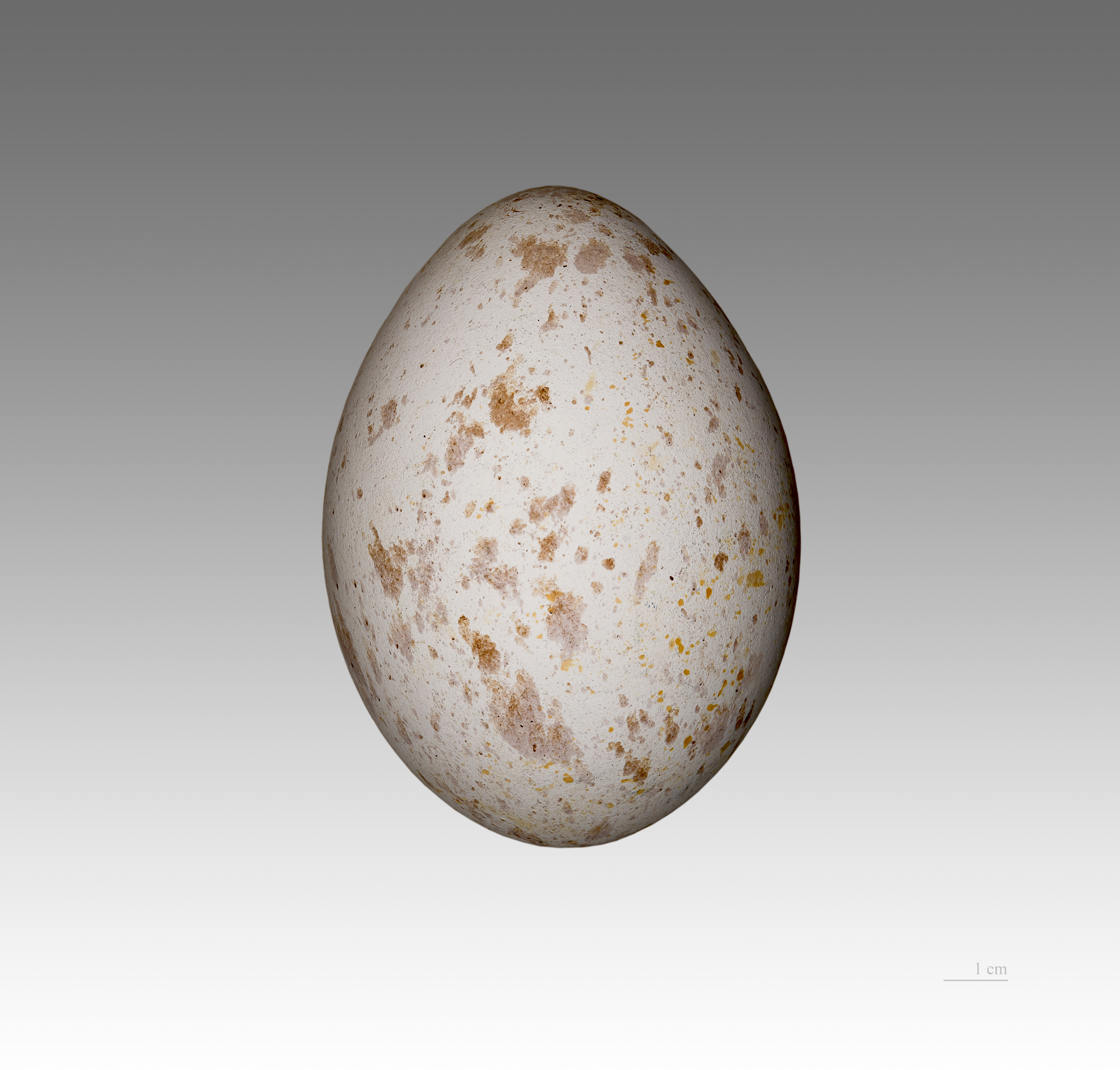
Egg

White-backed vultures nest in trees. They typically choose tall trees along riparian habitats and show a strong preference for Acacia species. The nests are large, around 1m in diameter, and are made of large sticks and lined with leaves and grasses.

A study which monitored 32 African white-backed vulture nests in the Masai Mara National Reserve during the period 2003 to 2007 showed that the mean nesting success was 59%. Another long-term study conducted in Linyanti, Botswana found that there were rapid declines in nesting numbers during a 10 year period. In 2007, there were 73 breeding pairs nesting in the area with a minimum density of 14.9 nests per 100 square kilometers. By 2017, this declined to 22 breeding pairs nesting and 4.49 nests per 100 square kilometers. In addition to a decrease in the number of active nests in the area, breeding success declined from 62% in 2006 to 37% in 2017.

White-backed vultures face threats from habitat degradation and poaching; as such they have been shown to avoid anthropogenically-disturbed areas when selecting nest sites and protection status is also a strong determinant of site selection.

White-backed vultures have a long breeding cycle. The incubation period is around 8 weeks and the nestling period is about 4–5 months.

=== Health ===
The tick Argas theilerae (also known as Theiler's African White-backed vulture argasid) is a parasite of the White-backed vulture.

== Conservation ==
The white-backed vulture has suffered a rapid decline. When it was first assessed in 1988 it was classified as a Least concern species owing to a large range and population. It was reassessed from a Least Concern to Near Threatened species in the 2007 IUCN Red List after the beginnings of a major decline were noticed. In 2012, more information was available about population trends, and the estimates suggested that within the next three generations the white-backed vulture would decrease by 50%. Consequently it was added to the list of Endangered species. In October 2015, it was further uplisted to Critically Endangered because the decline had reached a magnitude that put the vulture at an extreme risk of extinction. A study in 2024 showed that the white-backed vulture population had fallen by 86%.

Studies have also been performed on the white-backed vulture and some species of Asian vultures within the Gyps clade to see the effect of veterinary diclofenac. Regardless of whether the vultures were given an oral or intravenous dose of the substance, the effects were nearly identical and the diclofenac eventually poisoned the subjects.

Another reason for the decline in the number of white-backed vultures is the decrease in the number of their nesting sites, which they construct in trees in savannah areas and which are roughly 1 meter in diameter. There is an inverse relationship between the amount of human activity (farming, ranching, etc.) and the amount of vulture nesting activity in said area, so as the amount of human activity in Africa expands, the number of nesting sites available decreases, putting the vultures in jeopardy. A contributing factor are broader changes in vegetation composition, such as woody plant encroachment, which can decrease hunting efficiency due to limited visibility.

On 20 June 2019, the corpses of 468 white-backed vultures, 17 white-headed vultures, 28 hooded vultures, 14 lappet-faced vultures and 10 cape vultures, altogether 537 vultures, besides 2 tawny eagles, were found in northern Botswana. It is suspected that they died after eating the corpses of 3 elephants that were poisoned by poachers, possibly to avoid detection by the birds, which help rangers to track poaching activity by circling above where there are dead animals. Most of them were new parents, leaving their young orphaned and "ill-equipped" for survival. Vultures are slow breeders, and losing over 400 in a week is a devastating blow for the species.
