= List of birds of South Africa =

Bird species found in continental and nearshore land and waters

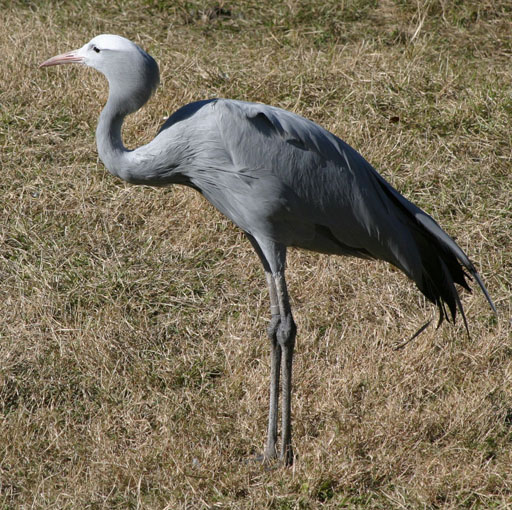
The blue crane is the national bird of South Africa.

South Africa is a large country, ranked 25th by size in the world, and is situated in the temperate latitudes and subtropics. Due to a range of climate types present, a patchwork of unique habitat types occur, which contribute to its biodiversity and level of endemism. This list incorporates the mainland and nearshore islands and waters only. The submerged though ecologically important Agulhas Bank is for most part inside its territorial waters. Offshore, South Africa's territory includes the Prince Edward Islands in the Subantarctic Indian Ocean.

This list's taxonomic treatment (designation and sequence of orders, families and species) and nomenclature (English and scientific names) are those of The Clements Checklist of Birds of the World, 2022 edition, except that South African spelling is used. Taxonomic changes are on-going. As more research is gathered from studies of distribution, behaviour and DNA, the order and number of families and species may change. Furthermore, different approaches to ornithological nomenclature have led to concurrent systems of classification (see Sibley-Ahlquist taxonomy and IOU taxonomy).

Unless otherwise noted, the list is that of BirdLife South Africa (BLSA). Notes in the status column are also from this source. Notes of population status, such as "endangered", refer to the worldwide population, not the South African part of it except for endemics. Unless otherwise noted in the "status" column, the species is a resident or regularly-occurring migrant.

- "Vagrant" means the species rarely or accidentally occurs in South Africa.
- "Endemic" means the species is found only in South Africa.
- "SLE endemic" means the species is found only in South Africa and the Kingdoms of Lesotho and Eswatini (formerly Swaziland). Lesotho is surrounded by South Africa and Eswatini nearly so.

This list contains 879 species according to the Clements taxonomy. The BLSA list includes additional entries as species which Clements considers subspecies; some of them are noted. According to BLSA, 18 species are endemic, 20 are SLE endemic, and 11 have been introduced by humans. Clements describes only 15 as endemic and 14 as SLE endemic.

== Ostriches ==
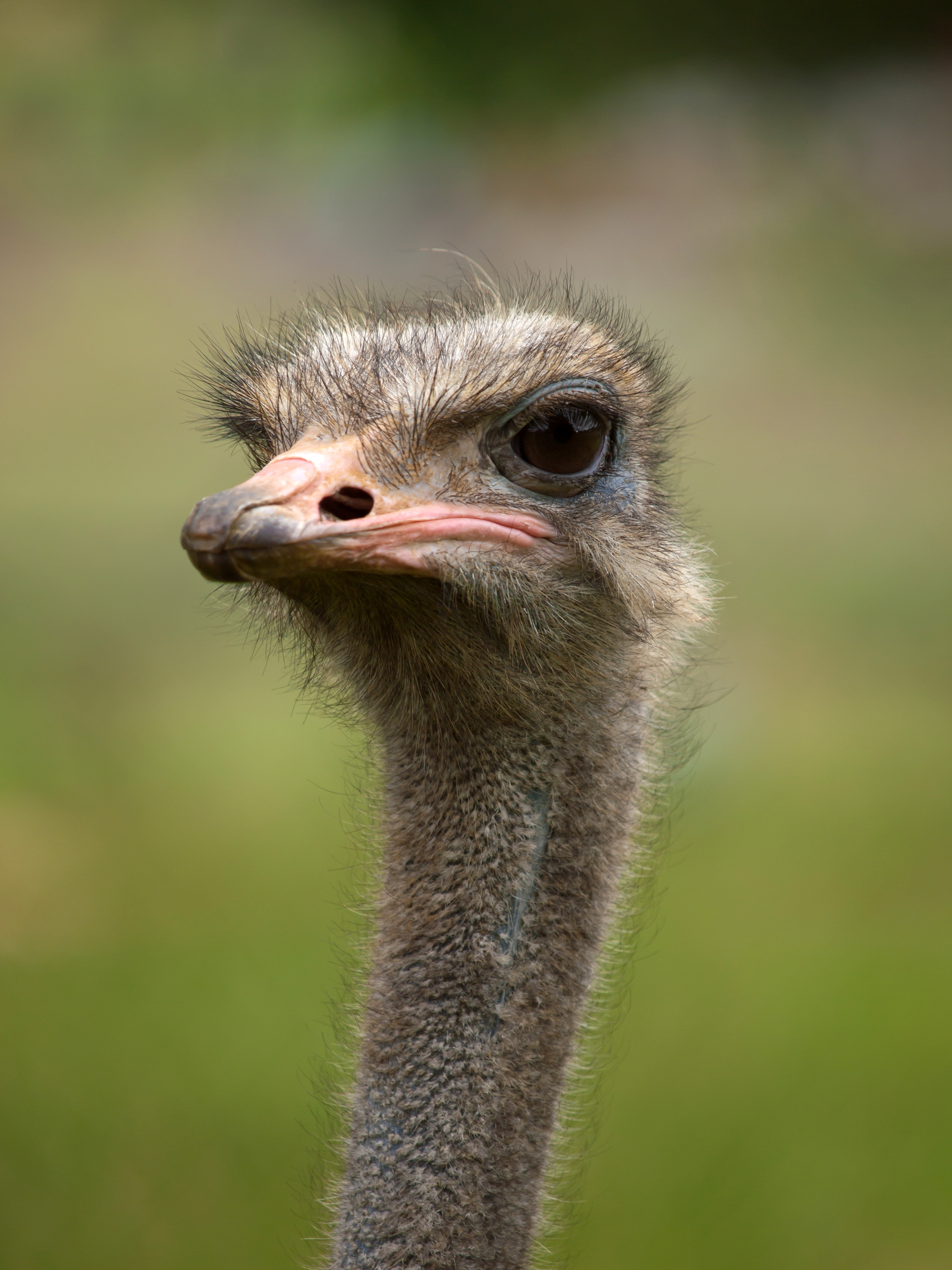
Common ostrich

Order: Struthioniformes Family: Struthionidae

Ostriches are flightless birds native to Africa. They are the largest living species of bird. They are distinctive in appearance, with a long neck and legs and the ability to run at high speeds.

Common name	Binomial	Status
Common ostrich (South African ostrich)	Struthio camelus (S. c. australis)	

== Ducks, geese, and waterfowl ==
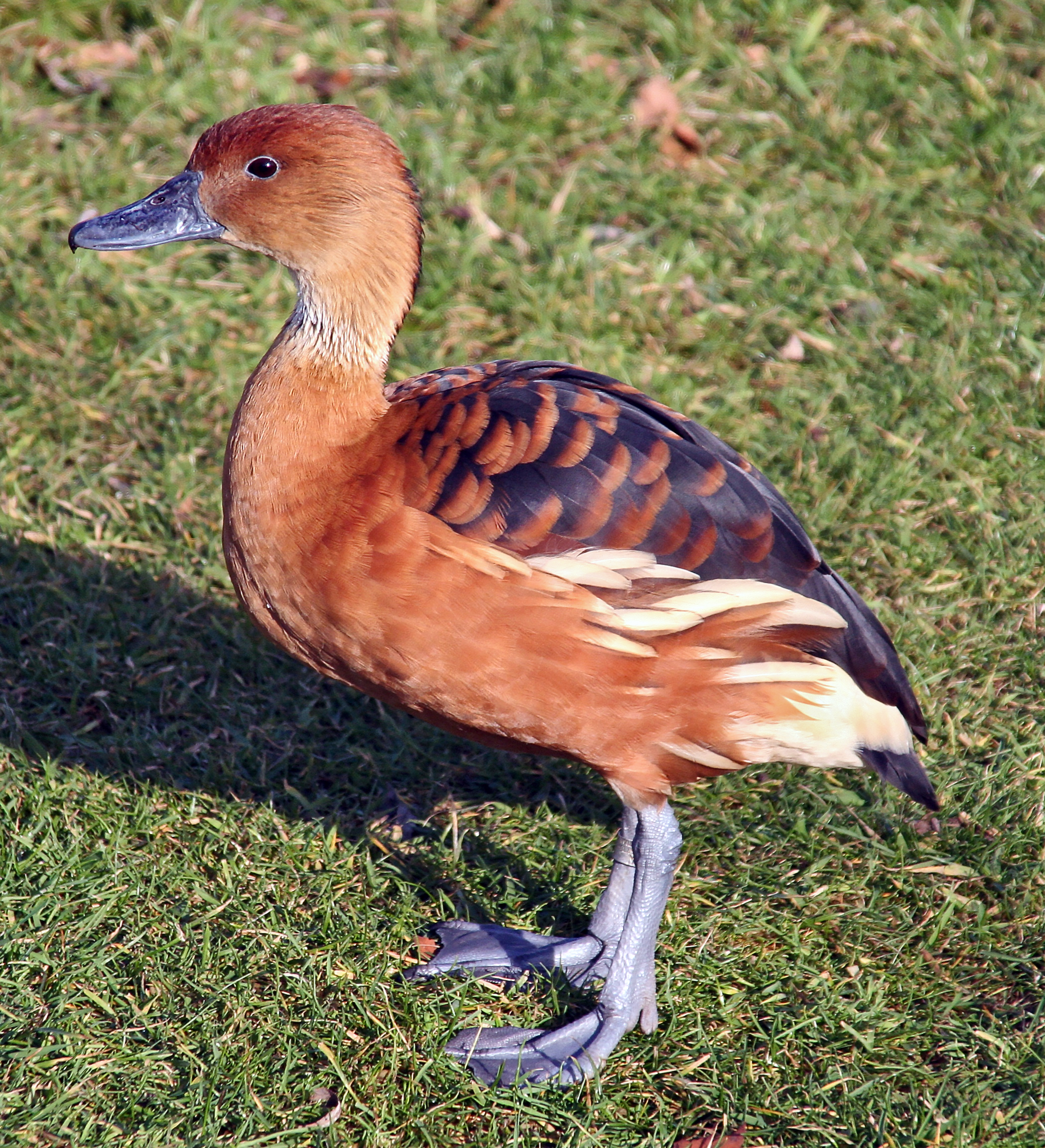
Fulvous whistling-duck

Order: Anseriformes Family: Anatidae

The family Anatidae includes the ducks and most duck-like waterfowl, such as geese and swans. These are birds adapted to an aquatic existence, with webbed feet, flattened bills, and feathers that are excellent at shedding water due to an oily coating.

Common name	Binomial	Status
White-faced whistling-duck	Dendrocygna viduata	
Fulvous whistling-duck	Dendrocygna bicolor	
White-backed duck	Thalassornis leuconotus	
Mute swan	Cygnus olor	Introduced
Knob-billed duck	Sarkidiornis melanotos	
Egyptian goose	Alopochen aegyptiaca	
South African shelduck	Tadorna cana	
Spur-winged goose	Plectropterus gambensis	
African pygmy-goose	Nettapus auritus	
Garganey	Spatula querquedula	Vagrant
Blue-billed teal	Spatula hottentota	
Cape shoveler	Spatula smithii	
Northern shoveler	Spatula clypeata	Vagrant
African black duck	Anas sparsa	
Yellow-billed duck	Anas undulata	
Mallard	Anas platyrhynchos	Introduced
Cape teal	Anas capensis	
Red-billed duck	Anas erythrorhyncha	
Northern pintail	Anas acuta	Vagrant
Southern pochard	Netta erythrophthalma	
Maccoa duck	Oxyura maccoa	Vulnerable

== Guineafowl ==
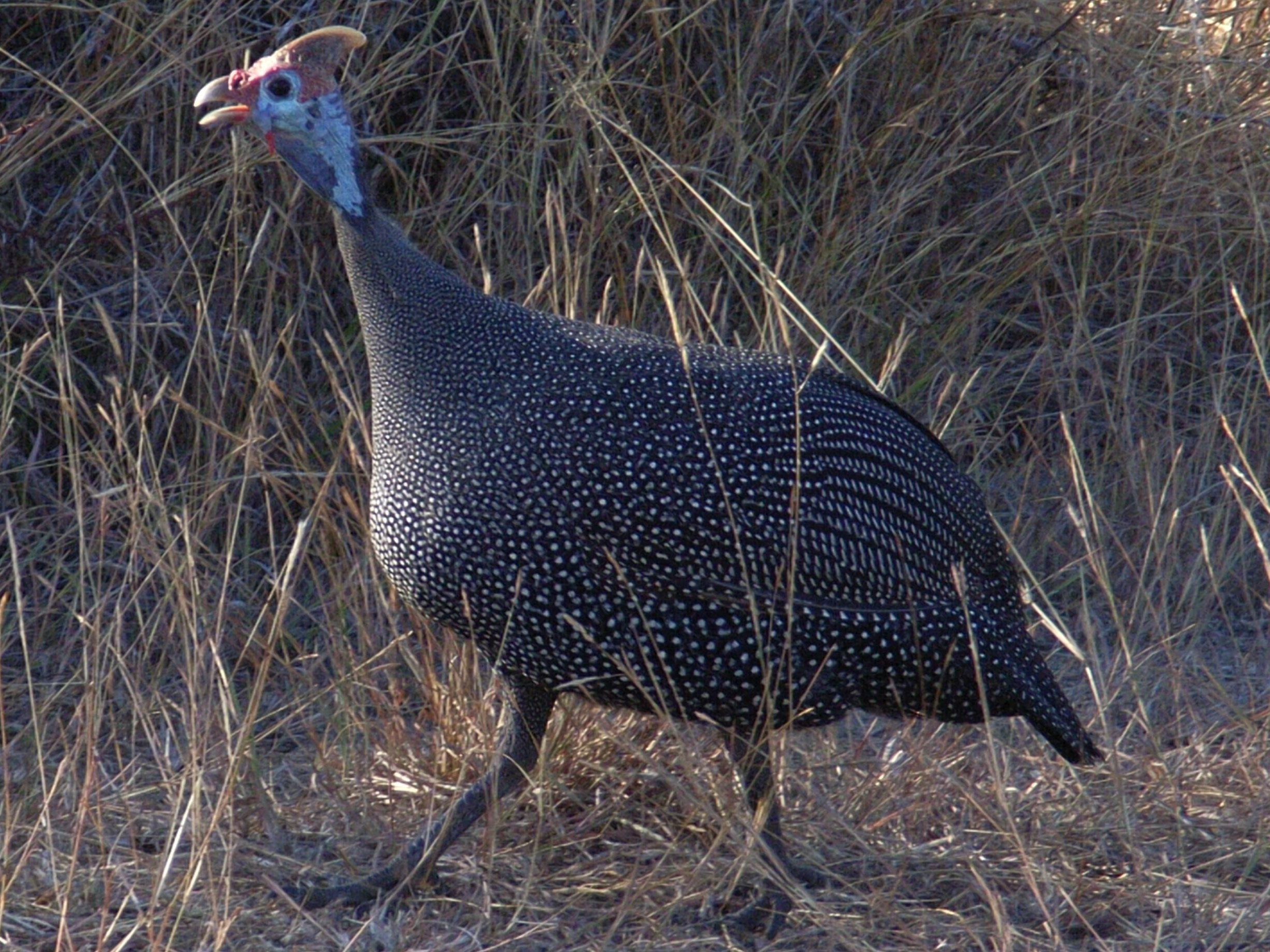
Helmeted guineafowl

Order: Galliformes Family: Numididae

The guineafowl are a family of birds native to Africa. They typically eat insects and seeds, are ground-nesting, and resemble partridges, except with featherless heads.

Common name	Binomial	Status
Helmeted guineafowl	Numida meleagris	
Southern crested guineafowl	Guttera edouardi	

== Pheasants, grouse, and allies ==
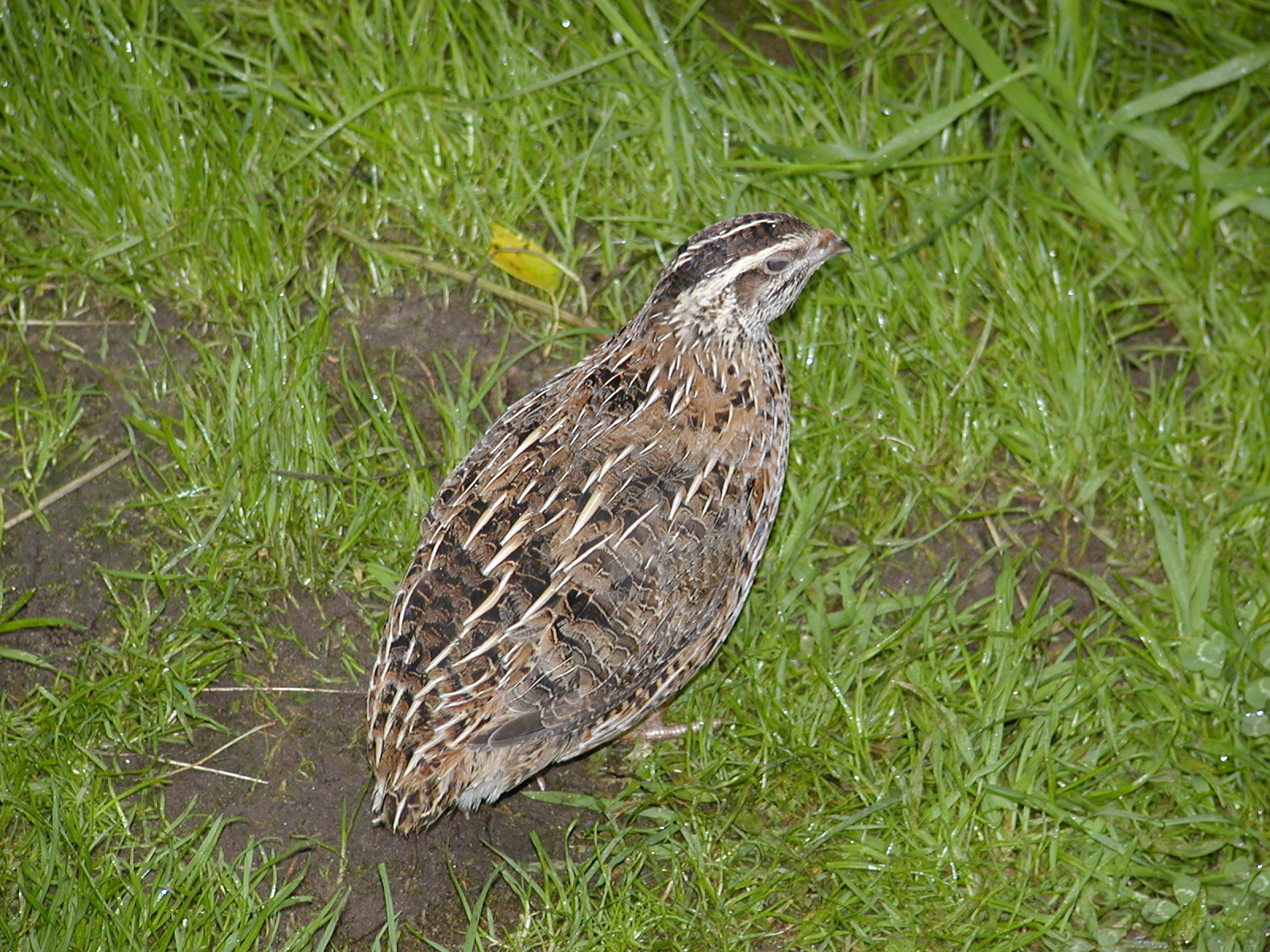
Common quail

Order: Galliformes Family: Phasianidae

The Phasianidae are a family of terrestrial birds consisting of quails, partridges, snowcocks, francolins, spurfowls, tragopans, monals, pheasants, peafowl, and jungle fowls. In general, they are plump and have broad, relatively short wings.

Common name	Binomial	Status
Indian peafowl	Pavo cristatus	Introduced
Crested francolin	Ortygornis sephaena	
Coqui francolin	Campocolinus coqui	
Red-winged francolin	Scleroptila levaillantii	
Grey-winged francolin	Scleroptila africanus	SLE endemic
Orange River francolin	Scleroptila gutturalis	
Shelley's francolin	Scleroptila shelleyi	
Blue quail	Synoicus adansonii	Vagrant
Common quail	Coturnix coturnix	
Harlequin quail	Coturnix delegorguei	
Chukar	Alectoris chukar	Introduced
Red-billed francolin	Pternistis adspersus	
Cape francolin	Pternistis capensis	See note (Note: Clements lists this species as endemic)
Natal francolin	Pternistis natalensis	
Swainson's francolin	Pternistis swainsonii	
Red-necked francolin	Pternistis afer	

== Flamingos ==
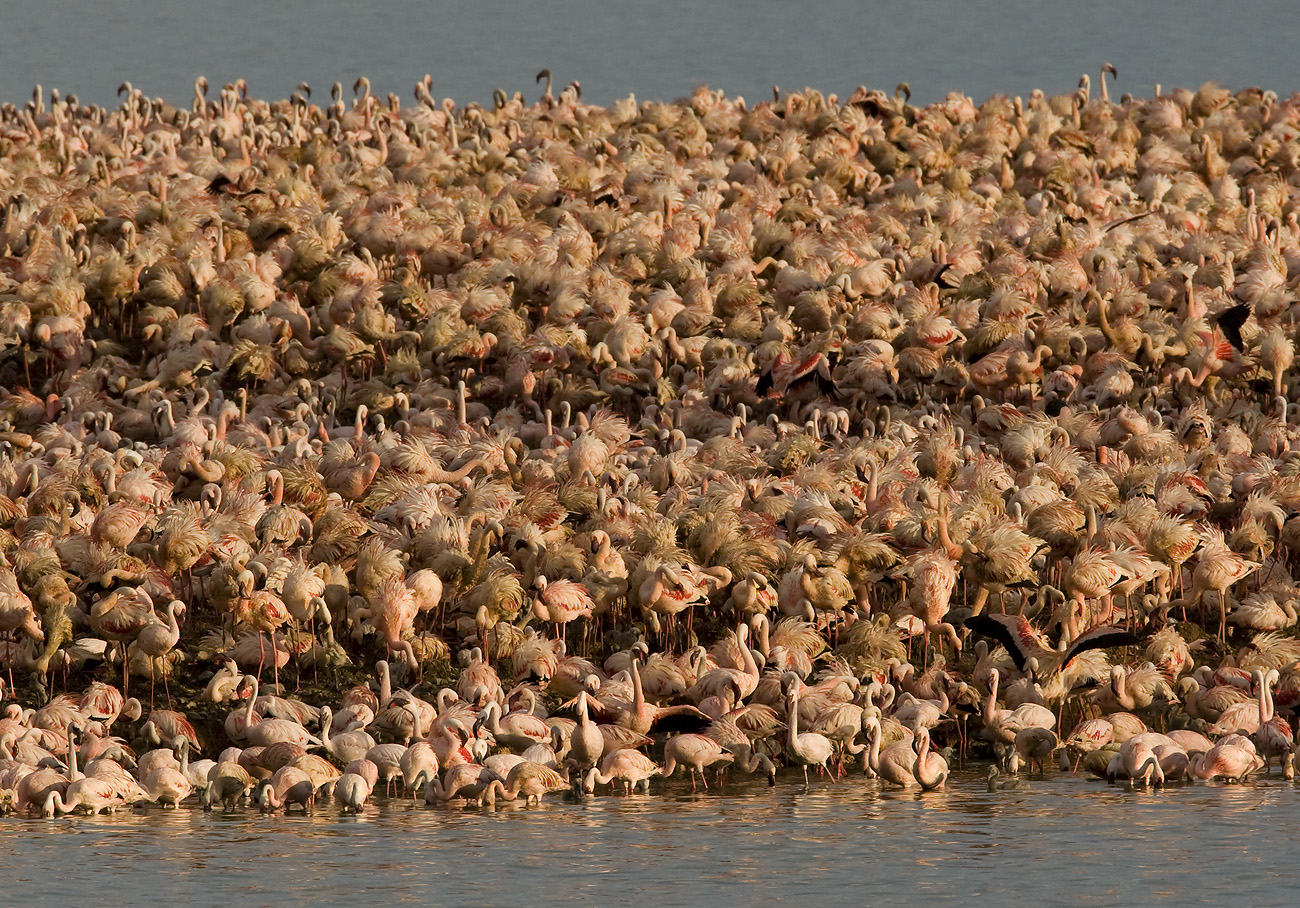
Lesser flamingos

Order: Phoenicopteriformes Family: Phoenicopteridae

Flamingos are large gregarious wading birds found in both the Western and Eastern Hemispheres. Flamingos filter-feed on shellfish and algae. Their oddly shaped beaks are specially adapted to separate mud and silt from the food they consume and, uniquely, are used upside-down.

Common name	Binomial	Status
Greater flamingo	Phoenicopterus roseus	
Lesser flamingo	Phoeniconaias minor	Near threatened

== Grebes ==
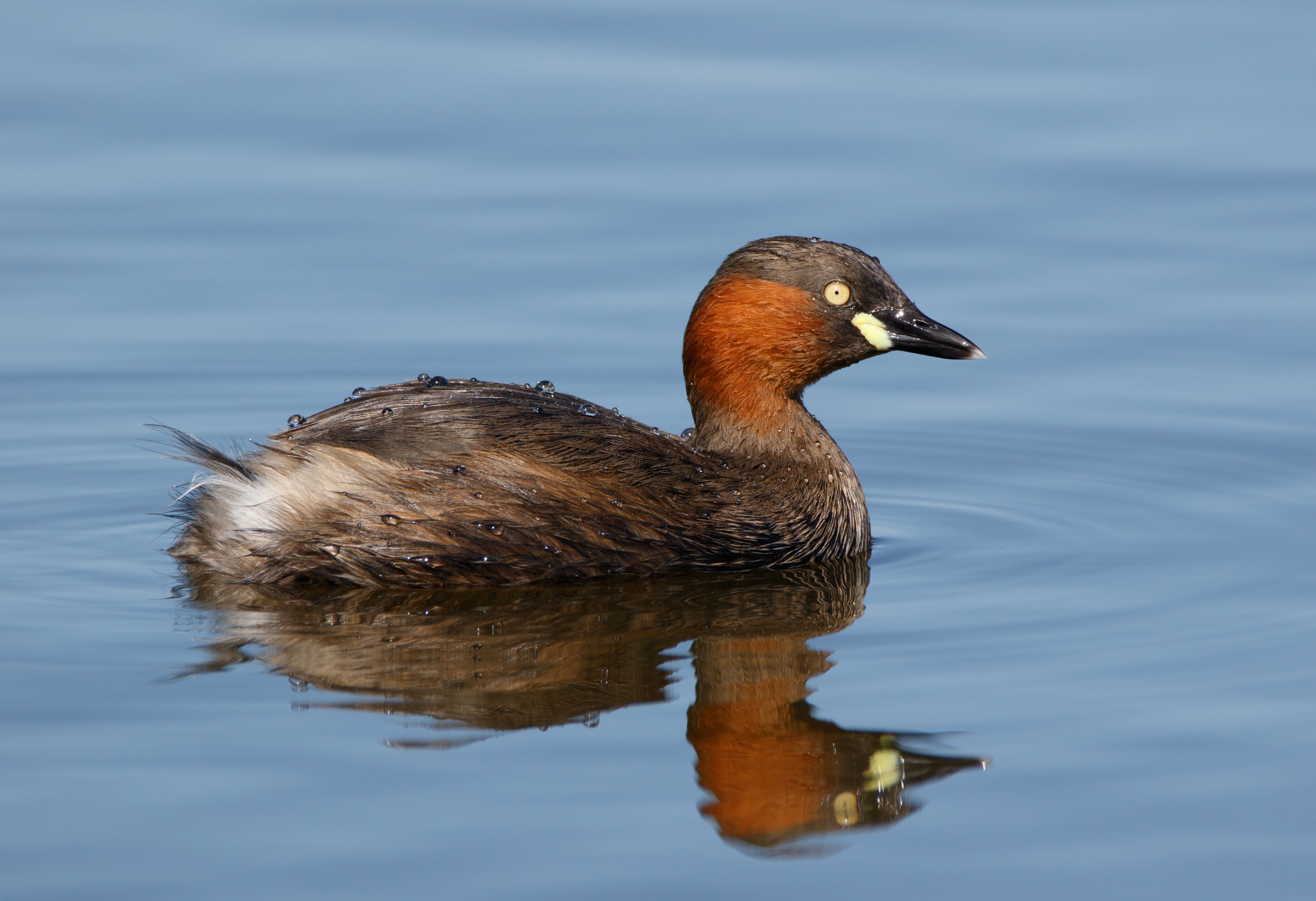
Little grebe

Order: Podicipediformes Family: Podicipedidae

Grebes are small to medium-large freshwater diving birds. They have lobed toes and are excellent swimmers and divers. However, they have their feet placed far back on the body, making them quite ungainly on land.

Common name	Binomial	Status
Little grebe	Tachybaptus ruficollis	
Great crested grebe	Podiceps cristatus	
Eared grebe	Podiceps nigricollis	

== Pigeons and doves ==
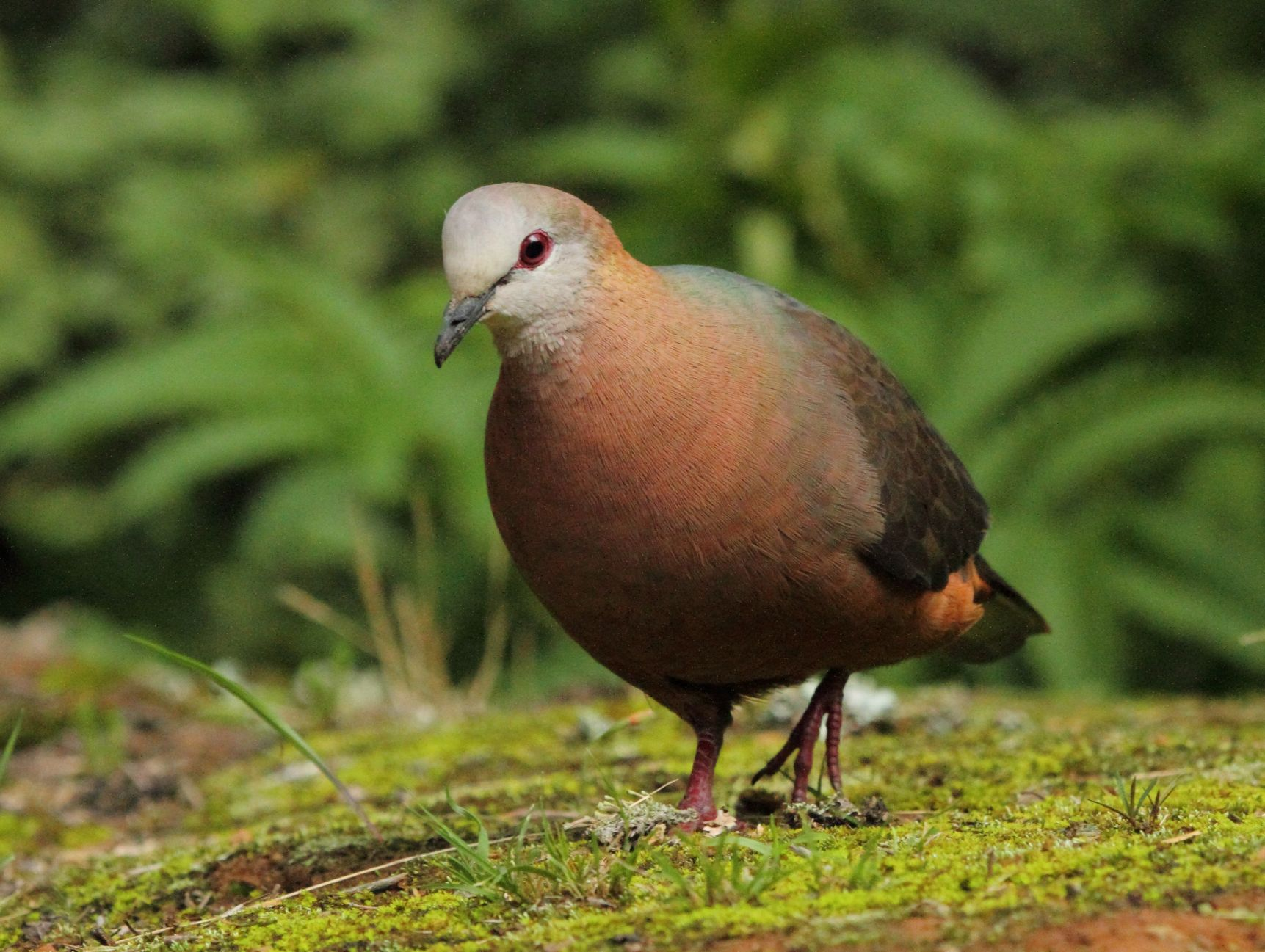
Lemon dove

Order: Columbiformes Family: Columbidae

Pigeons and doves are stout-bodied birds with short necks and short slender bills with a fleshy cere.

Common name	Binomial	Status
Rock pigeon	Columba livia	Introduced
Speckled pigeon	Columba guinea	
Rameron pigeon	Columba arquatrix	
Delegorgue's pigeon	Columba delegorguei	
Lemon dove	Columba larvata	
European turtle-dove	Streptopelia turtur	Vagrant; vulnerable
Mourning collared-dove	Streptopelia decipiens	
Red-eyed dove	Streptopelia semitorquata	
Ring-necked dove	Streptopelia capicola	
Laughing dove	Streptopelia senegalensis	
Emerald-spotted wood-dove	Turtur chalcospilos	
Blue-spotted wood-dove	Turtur afer	
Tambourine dove	Turtur tympanistria	
Namaqua dove	Oena capensis	
African green-pigeon	Treron calvus	

== Sandgrouse ==
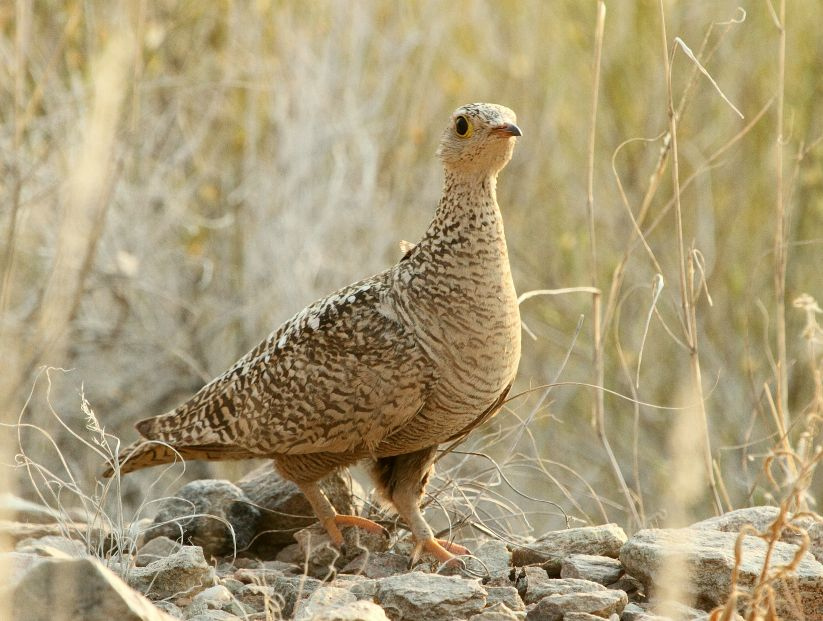
Female double-banded sandgrouse

Order: Pterocliformes Family: Pteroclidae

Sandgrouse have small, pigeon-like heads and necks, but sturdy compact bodies. They have long pointed wings and sometimes tails and a fast direct flight. Flocks fly to watering holes at dawn and dusk. Their legs are feathered down to the toes.

Common name	Binomial	Status
Namaqua sandgrouse	Pterocles namaqua	
Yellow-throated sandgrouse	Pterocles gutturalis	
Double-banded sandgrouse	Pterocles bicinctus	
Burchell's sandgrouse	Pterocles burchelli	

== Bustards ==
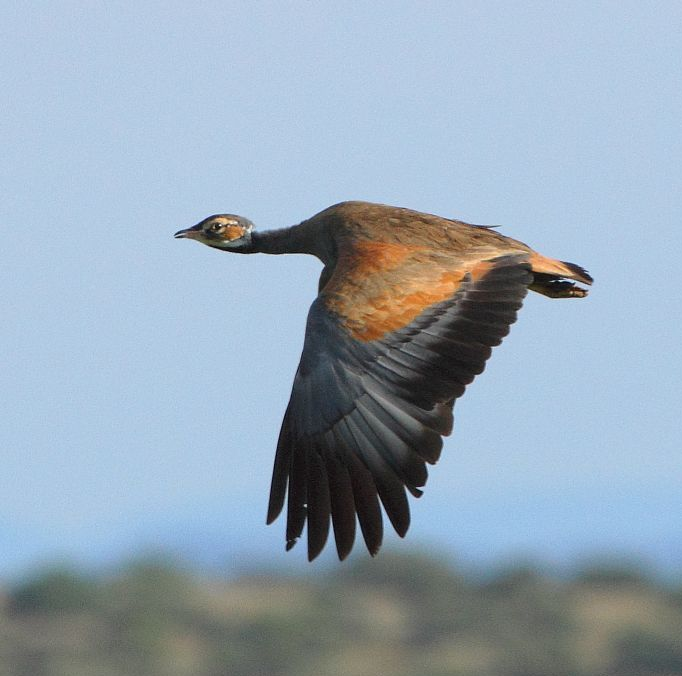
Blue bustard

Order: Otidiformes Family: Otididae

Bustards are large terrestrial birds mainly associated with dry open country and steppes in the Old World. They are omnivorous and nest on the ground. They walk steadily on strong legs and big toes, pecking for food as they go. They have long broad wings with "fingered" wingtips and striking patterns in flight. Many have interesting mating displays.

Common name	Binomial	Status
Kori bustard	Ardeotis kori	Near threatened
Ludwig's bustard	Neotis ludwigii	Endangered
Denham's bustard	Neotis denhami	Near threatened
White-bellied bustard	Eupodotis senegalensis	
Blue bustard	Eupodotis caerulescens	SLE endemic (see note); (Note: Clements lists this species as endemic to South Africa alone) near threatened
Karoo bustard	Eupodotis vigorsii	
Red-crested bustard	Eupodotis ruficrista	
Black bustard	Eupodoti afra	Endemic; vulnerable
White-quilled bustard	Eupodoti afraoides	
Black-bellied bustard	Lissotis melanogaster	

== Turacos ==
Order: Musophagiformes Family: Musophagidae

The turacos, plantain eaters, and go-away-birds make up the family Musophagidae. They are medium-sized arboreal birds. The turacos and plantain eaters are brightly coloured, usually in blue, green, or purple. The go-away-birds are mostly grey and white.

Common name	Binomial	Status
Livingstone's turaco	Tauraco livingstonii	
Knysna turaco	Tauraco corythaix	SLE endemic
Purple-crested turaco	Tauraco porphyreolophus	
Grey go-away-bird	Corythaixoides concolor	

== Cuckoos ==
Order: Cuculiformes Family: Cuculidae

The family Cuculidae includes cuckoos, roadrunners, and anis. These birds are of variable size with slender bodies, long tails, and strong legs.

Common name	Binomial	Status
Senegal coucal	Centropus senegalensis	Vagrant
White-browed coucal	Centropus superciliosus	
Black coucal	Centropus grillii	
Green malkoha	Ceuthmochares australis	
Great spotted cuckoo	Clamator glandarius	
Levaillant's cuckoo	Clamator levaillantii	
Pied cuckoo	Clamator jacobinus	
Thick-billed cuckoo	Pachycoccyx audeberti	
Dideric cuckoo	Chrysococcyx caprius	
Klaas's cuckoo	Chrysococcyx klaas	
African emerald cuckoo	Chrysococcyx cupreus	
Barred long-tailed cuckoo	Cercococcyx montanus	Vagrant
Black cuckoo	Cuculus clamosus	
Red-chested cuckoo	Cuculus solitarius	
Lesser cuckoo	Cuculus poliocephalus	Vagrant
African cuckoo	Cuculus gularis	
Madagascar cuckoo	Cuculus rochii	Vagrant
Common cuckoo	Cuculus canorus	

== Nightjars and allies ==
Order: Caprimulgiformes Family: Caprimulgidae

Nightjars are medium-sized ground-nesting nocturnal birds with long wings, short legs, and very short bills. Most have small feet, of little use for walking, and long pointed wings. Their soft plumage is camouflaged to resemble bark or leaves.

Common name	Binomial	Status
Pennant-winged nightjar	Caprimulgus vexillarius	
Eurasian nightjar	Caprimulgus europaeus	
Rufous-cheeked nightjar	Caprimulgus rufigena	
Fiery-necked nightjar	Caprimulgus pectoralis	
Swamp nightjar	Caprimulgus natalensis	
Freckled nightjar	Caprimulgus tristigma	
Square-tailed nightjar	Caprimulgus fossii	

== Swifts ==
Order: Caprimulgiformes Family: Apodidae

Swifts are small birds which spend the majority of their lives flying. These birds have very short legs and never settle voluntarily on the ground, perching instead only on vertical surfaces. Many swifts have long swept-back wings which resemble a crescent or boomerang.

Common name	Binomial	Status
Mottled spinetail	Telacanthura ussheri	
Bat-like spinetail	Neafrapus boehmi	
Alpine swift	Apus melba	
Common swift	Apus apus	
African swift	Apus barbatus	
Bradfield's swift	Apus bradfieldi	
Little swift	Apus affinis	
Horus swift	Apus horus	
White-rumped swift	Apus caffer	
African palm-swift	Cypsiurus parvus	

== Flufftails ==
Order: Gruiformes Family: Sarothruridae

The flufftails are a small family of ground-dwelling birds found only in Madagascar and sub-Saharan Africa.

Common name	Binomial	Status
Buff-spotted flufftail	Sarothrura elegans	
Red-chested flufftail	Sarothrura rufa	
Streaky-breasted flufftail	Sarothrura boehmi	Vagrant
Striped flufftail	Sarothrura affinis	
White-winged flufftail	Sarothrura ayresi	Critically endangered

== Rails, gallinules, and coots ==
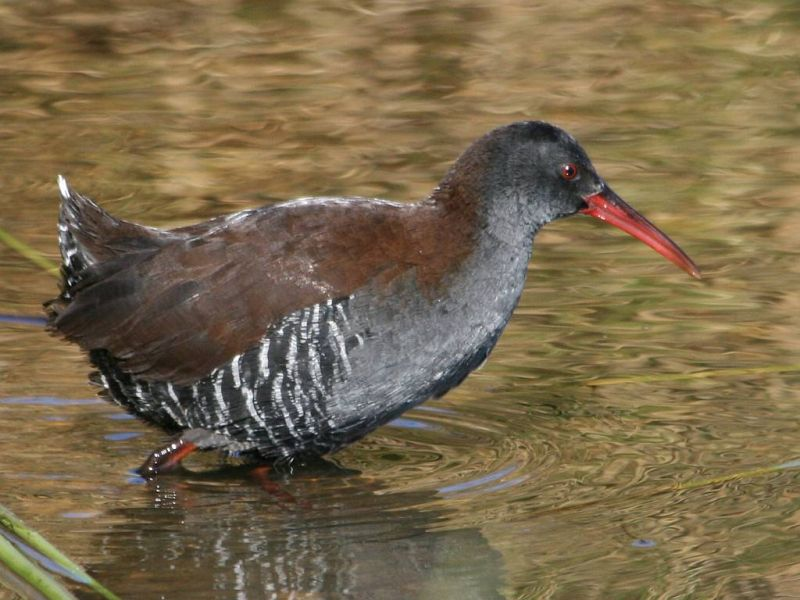
African rail

Order: Gruiformes Family: Rallidae

Rallidae is a large family of small to medium-sized birds which includes the rails, crakes, coots, and gallinules. Typically they inhabit dense vegetation in damp environments near lakes, swamps, or rivers. In general they are shy and secretive birds, making them difficult to observe. Most species have strong legs and long toes which are well adapted to soft uneven surfaces. They tend to have short, rounded wings and to be weak fliers.

Common name	Binomial	Status
African rail	Rallus caerulescens	
Corn crake	Crex crex	
African crake	Crex egregia	
Spotted crake	Porzana porzana	
Lesser moorhen	Paragallinula angulata	
Eurasian moorhen	Gallinula chloropus	
Red-knobbed coot	Fulica cristata	
Allen's gallinule	Porphyrio alleni	
Purple gallinule	Porphyrio martinica	Vagrant
African swamphen	Porphyrio madagascariensis	
Striped crake	Amaurornis marginalis	Vagrant
Black crake	Zapornia flavirostra	
Little crake	Zapornia parva	Vagrant
Baillon's crake	Zapornia pusilla	

== Finfoots ==
Order: Gruiformes Family: Heliornithidae

Heliornithidae is a small family of tropical birds with webbed lobes on their feet similar to those of grebes and coots.

Common name	Binomial	Status
African finfoot	Podica senegalensis	

== Cranes ==
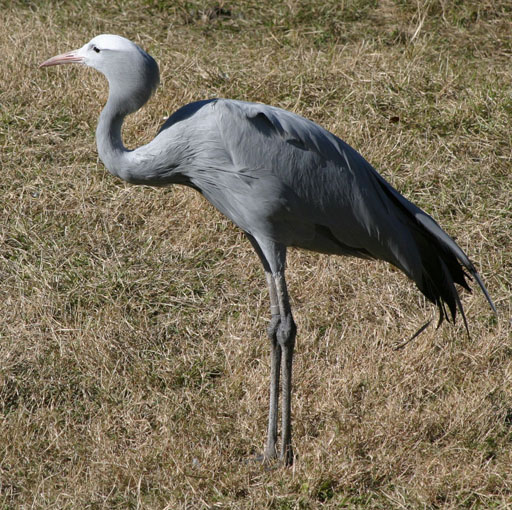
Blue crane

Order: Gruiformes Family: Gruidae

Cranes are large, long-legged, and long-necked birds. Unlike the similar-looking but unrelated herons, cranes fly with necks outstretched, not pulled back. Most have elaborate and noisy courting displays or "dances".

Common name	Binomial	Status
Grey crowned-crane	Balearica regulorum	Endangered
Blue crane	Anthropoides paradiseus	Vulnerable
Wattled crane	Bugeranus carunculatus	Vulnerable

== Sheathbills ==
Order: Charadriiformes Family: Chionidae

The two species in this family breed on Antarctica and islands near that continent.

Common name	Binomial	Status
Snowy sheathbill	Chionis alba	Vagrant

== Thick-knees ==
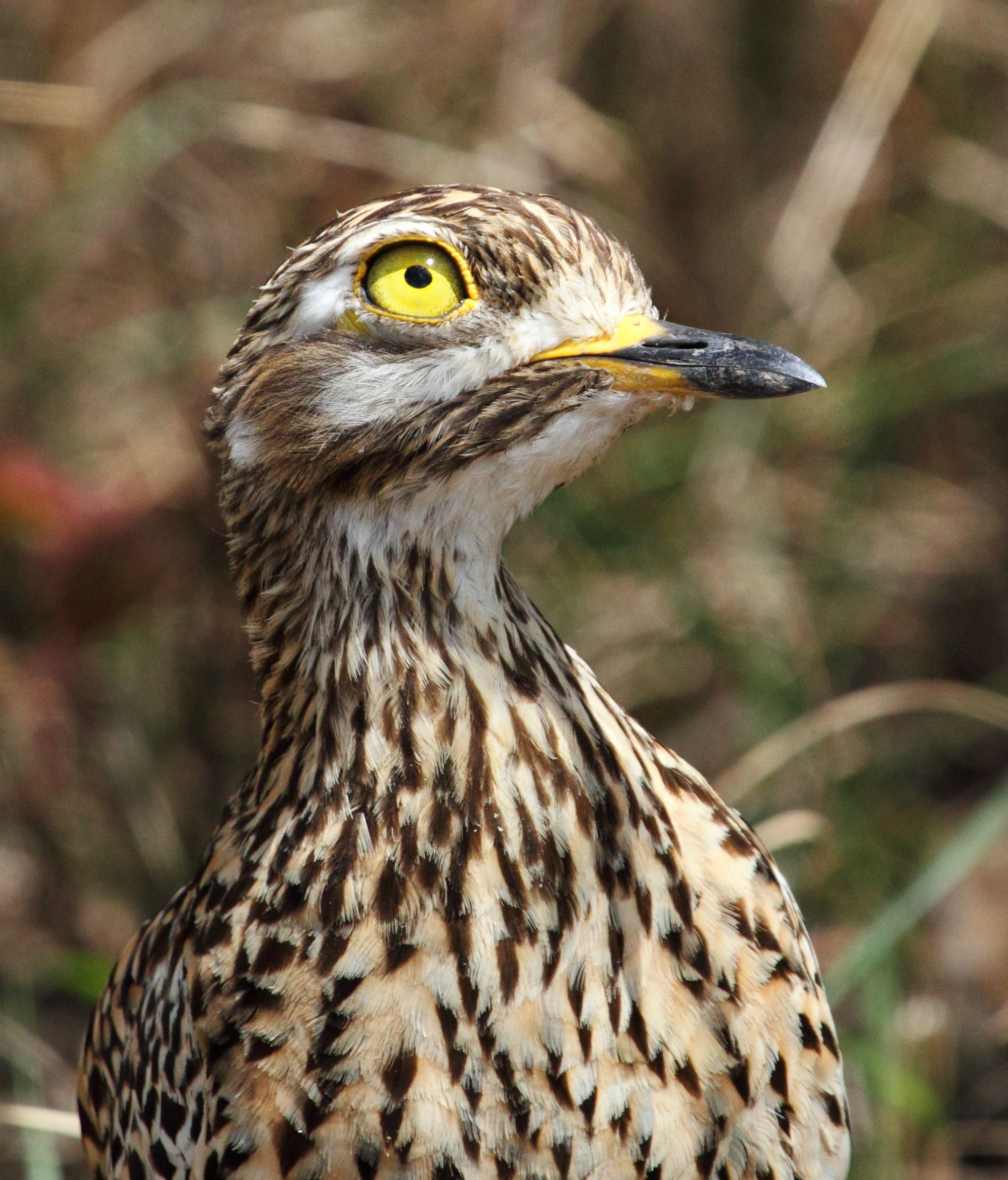
Spotted thick-knee

Order: Charadriiformes Family: Burhinidae

The stone-curlews and thick-knees are a group of largely tropical waders in the family Burhinidae. They are found worldwide within the tropical zone, with some species also breeding in temperate Europe and Australia. They are medium to large waders with strong black or yellow-black bills, large yellow eyes, and cryptic plumage. Despite being classed as waders, most species have a preference for arid or semi-arid habitats.

Common name	Binomial	Status
Water thick-knee	Burhinus vermiculatus	
Spotted thick-knee	Burhinus capensis	

== Stilts and avocets ==
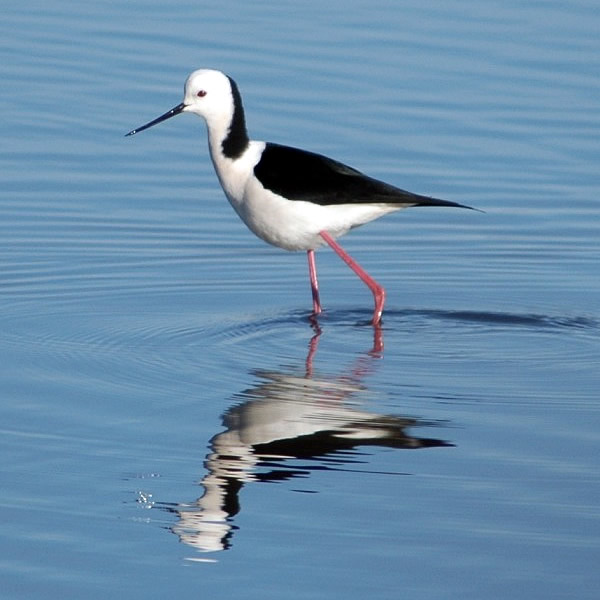
Black-winged stilt

Order: Charadriiformes Family: Recurvirostridae

Recurvirostridae is a family of large wading birds, which includes the avocets and stilts. The avocets have long legs and long up-curved bills. The stilts have extremely long legs and long, thin, straight bills.

Common name	Binomial	Status
Black-winged stilt	Himantopus himantopus	
Pied avocet	Recurvirostra avosetta	

== Oystercatchers ==
Order: Charadriiformes Family: Haematopodidae

The oystercatchers are large and noisy plover-like birds, with strong bills used for smashing or prising open molluscs.

Common name	Binomial	Status
Eurasian oystercatcher	Haematopus ostralegus	Vagrant; near threatened
African oystercatcher	Haematopus moquini	

== Plovers and lapwings ==
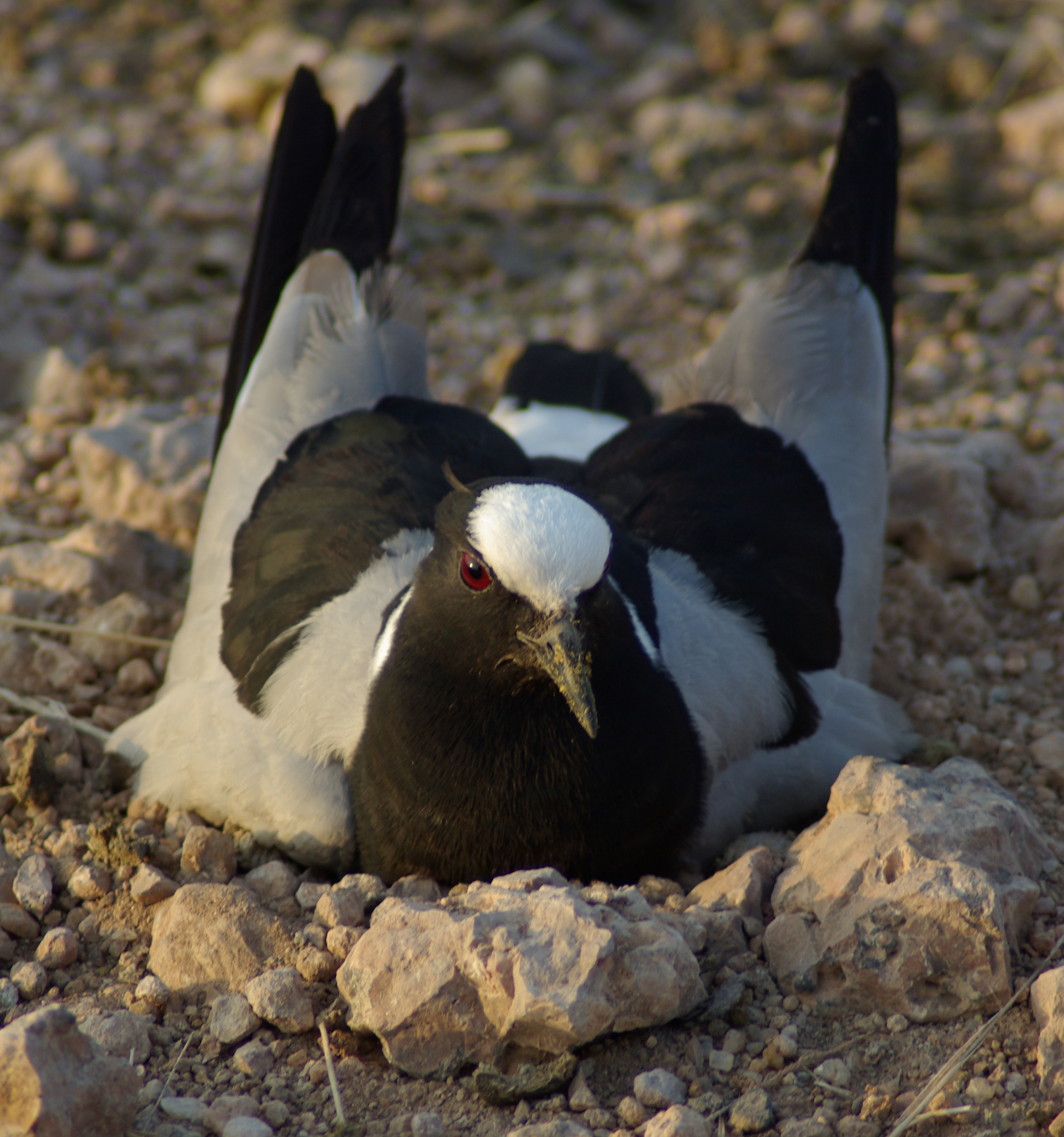
Nesting blacksmith lapwing

Order: Charadriiformes Family: Charadriidae

The family Charadriidae includes the plovers, dotterels, and lapwings. They are small to medium-sized birds with compact bodies, short thick necks, and long, usually pointed, wings. They are found in open country worldwide, mostly in habitats near water.

Common name	Binomial	Status
Black-bellied plover	Pluvialis squatarola	
American golden-plover	Pluvialis dominica	Vagrant
Pacific golden-plover	Pluvialis fulva	Vagrant
Long-toed lapwing	Vanellus crassirostris	Vagrant
Blacksmith lapwing	Vanellus armatus	
Spur-winged lapwing	Vanellus spinosus	Vagrant
White-headed lapwing	Vanellus albiceps	
Senegal lapwing	Vanellus lugubris	
Black-winged lapwing	Vanellus melanopterus	
Crowned lapwing	Vanellus coronatus	
Wattled lapwing	Vanellus senegallus	
Lesser sand-plover	Charadrius mongolus	
Greater sand-plover	Charadrius leschenaultii	
Caspian plover	Charadrius asiaticus	
Kittlitz's plover	Charadrius pecuarius	
Common ringed plover	Charadrius hiaticula	
Little ringed plover	Charadrius dubius	Vagrant
Three-banded plover	Charadrius tricollaris	
White-fronted plover	Charadrius marginatus	
Chestnut-banded plover	Charadrius pallidus	Near threatened

== Painted-snipes ==
Order: Charadriiformes Family: Rostratulidae

Painted-snipe are short-legged, long-billed birds similar in shape to the true snipes, but more brightly coloured.

Common name	Binomial	Status
Greater painted-snipe	Rostratula benghalensis	

== Jacanas ==
Order: Charadriiformes Family: Jacanidae

The jacanas are a group of waders found throughout the tropics. They are identifiable by their huge feet and claws which enable them to walk on floating vegetation in the shallow lakes that are their preferred habitat.

Common name	Binomial	Status
Lesser jacana	Microparra capensis	
African jacana	Actophilornis africanus	

== Sandpipers and allies ==
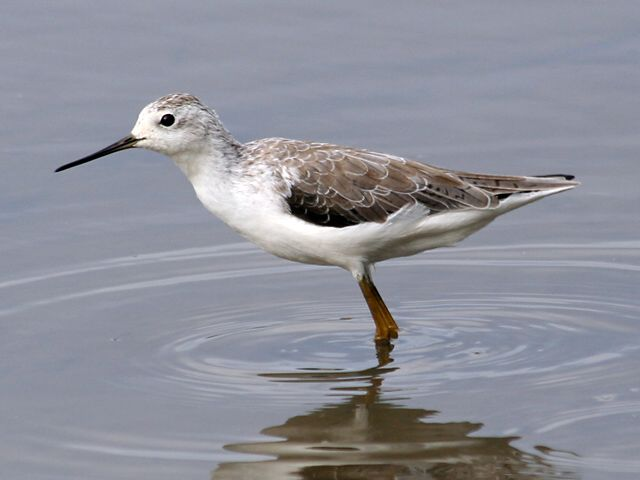
Marsh sandpiper

Order: Charadriiformes Family: Scolopacidae

Scolopacidae is a large diverse family of small to medium-sized shorebirds including the sandpipers, curlews, godwits, shanks, tattlers, woodcocks, snipes, dowitchers, and phalaropes. The majority of these species eat small invertebrates picked out of the mud or soil. Variation in length of legs and bills enables multiple species to feed in the same habitat, particularly on the coast, without direct competition for food.

Common name	Binomial	Status
Whimbrel	Numenius phaeopus	
Eurasian curlew	Numenius arquata	Near threatened
Bar-tailed godwit	Limosa lapponica	Near threatened
Black-tailed godwit	Limosa limosa	Vagrant; near threatened
Hudsonian godwit	Limosa haemastica	Vagrant
Ruddy turnstone	Arenaria interpres	
Great knot	Calidris tenuirostris	Vagrant; endangered
Red knot	Calidris canutus	Near threatened
Ruff	Calidris pugnax	
Broad-billed sandpiper	Calidris falcinellus	Vagrant
Curlew sandpiper	Calidris ferruginea	Near threatened
Temminck's stint	Calidris temminckii	Vagrant
Long-toed stint	Calidris subminuta	Vagrant
Red-necked stint	Calidris ruficollis	Vagrant; near threatened
Sanderling	Calidris alba	
Dunlin	Calidris alpina	Vagrant
Baird's sandpiper	Calidris bairdii	Vagrant
Little stint	Calidris minuta	
White-rumped sandpiper	Calidris fuscicollis	Vagrant
Buff-breasted sandpiper	Calidris subruficollis	Vagrant; near threatened
Pectoral sandpiper	Calidris melanotos	Vagrant
Asian dowitcher	Limnodromus semipalmatus	Vagrant; near threatened
Great snipe	Gallinago media	Vagrant; near threatened
African snipe	Gallinago nigripennis	
Terek sandpiper	Xenus cinereus	
Wilson's phalarope	Phalaropus tricolor	Vagrant
Red-necked phalarope	Phalaropus lobatus	Vagrant; near threatened
Red phalarope	Phalaropus fulicarius	
Common sandpiper	Actitis hypoleucos	
Green sandpiper	Tringa ochropus	
Spotted redshank	Tringa erythropus	Vagrant
Common greenshank	Tringa nebularia	
Lesser yellowlegs	Tringa flavipes	Vagrant
Marsh sandpiper	Tringa stagnatilis	
Wood sandpiper	Tringa glareola	
Common redshank	Tringa totanus	

== Buttonquail ==
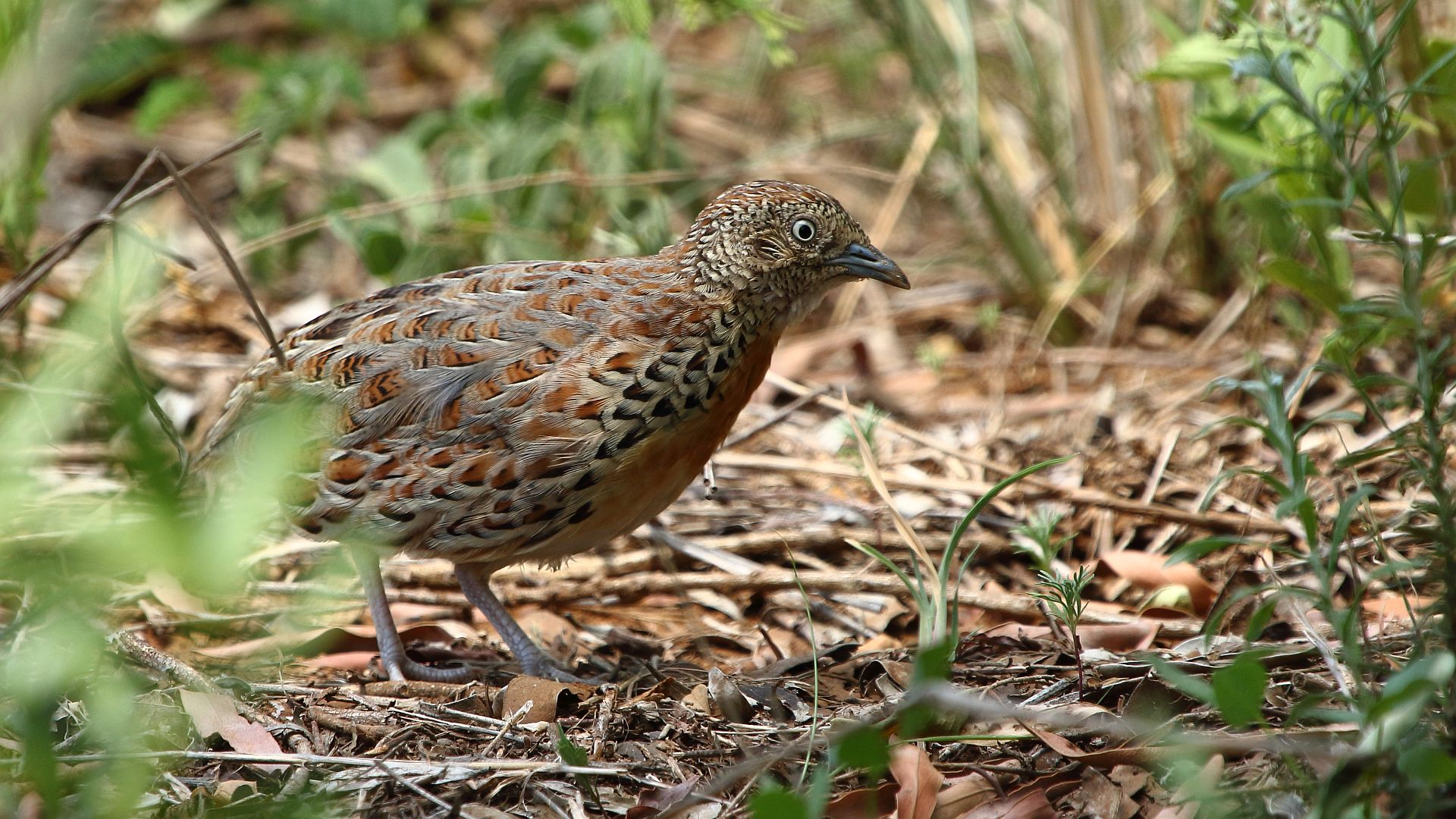
Small buttonquail

Order: Charadriiformes Family: Turnicidae

The buttonquails are small, drab, running birds which resemble the true quails. The female is the brighter of the sexes and initiates courtship. The male incubates the eggs and tends the young.

Common name	Binomial	Status
Small buttonquail	Turnix sylvaticus	
Black-rumped buttonquail	Turnix nanus	
Fynbos buttonquail	Turnix hottentottus	Endemic

== Crab-plover ==
Order: Charadriiformes Family: Dromadidae

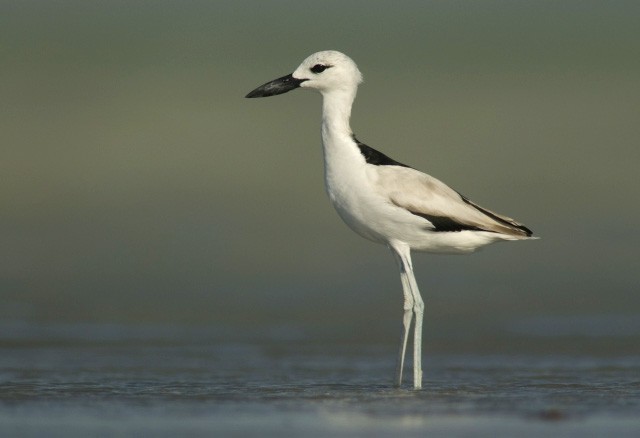
Dromas ardeola

The crab-plover is related to the waders. It resembles a plover but with very long grey legs and a strong heavy black bill similar to a tern's. It has black-and-white plumage, a long neck, partially webbed feet, and a bill designed for eating crabs.

Common name	Binomial	Status
Crab-plover	Dromas ardeola	Vagrant

== Pratincoles and coursers ==
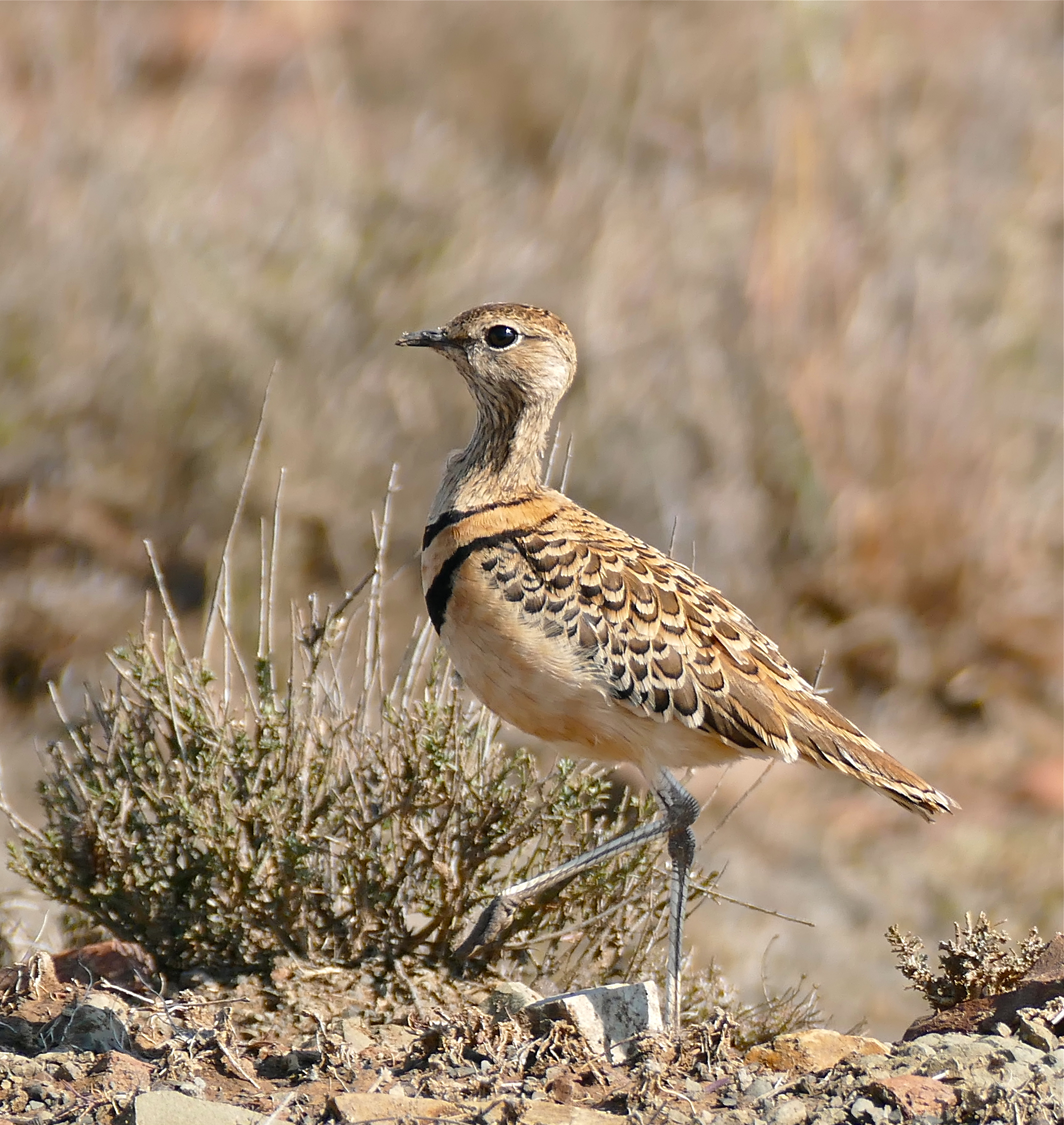
Double-banded courser

Order: Charadriiformes Family: Glareolidae

Glareolidae is a family of wading birds comprising the pratincoles, which have short legs, long pointed wings, and long forked tails, and the coursers, which have long legs, short wings, and long, pointed bills which curve downwards.

Common name	Binomial	Status
Burchell's courser	Cursorius rufus	
Temminck's courser	Cursorius temminckii	
Double-banded courser	Smutsornis africanus	
Three-banded courser	Rhinoptilus cinctus	
Bronze-winged courser	Rhinoptilus chalcopterus	
Collared pratincole	Glareola pratincola	
Black-winged pratincole	Glareola nordmanni	Near threatened
Rock pratincole	Glareola nuchalis	Vagrant

== Skuas and jaegers ==
Order: Charadriiformes Family: Stercorariidae

The family Stercorariidae are, in general, medium to large birds, typically with grey or brown plumage, often with white markings on the wings. They nest on the ground in temperate and arctic regions and are long-distance migrants.

Common name	Binomial	Status
South polar skua	Stercorarius maccormicki	Vagrant
Brown skua	Stercorarius antarcticus	
Pomarine jaeger	Stercorarius pomarinus	
Parasitic jaeger	Stercorarius parasiticus	
Long-tailed jaeger	Stercorarius longicaudus	

== Gulls, terns, and skimmers ==
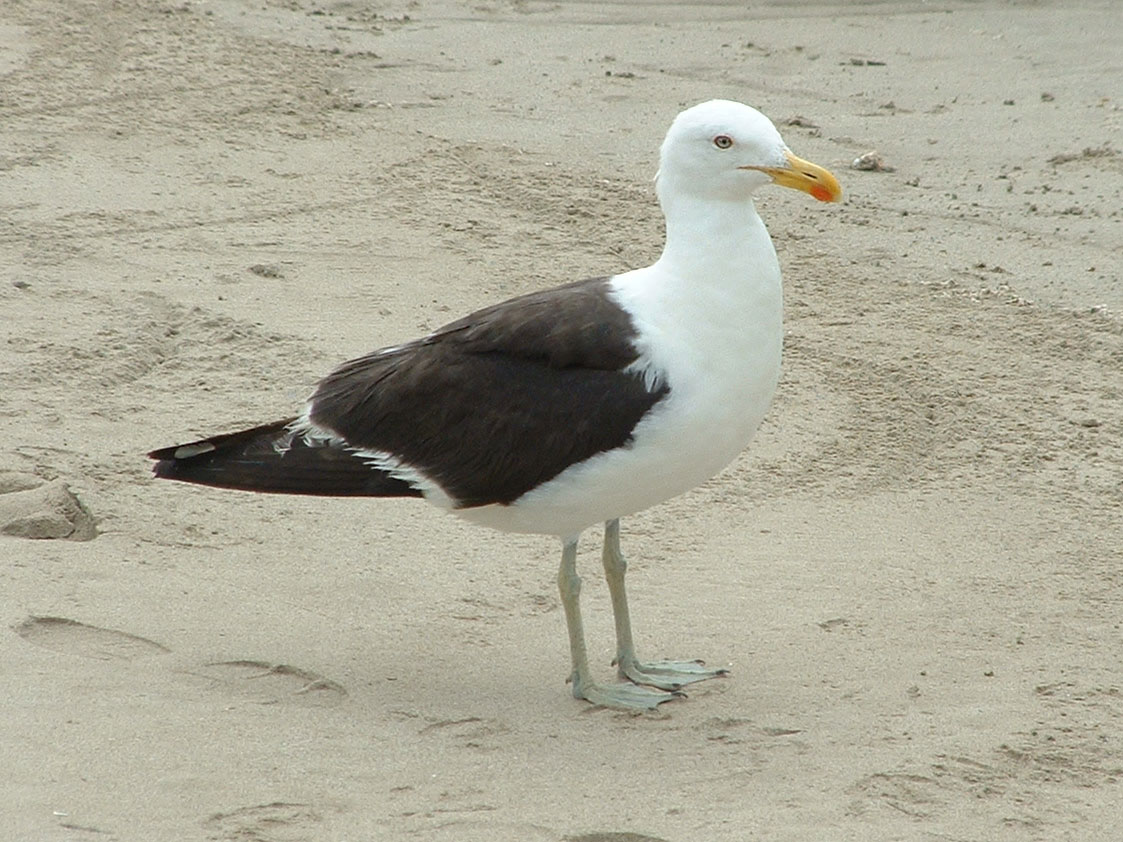
Kelp gull

Order: Charadriiformes Family: Laridae

Laridae is a family of medium to large seabirds, the gulls, terns, and skimmers. Gulls are typically grey or white, often with black markings on the head or wings. They have stout, longish bills and webbed feet. Terns are a group of generally medium to large seabirds typically with grey or white plumage, often with black markings on the head. Most terns hunt fish by diving but some pick insects off the surface of fresh water. Terns are generally long-lived birds, with several species known to live in excess of 30 years. Skimmers are a small family of tropical tern-like birds. They have an elongated lower mandible which they use to feed by flying low over the water surface and skimming the water for small fish.

Common name	Binomial	Status
Black-legged kittiwake	Rissa tridactyla	Vagrant; vulnerable
Sabine's gull	Xema sabini	
Slender-billed gull	Chroicocephalus genei	Vagrant
Grey-hooded gull	Chroicocephalus cirrocephalus	
Hartlaub's gull	Chroicocephalus hartlaubii	
Black-headed gull	Chroicocephalus ridibundus	Vagrant
Laughing gull	Leucophaeus atricilla	Vagrant
Franklin's gull	Leucophaeus pipixcan	Vagrant
Sooty gull	Ichthyaetus hemprichii	Vagrant
Ring-billed gull	Larus delawarensis	
Lesser black-backed gull	Larus fuscus	Vagrant
Kelp gull	Larus dominicanus	See note (Note: Subspecies L. d. vetula is a resident breeder, sometimes called the Cape gull.)
Brown noddy	Anous stolidus	Vagrant
Lesser noddy	Anous tenuirostris	Vagrant
Sooty tern	Onychoprion fuscatus	
Bridled tern	Onychoprion anaethetus	Vagrant
Little tern	Sternula albifrons	Winter migrant
Damara tern	Sternula balaenarum	Vulnerable
Gull-billed tern	Gelochelidon nilotica	Vagrant
Caspian tern	Hydroprogne caspia	
Black tern	Chlidonias niger	Vagrant
White-winged tern	Chlidonias leucopterus	
Whiskered tern	Chlidonias hybrida	
Roseate tern	Sterna dougallii	
Black-naped tern	Sterna sumatrana	Vagrant
Common tern	Sterna hirundo	
Arctic tern	Sterna paradisaea	
Antarctic tern	Sterna vittata	
White-cheeked tern	Sterna repressa	Vagrant
Great crested tern	Thalasseus bergii	
Sandwich tern	Thalasseus sandvicensis	
Elegant tern	Thalasseus elegans	Vagrant
Lesser crested tern	Thalasseus bengalensis	
Black skimmer	Rynchops niger	Vagrant
African skimmer	Rynchops flavirostris	Vagrant; near threatened

== Tropicbirds ==
Order: Phaethontiformes Family: Phaethontidae

Tropicbirds are slender white birds of tropical oceans, with exceptionally long central tail feathers. Their heads and long wings have black markings.

Common name	Binomial	Status
White-tailed tropicbird	Phaethon lepturus	Vagrant
Red-billed tropicbird	Phaethon aethereus	Vagrant
Red-tailed tropicbird	Phaethon rubricauda	Vagrant

== Penguins ==
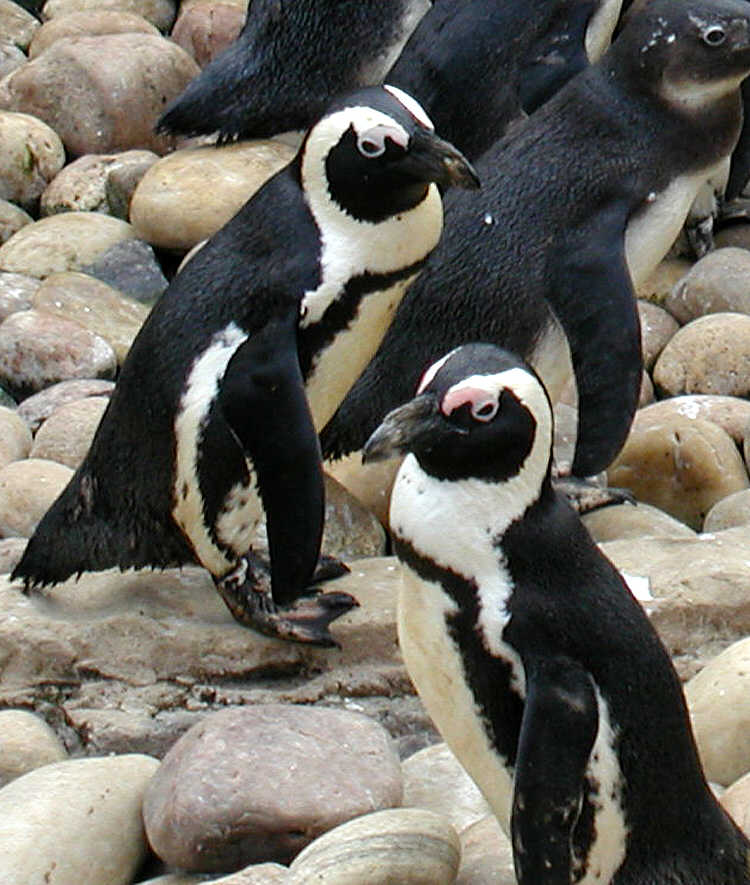
African penguins

Order: Sphenisciformes Family: Spheniscidae

The penguins are a group of flightless aquatic birds living almost exclusively in the Southern Hemisphere. Most penguins feed on krill, fish, squid, and other forms of marine life caught while swimming underwater.

Common name	Binomial	Status
King penguin	Aptenodytes patagonicus	Vagrant
African penguin	Spheniscus demersus	Endangered
Macaroni penguin	Eudyptes chrysolophus	Vagrant; vulnerable
Southern rockhopper penguin	Eudyptes chrysocome	Vagrant; vulnerable
Moseley's rockhopper penguin	Eudyptes moseleyi	Vagrant; endangered

== Albatrosses ==
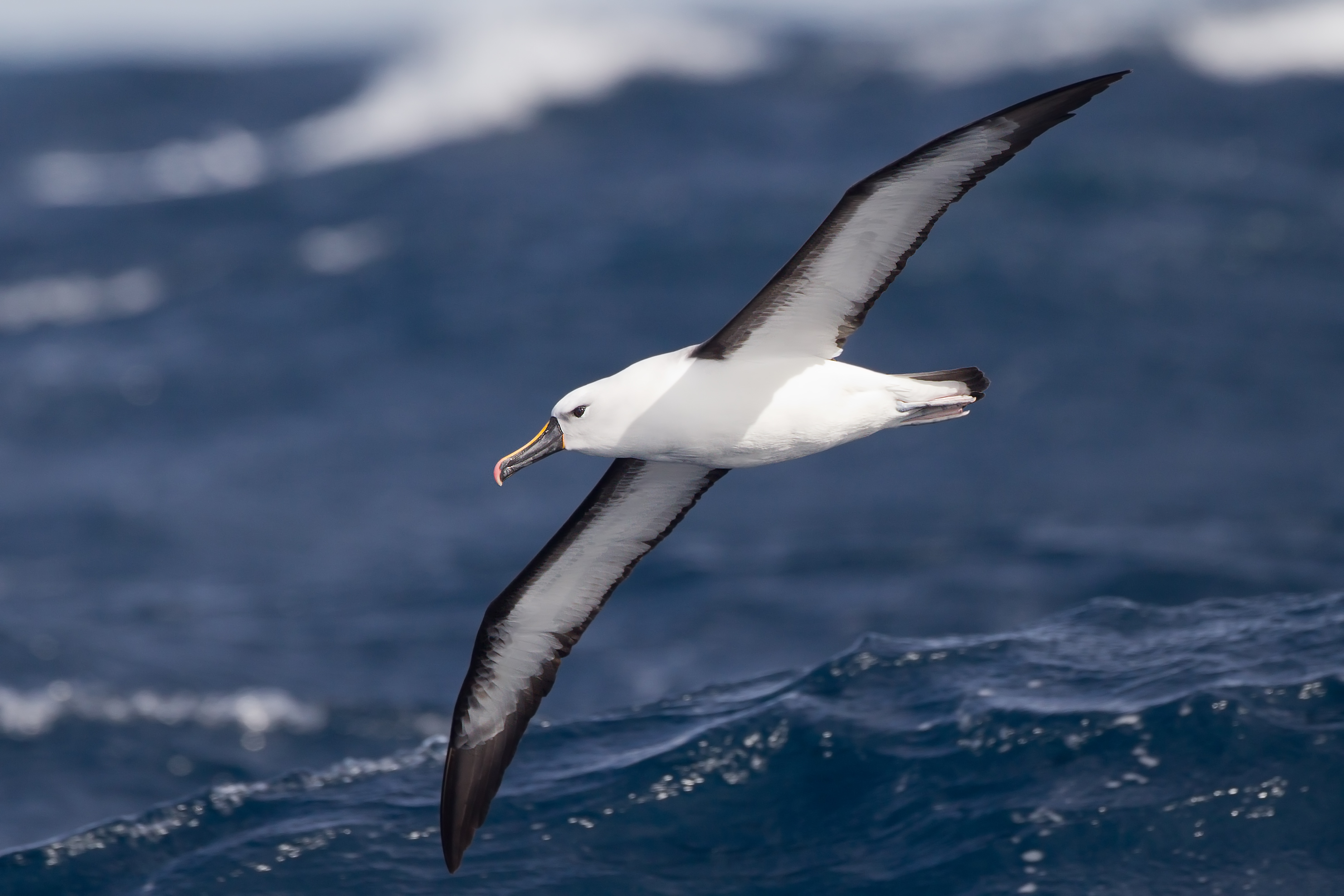
Indian yellow-nosed albatross

Order: Procellariiformes Family: Diomedeidae

The albatrosses are among the largest of flying birds, with those of the genus Diomedea having the largest wingspan of any extant bird.

Common name	Binomial	Status
Yellow-nosed albatross	Thalassarche chlororhynchos	Endangered
Gray-headed albatross	Thalassarche chrysostoma	Vagrant; endangered
Buller's albatross	Thalassarche bulleri	Vagrant; near threatened
White-capped albatross	Thalassarche cauta	Near threatened
Salvin's albatross	Thalassarche salvini	Vagrant; vulnerable
Chatham albatross	Thalassarche eremita	Vagrant; vulnerable
Black-browed albatross	Thalassarche melanophrys	
Sooty albatross	Phoebetria fusca	Vagrant; endangered
Light-mantled albatross	Phoebetria palpebrata	Vagrant; near threatened
Royal albatross	Diomedea epomophora	Vagrant; vulnerable
Wandering albatross	Diomedea exulans	Vulnerable
Laysan albatross	Phoebastria immutabilis	Vagrant; near threatened

== Southern storm-petrels ==
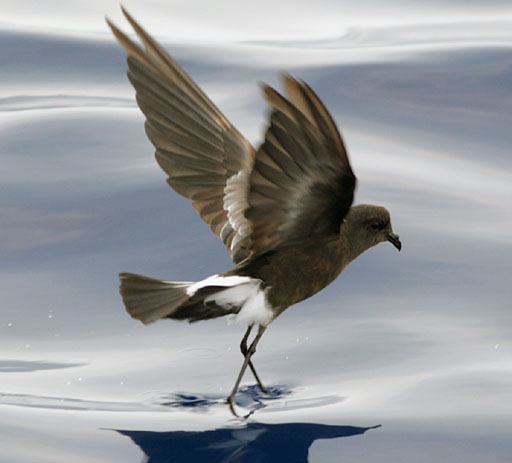
Wilson's storm-petrel 'pattering' on the ocean surface

Order: Procellariiformes Family: Oceanitidae

The storm-petrels are the smallest seabirds, relatives of the petrels, feeding on planktonic crustaceans and small fish picked from the surface, typically while hovering. The flight is fluttering and sometimes bat-like. Until 2018, this family's species were included with the other storm-petrels in family Hydrobatidae.

Common name	Binomial	Status
Wilson's storm-petrel	Oceanites oceanicus	
Gray-backed storm-petrel	Garrodia nereis	Vagrant
White-faced storm-petrel	Pelagodroma marina	Vagrant
White-bellied storm-petrel	Fregetta grallaria	Vagrant
Black-bellied storm-petrel	Fregetta tropica	

== Northern storm-petrels ==
Order: Procellariiformes Family: Hydrobatidae

Though the members of this family are similar in many respects to the southern storm-petrels, including their general appearance and habits, there are enough genetic differences to warrant their placement in a separate family.

Common name	Binomial	Status
European storm-petrel	Hydrobates pelagicus	
Leach's storm-petrel	Hydrobates leucorhous	Vulnerable
Swinhoe's storm-petrel	Hydrobates monorhis	Vagrant
Matsudaira's storm-petrel	Hydrobates matsudairae	Vagrant; vulnerable

== Shearwaters and petrels ==
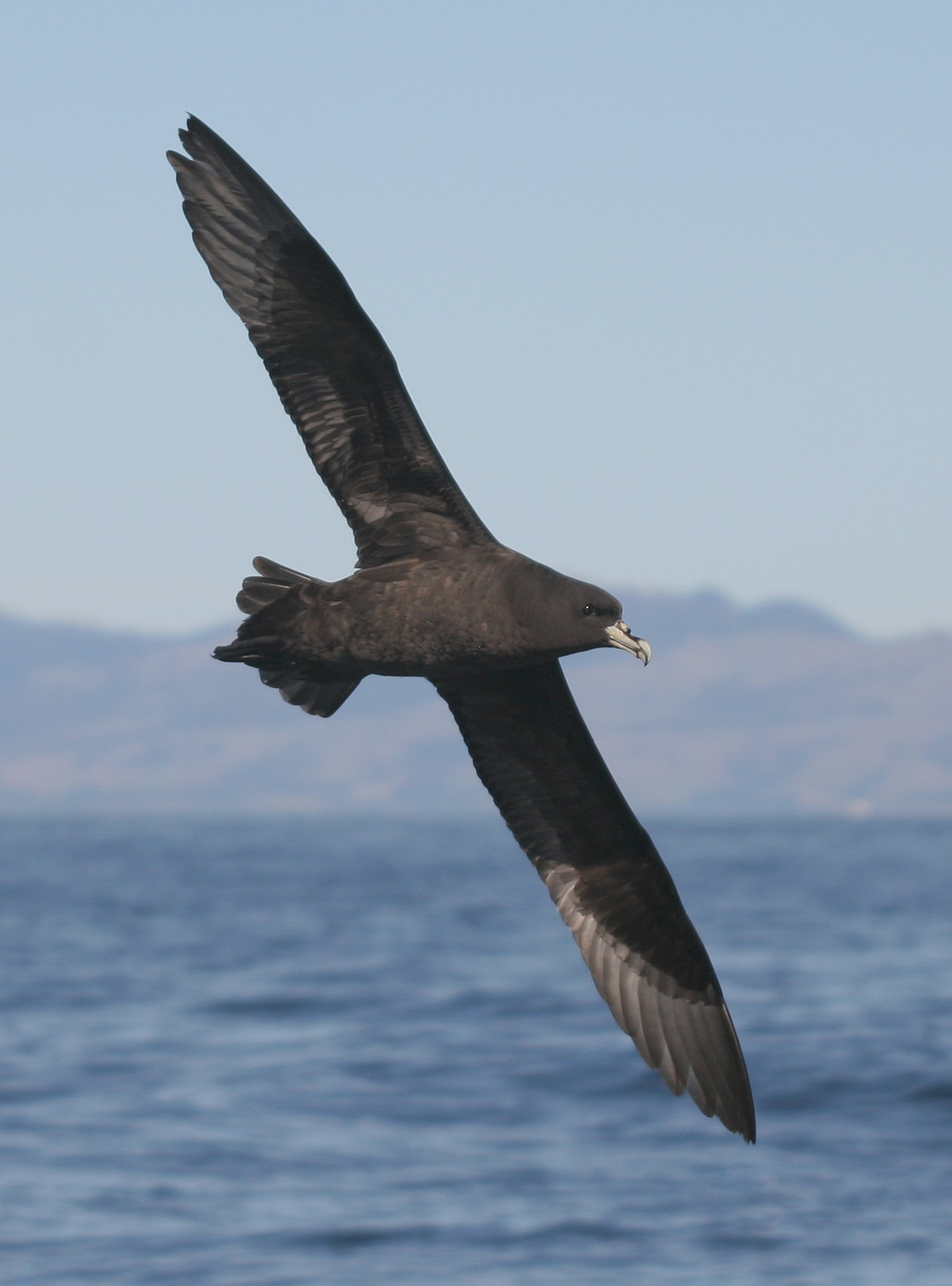
White-chinned petrel

Order: Procellariiformes Family: Procellariidae

The procellariids are the main group of medium-sized "true petrels", characterised by united nostrils with medium septum and a long outer functional primary.

Common name	Binomial	Status
Southern giant-petrel	Macronectes giganteus	
Northern giant-petrel	Macronectes halli	
Southern fulmar	Fulmarus glacialoides	
Antarctic petrel	Thalassoica antarctica	Vagrant
Cape petrel	Daption capense	
Snow petrel	Pagodroma nivea	Vagrant
Kerguelen petrel	Aphrodroma brevirostris	Vagrant
Great-winged petrel	Pterodroma macroptera	
Gray-faced petrel	Pterodroma gouldi	Vagrant
Trindade petrel	Pterodroma arminjoniana	Vagrant
Soft-plumaged petrel	Pterodroma mollis	
Barau's petrel	Pterodroma baraui	Vagrant; endangered
White-headed petrel	Pterodroma lessonii	Vagrant
Atlantic petrel	Pterodroma incerta	Vagrant; endangered
Blue petrel	Halobaena caerulea	Vagrant
Fairy prion	Pachyptila turtur	Vagrant
Broad-billed prion	Pachyptila vittata	Vagrant
Salvin's prion	Pachyptila salvini	Vagrant
Antarctic prion	Pachyptila desolata	
Slender-billed prion	Pachyptila belcheri	Vagrant
Jouanin's petrel	Bulweria fallax	Vagrant
Tahiti petrel	Pseudobulweria rostrata	Vagrant
Gray petrel	Procellaria cinerea	Vagrant; near threatened
White-chinned petrel	Procellaria aequinoctialis	Vulnerable
Spectacled petrel	Procellaria conspicillata	Vulnerable
Streaked shearwater	Calonectris leucomelas	Vagrant; near threatened
Cory's shearwater	Calonectris diomedea	
Flesh-footed shearwater	Ardenna carneipes	Near threatened
Great shearwater	Ardenna gravis	
Wedge-tailed shearwater	Ardenna pacifica	Vagrant
Sooty shearwater	Ardenna grisea	Near threatened
Manx shearwater	Puffinus puffinus	
Balearic shearwater	Puffinus mauretanicus	Vagrant
Subantarctic shearwater	Puffinus elegans	Vagrant
Tropical shearwater	Puffinus bailloni	Vagrant

== Storks ==
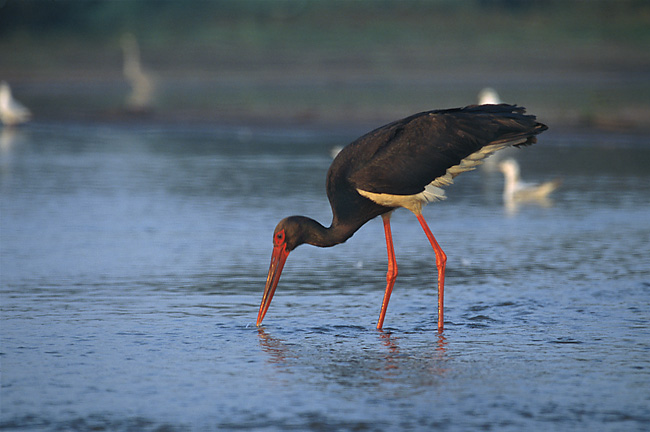
Black stork

Order: Ciconiiformes Family: Ciconiidae

Storks are large, long-legged, long-necked wading birds with long stout bills. Storks are mute, but bill-clattering is an important mode of communication at the nest. Their nests can be large and may be reused for many years. Many species are migratory.

Common name	Binomial	Status
African openbill	Anastomus lamelligerus	
Black stork	Ciconia nigra	
Abdim's stork	Ciconia abdimii	
African woolly-necked stork	Ciconia microscelis	
White stork	Ciconia ciconia	
Saddle-billed stork	Ephippiorhynchus senegalensis	
Marabou stork	Leptoptilos crumenifer	
Yellow-billed stork	Mycteria ibis	

== Frigatebirds ==
Order: Suliformes Family: Fregatidae

Frigatebirds are large seabirds usually found over tropical oceans. They are large, black, or black-and-white, with long wings and deeply forked tails. The males have coloured inflatable throat pouches. They do not swim or walk and cannot take off from a flat surface. Having the largest wingspan-to-body-weight ratio of any bird, they are essentially aerial, able to stay aloft for more than a week.

Common name	Binomial	Status
Lesser frigatebird	Fregata ariel	Vagrant
Great frigatebird	Fregata minor	Vagrant

== Boobies and gannets ==
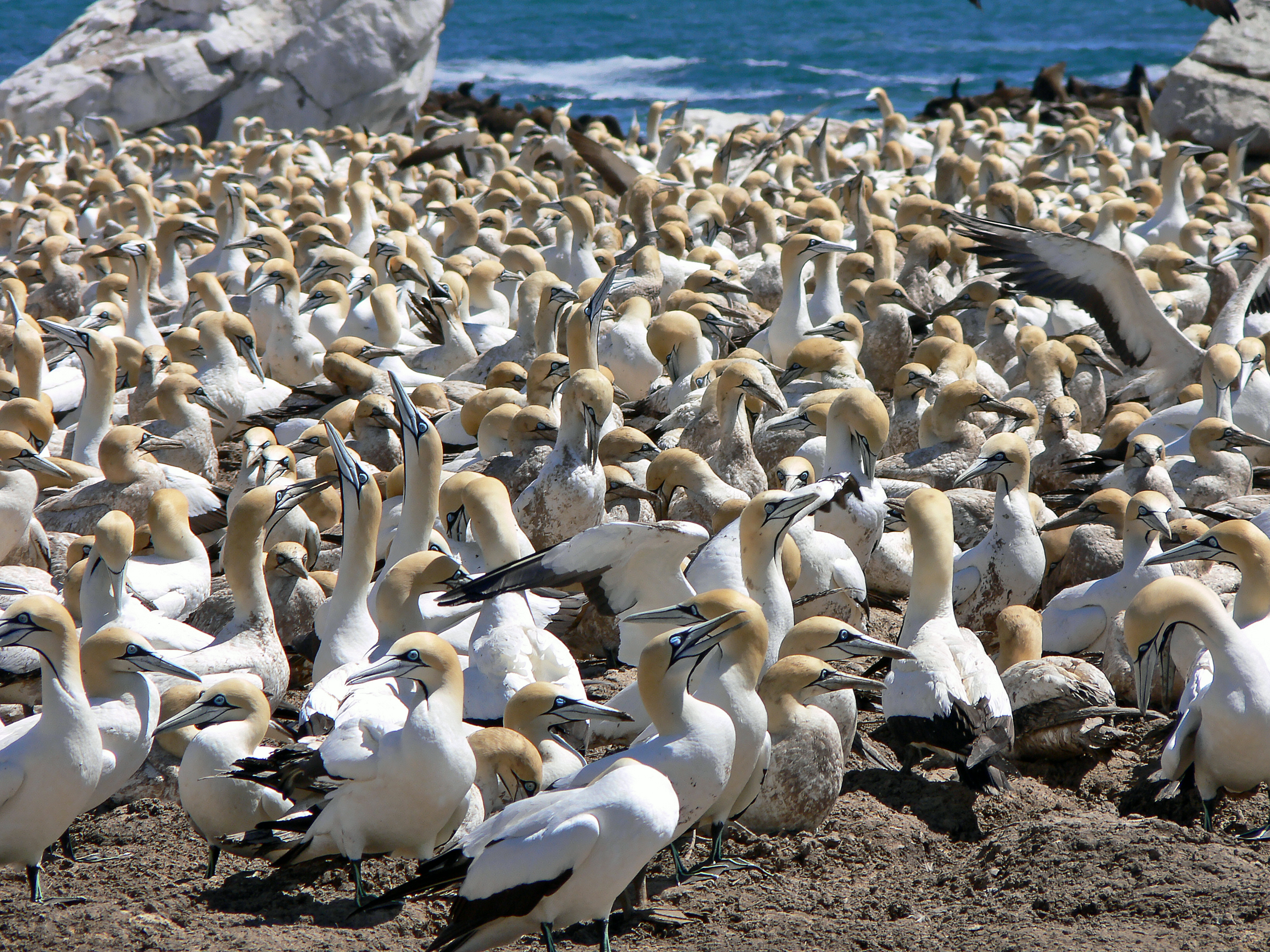
Breeding colony of Cape gannets

Order: Suliformes Family: Sulidae

The sulids comprise the gannets and boobies. Both groups are medium to large coastal seabirds that plunge-dive for fish.

Common name	Binomial	Status
Masked booby	Sula dactylatra	Vagrant
Brown booby	Sula leucogaster	Vagrant
Red-footed booby	Sula sula	Vagrant
Cape gannet	Morus capensis	Endangered
Australasian gannet	Morus serrator	Vagrant

== Anhingas ==
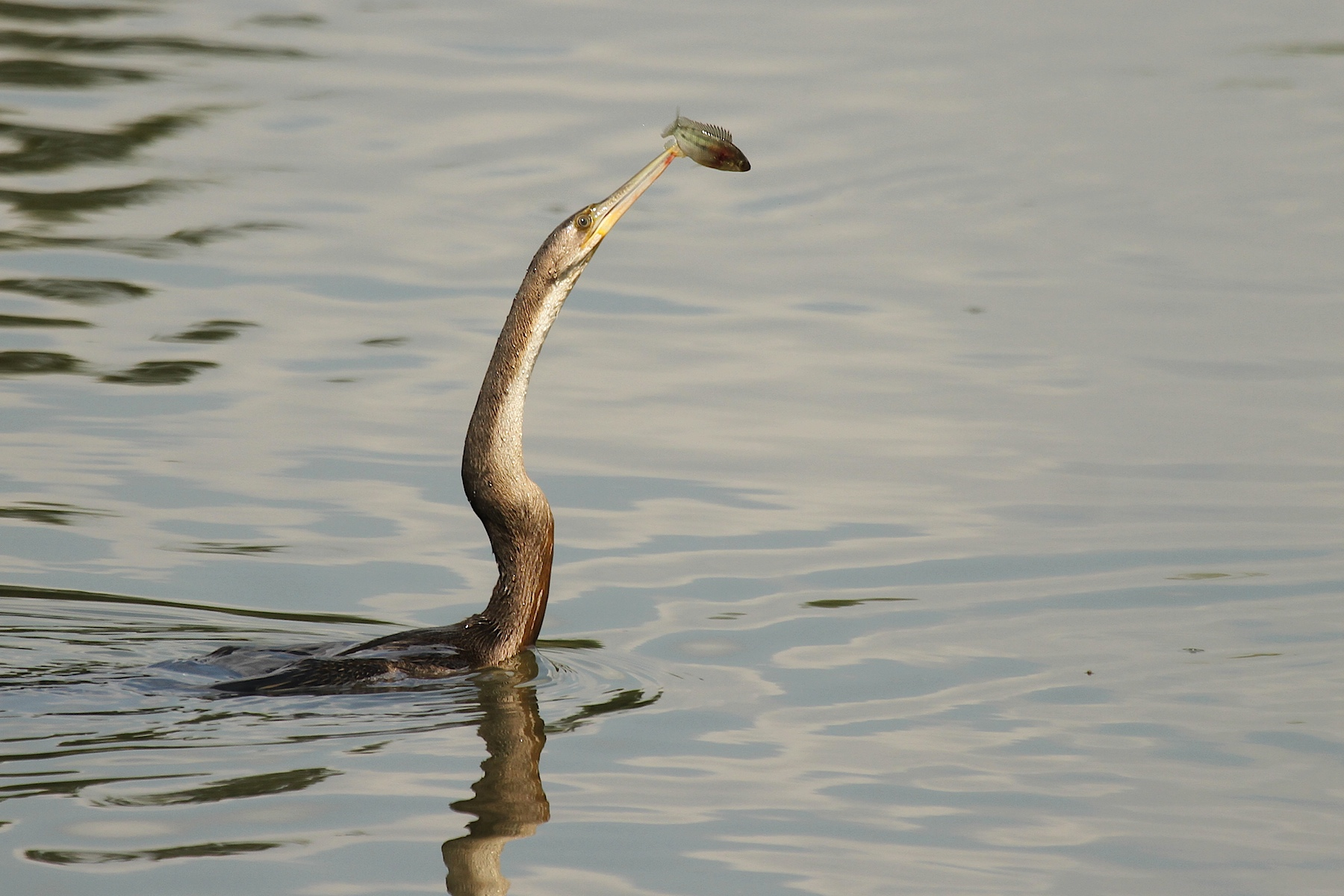
African darter

Order: Suliformes Family: Anhingidae

Anhingas or darters are often called "snake-birds" because of their long thin neck, which gives a snake-like appearance when they swim with their bodies submerged. The males have black and dark-brown plumage, an erectile crest on the nape, and a larger bill than the female. The females have much paler plumage especially on the neck and underparts. The darters have completely webbed feet and their legs are short and set far back on the body. Their plumage is somewhat permeable, like that of cormorants, and they spread their wings to dry after diving.

Common name	Binomial	Status
African darter	Anhinga rufa	

== Cormorants and shags ==
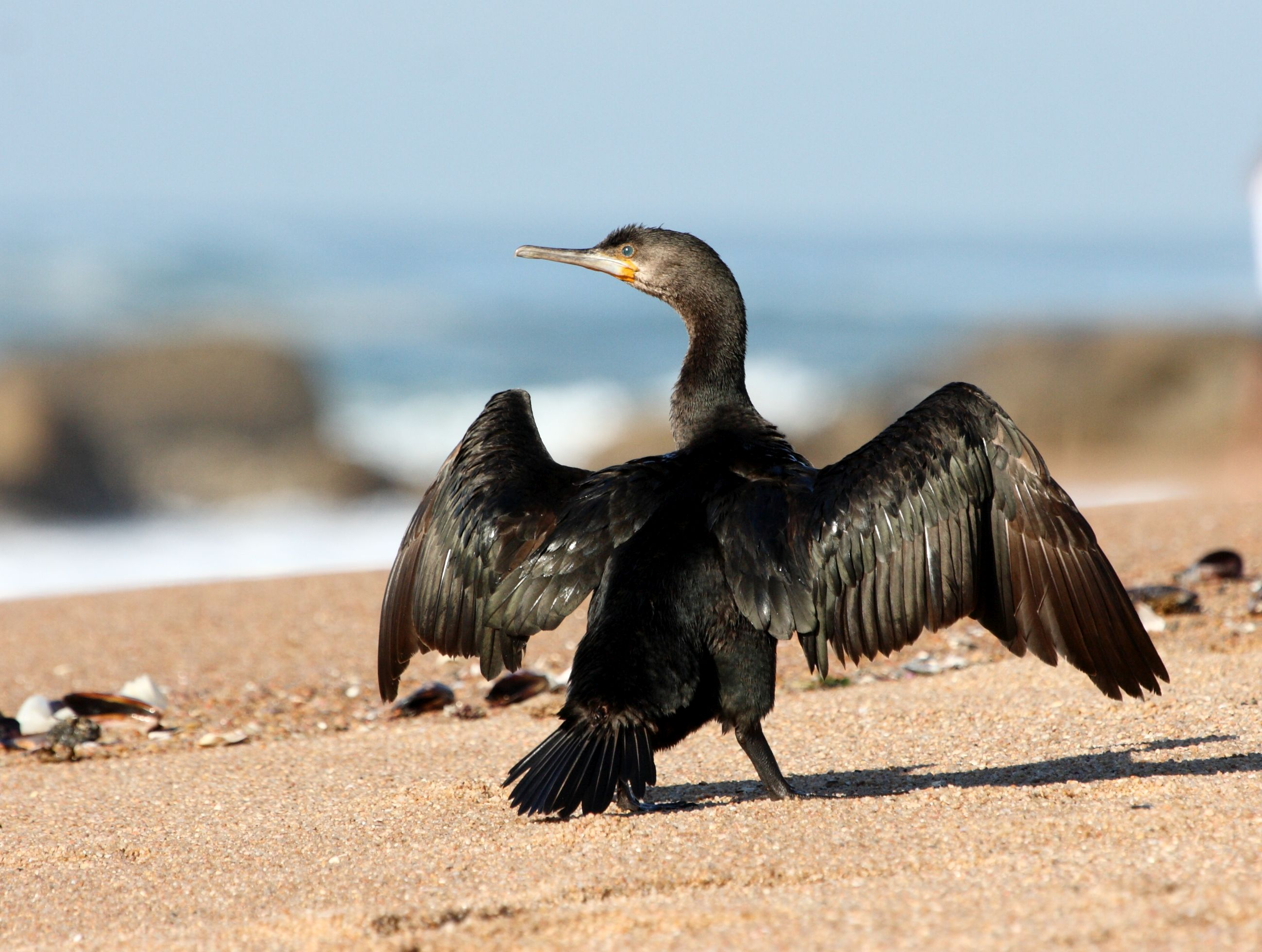
Cape cormorant

Order: Suliformes Family: Phalacrocoracidae

Phalacrocoracidae is a family of medium to large coastal, fish-eating seabirds that includes cormorants and shags. Plumage colouration varies, with the majority having mainly dark plumage, some species being black-and-white, and a few being colourful.

Common name	Binomial	Status
Long-tailed cormorant	Microcarbo africanus	
Crowned cormorant	Microcarbo coronatus	Near threatened
Bank cormorant	Phalacrocorax neglectus	Endangered
Cape cormorant	Phalacrocorax capensis	Endangered
Great cormorant	Phalacrocorax carbo	

== Pelicans ==
Order: Pelecaniformes Family: Pelecanidae

Pelicans are large water birds with a distinctive pouch under their beak. As with other members of the order Pelecaniformes, they have webbed feet with four toes.

Common name	Binomial	Status
Great white pelican	Pelecanus onocrotalus	
Pink-backed pelican	Pelecanus rufescens	

== Hamerkop ==
Order: Pelecaniformes Family: Scopidae

The hamerkop is a medium-sized bird with a long shaggy crest. The shape of its head with a curved bill and crest at the back is reminiscent of a hammer, hence its name. Its plumage is drab-brown all over.

Common name	Binomial	Status
Hamerkop	Scopus umbretta	

== Herons, egrets, and bitterns ==
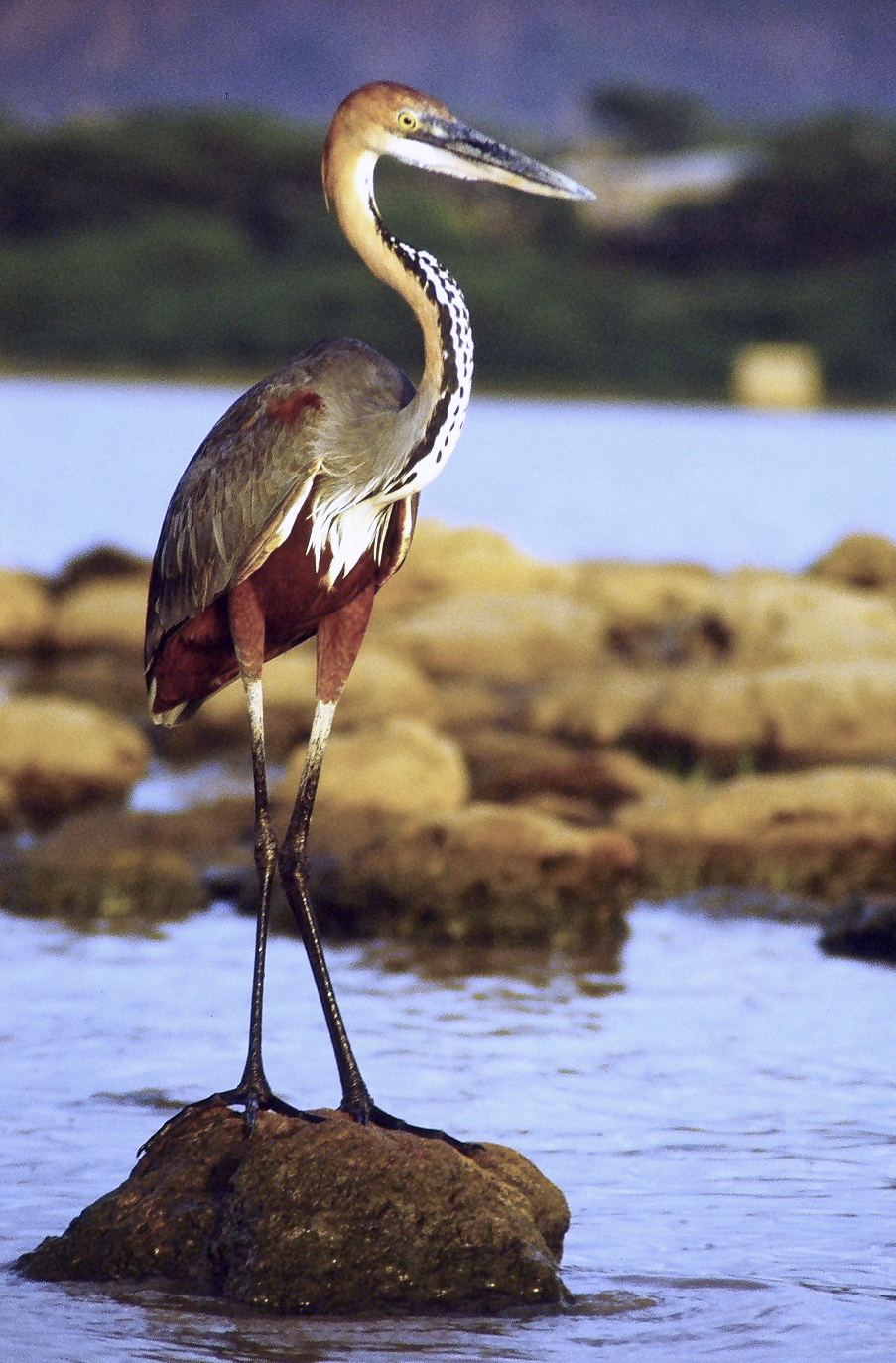
The Goliath heron is the world's largest species of heron

Order: Pelecaniformes Family: Ardeidae

The family Ardeidae contains the bitterns, herons, and egrets. Herons and egrets are medium to large wading birds with long necks and legs. Bitterns tend to be shorter necked and more wary. Members of Ardeidae fly with their necks retracted, unlike other long-necked birds such as storks, ibises, and spoonbills.

Common name	Binomial	Status
Great bittern	Botaurus stellaris	Vagrant
Little bittern	Ixobrychus minutus	
Dwarf bittern	Ixobrychus sturmii	
Gray heron	Ardea cinerea	
Black-headed heron	Ardea melanocephala	
Goliath heron	Ardea goliath	
Purple heron	Ardea purpurea	
Great egret	Ardea alba	
Intermediate egret	Ardea intermedia	
Little egret	Egretta garzetta	
Snowy egret	Egretta thula	Vagrant
Little blue heron	Egretta caerulea	Vagrant
Slaty egret	Egretta vinaceigula	Vagrant; vulnerable
Black heron	Egretta ardesiaca	
Cattle egret	Bubulcus ibis	
Squacco heron	Ardeola ralloides	
Malagasy pond-heron	Ardeola idae	Vagrant
Rufous-bellied heron	Ardeola rufiventris	Vagrant
Striated heron	Butorides striata	
Black-crowned night-heron	Nycticorax nycticorax	
White-backed night-heron	Gorsachius leuconotus	

== Ibises and spoonbills ==
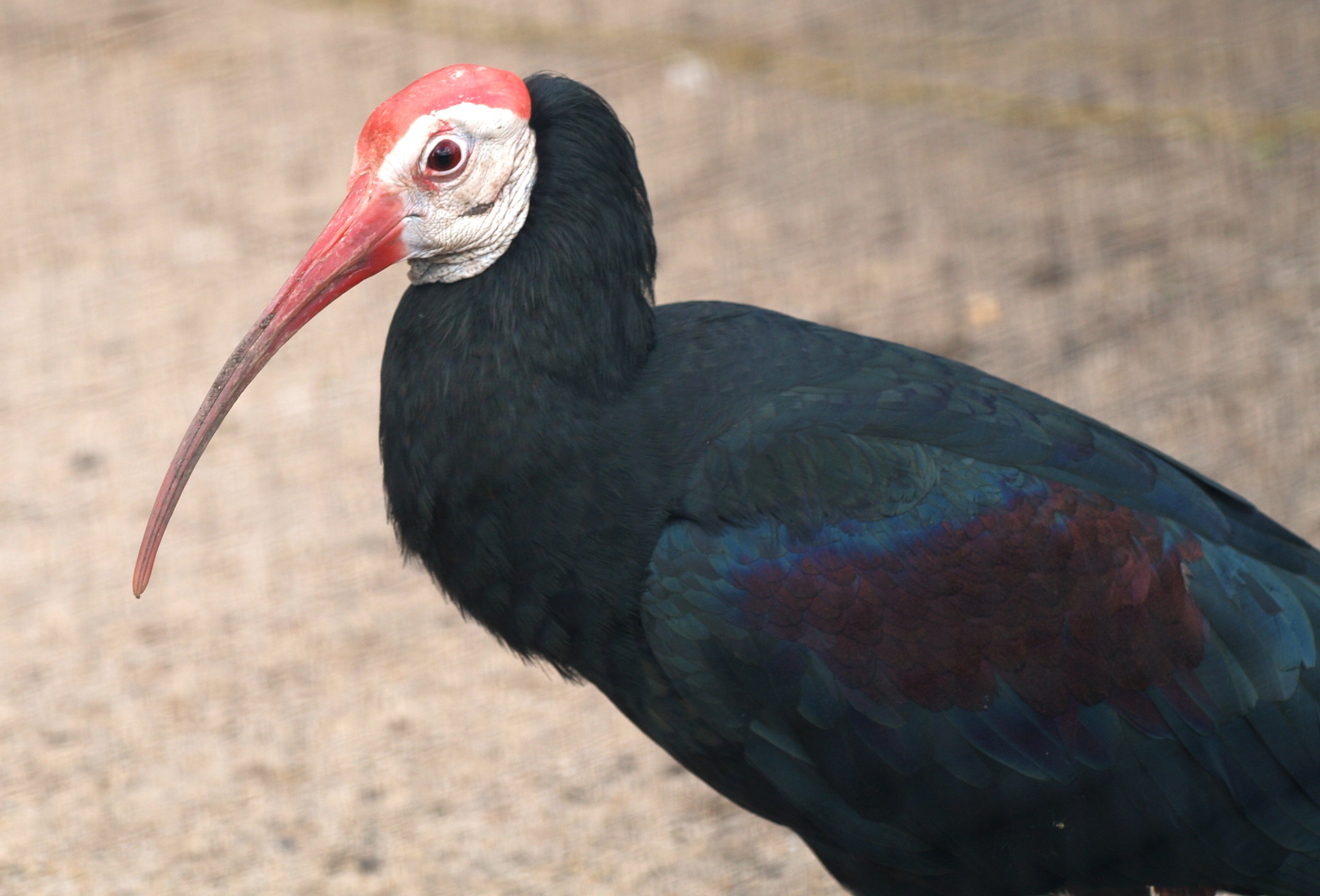
Southern bald ibis

Order: Pelecaniformes Family: Threskiornithidae

Threskiornithidae is a family of large terrestrial and wading birds which includes the ibises and spoonbills. They have long, broad wings with 11 primary and about 20 secondary feathers. They are strong fliers and despite their size and weight, very capable soarers.

Common name	Binomial	Status
Glossy ibis	Plegadis falcinellus	
African sacred ibis	Threskiornis aethiopicus	
Southern bald ibis	Geronticus calvus	SLE endemic (see note); (Note: Clements lists this species as endemic to South Africa alone) vulnerable
Hadada ibis	Bostrychia hagedash	
African spoonbill	Platalea alba	

== Secretarybird ==
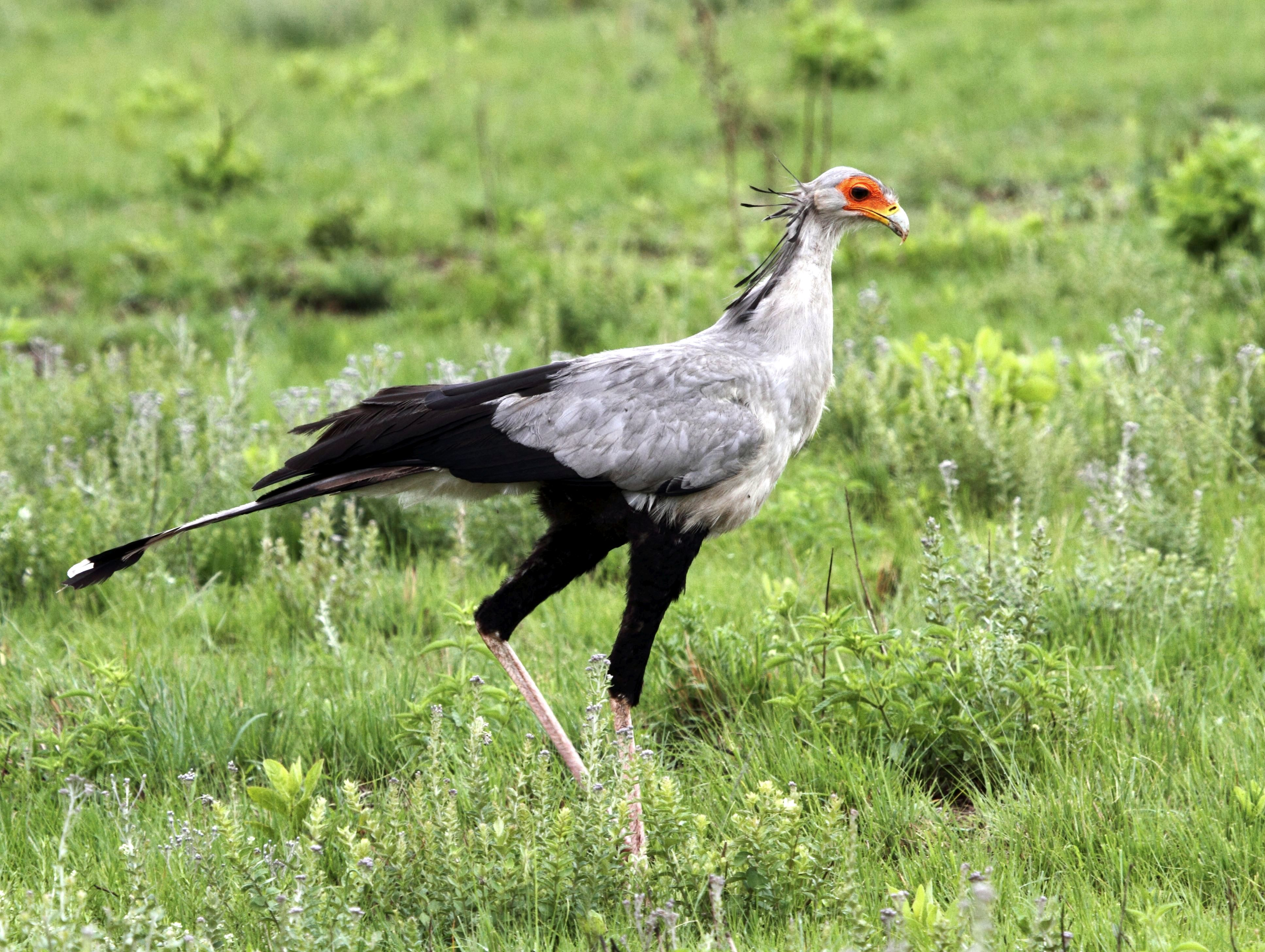
Secretarybird

Order: Accipitriformes Family: Sagittariidae

The secretarybird is a bird of prey easily distinguished from other raptors by its long crane-like legs.

Common name	Binomial	Status
Secretarybird	Sagittarius serpentarius	Endangered

== Osprey ==
Order: Accipitriformes Family: Pandionidae

The family Pandionidae contains only one species, the osprey. The osprey is a medium-large raptor which is a specialist fish-eater with a worldwide distribution.

Common name	Binomial	Status
Osprey	Pandion haliaetus	

== Hawks, eagles, and kites ==
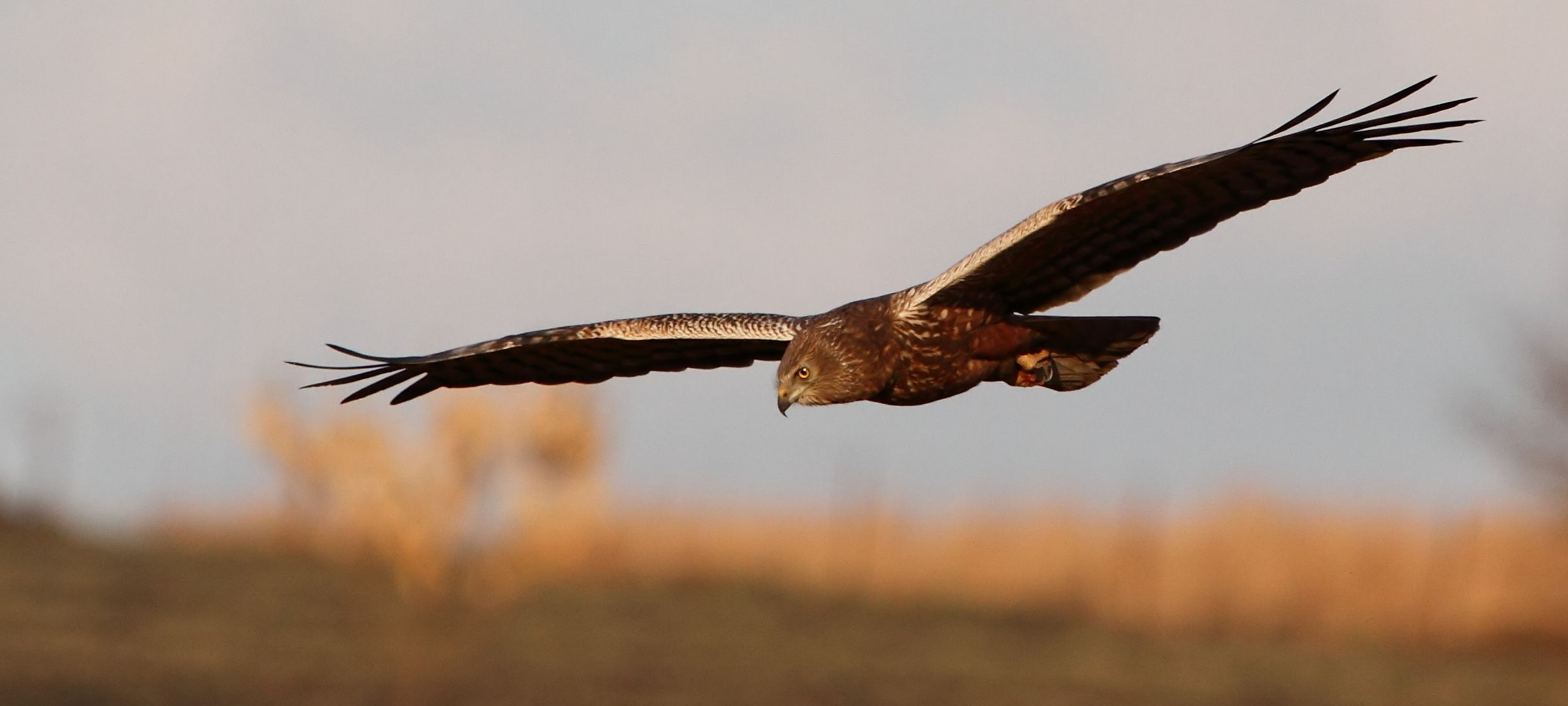
African marsh-harrier

Order: Accipitriformes Family: Accipitridae

Accipitridae is a family of birds of prey, which includes hawks, eagles, kites, harriers, and Old World vultures. These birds have powerful hooked beaks for tearing flesh from their prey, strong legs, powerful talons, and keen eyesight.

Common name	Binomial	Status
Black-winged kite	Elanus caeruleus	
African harrier-hawk	Polyboroides typus	
Palm-nut vulture	Gypohierax angolensis	
Bearded vulture	Gypaetus barbatus	Near threatened
Egyptian vulture	Neophron percnopterus	Vagrant; endangered
European honey-buzzard	Pernis apivorus	
Oriental honey-buzzard	Pernis ptilorhynchus	Vagrant
African cuckoo-hawk	Aviceda cuculoides	
White-headed vulture	Trigonoceps occipitalis	Critically endangered
Lappet-faced vulture	Torgos tracheliotos	Endangered
Hooded vulture	Necrosyrtes monachus	Critically endangered
White-backed vulture	Gyps africanus	Critically endangered
Rüppell's griffon	Gyps rueppelli	Vagrant; critically endangered
Cape griffon	Gyps coprotheres	Endangered
Bateleur	Terathopius ecaudatus	Near threatened
Black-chested snake-eagle	Circaetus pectoralis	
Brown snake-eagle	Circaetus cinereus	
Fasciated snake-eagle	Circaetus fasciolatus	Near threatened
Banded snake-eagle	Circaetus cinerascens	Vagrant
Bat hawk	Macheiramphus alcinus	
Crowned eagle	Stephanoaetus coronatus	Near threatened
Martial eagle	Polemaetus bellicosus	Vulnerable
Long-crested eagle	Lophaetus occipitalis	
Lesser spotted eagle	Clanga pomarina	
Wahlberg's eagle	Hieraaetus wahlbergi	
Booted eagle	Hieraaetus pennatus	
Ayres's hawk-eagle	Hieraaetus ayresii	
Tawny eagle	Aquila rapax	
Steppe eagle	Aquila nipalensis	Endangered
Verreaux's eagle	Aquila verreauxii	
African hawk-eagle	Aquila spilogaster	
Lizard buzzard	Kaupifalco monogrammicus	
Dark chanting-goshawk	Melierax metabates	
Pale chanting-goshawk	Melierax canorus	
Gabar goshawk	Micronisus gabar	
Eurasian marsh-harrier	Circus aeruginosus	
African marsh-harrier	Circus ranivorus	
Black harrier	Circus maurus	Endangered
Pallid harrier	Circus macrourus	Near threatened
Montagu's harrier	Circus pygargus	
African goshawk	Accipiter tachiro	
Shikra	Accipiter badius	
Little sparrowhawk	Accipiter minullus	
Ovambo sparrowhawk	Accipiter ovampensis	
Rufous-breasted sparrowhawk	Accipiter rufiventris	
Black goshawk	Accipiter melanoleucus	
Black kite	Milvus migrans	
Yellow-billed kite	Milvus aegyptius	See notes below (Note: Considered a subspecies of the preceding species by Clements; deemed a full species by BLSA) (Note: Johnson JA, Richard T. Watson and David P. Mindell (2005). "Prioritizing species conservation: does the Cape Verde kite exist?" (PDF). Proc. R. Soc. B. 272 (1570): 1365–1371. doi:10.1098/rspb.2005.3098. PMC 1560339. PMID 16006325. Archived from the original (PDF) on 19 December 2010. This mitochondrial study of Milvus kites, employing three genes, determined that the black kite (Milvus m. migrans) of the Eurasian clade differs significantly from the allopatric yellow-billed kite, where the latter could be further subdivided into two groups: those from southern Africa and Madagascar differing from those in central, west and east Africa. These taxa are all distinct, though near-related as in the Eurasian clade. The study revealed besides that the two yellow-billed kite taxa could potentially be assigned species status. In such a three-way split the yellow-billed kite of southern Africa would be named M. parasitus.)
African fish-eagle	Haliaeetus vocifer	
Common buzzard	Buteo buteo	
Forest buzzard	Buteo trizonatus	SLE endemic (see note); (Note: Clements lists this species as endemic to South Africa alone) near threatened
Long-legged buzzard	Buteo rufinus	Vagrant
Red-necked buzzard	Buteo auguralis	Vagrant
Augur buzzard	Buteo augur	Vagrant
Jackal buzzard	Buteo rufofuscus	

== Barn-owls ==
Order: Strigiformes Family: Tytonidae

Barn-owls are medium to large owls with large heads and characteristic heart-shaped faces. They have long strong legs with powerful talons.

Common name	Binomial	Status
African grass-owl	Tyto capensis	
Barn owl	Tyto alba	

== Owls ==
Order: Strigiformes Family: Strigidae

The typical owls are small to large solitary nocturnal birds of prey. They have large forward-facing eyes and ears, a hawk-like beak, and a conspicuous circle of feathers around each eye called a facial disk.

Common name	Binomial	Status
African scops-owl	Otus senegalensis	
Southern white-faced owl	Ptilopsis granti	
Cape eagle-owl	Bubo capensis	
Spotted eagle-owl	Bubo africanus	
Verreaux's eagle-owl	Bubo lacteus	
Pel's fishing-owl	Scotopelia peli	
Pearl-spotted owlet	Glaucidium perlatum	
African barred owlet	Glaucidium capense	
African wood-owl	Strix woodfordii	
Marsh owl	Asio capensis	

== Mousebirds ==
Order: Coliiformes Family: Coliidae

The mousebirds are slender greyish or brown birds with soft, hairlike body feathers and very long thin tails. They are arboreal and scurry through the leaves like rodents in search of berries, fruit, and buds. They are acrobatic and can feed upside down. All species have strong claws and reversible outer toes. They also have crests and stubby bills.

Common name	Binomial	Status
Speckled mousebird	Colius striatus	
White-backed mousebird	Colius colius	
Red-faced mousebird	Urocolius indicus	

== Trogons ==
Order: Trogoniformes Family: Trogonidae

The family Trogonidae includes trogons and quetzals. Found in tropical woodlands worldwide, they feed on insects and fruit, and their broad bills and weak legs reflect their diet and arboreal habits. Although their flight is fast, they are reluctant to fly any distance. Trogons have soft, often colourful, feathers with distinctive male and female plumage.

Common name	Binomial	Status
Narina trogon	Apaloderma narina	

== Hoopoes ==
Order: Bucerotiformes Family: Upupidae

Hoopoes have black, white, and orangey-pink colouring with a large erectile crest on their head.

Common name	Binomial	Status
Hoopoe	Upupa africana	

== Woodhoopoes and scimitarbills ==
Order: Bucerotiformes Family: Phoeniculidae

The woodhoopoes are related to the hoopoes, hornbills, and ground-hornbills. They most resemble the hoopoes with their long curved bills, used to probe for insects, and short rounded wings. However, they differ in that they have metallic plumage, often blue, green, or purple, and lack an erectile crest.

Common name	Binomial	Status
Green woodhoopoe	Phoeniculus purpureus	
Common scimitarbill	Rhinopomastus cyanomelas	

== Ground-hornbills ==
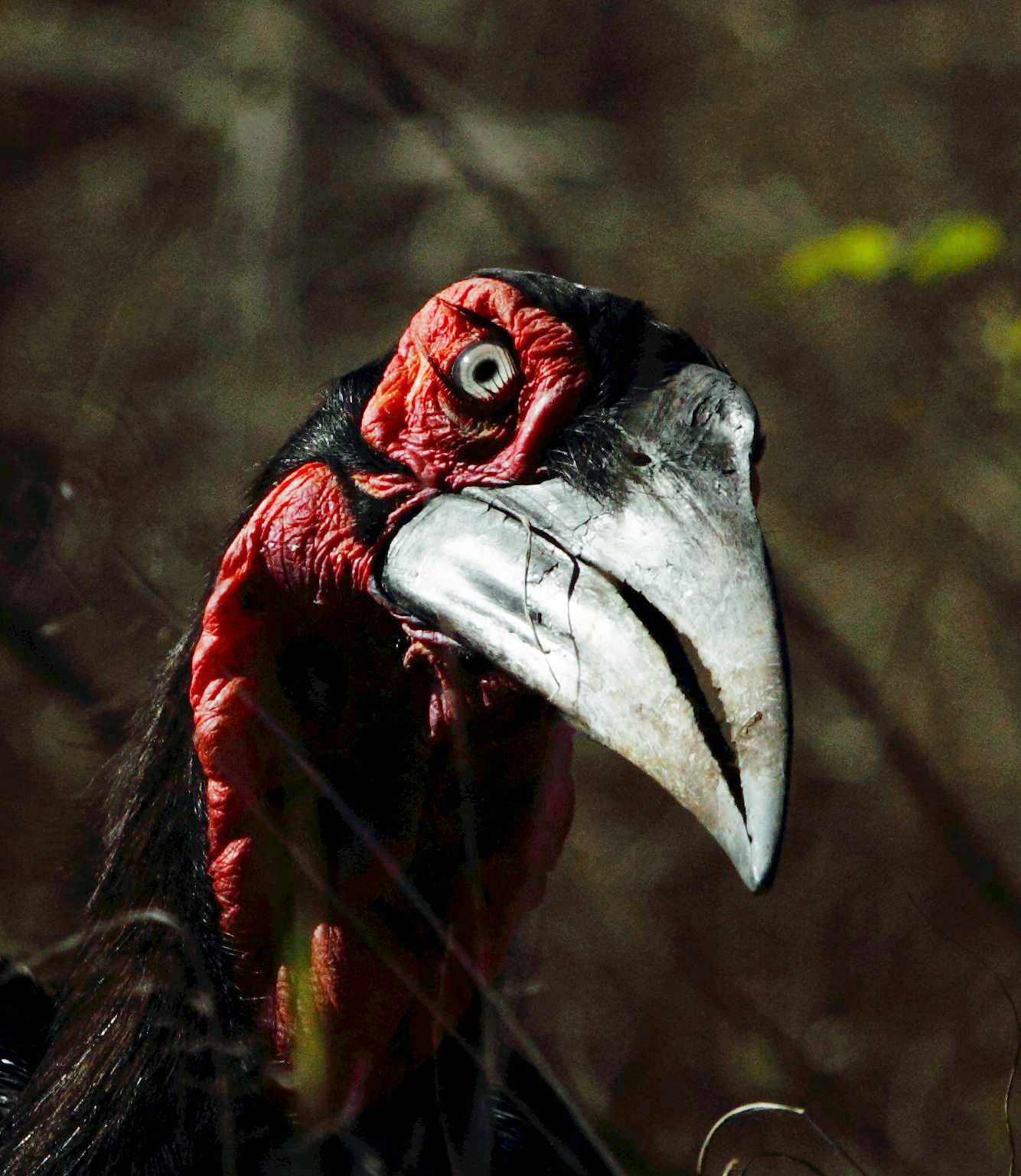
Southern ground-hornbill

Order: Bucerotiformes Family: Bucorvidae

The ground-hornbills are terrestrial birds which feed almost entirely on insects, other birds, snakes, and amphibians.

Common name	Binomial	Status
Southern ground-hornbill	Bucorvus leadbeateri	Vulnerable

== Hornbills ==
Order: Bucerotiformes Family: Bucerotidae

Hornbills are a group of birds whose bill is shaped like a cow's horn, but without a twist, sometimes with a casque on the upper mandible. Frequently, the bill is brightly coloured.

Common name	Binomial	Status
Crowned hornbill	Lophoceros alboterminatus	
African grey hornbill	Lophoceros nasutus	
Southern yellow-billed hornbill	Tockus leucomelas	
Southern red-billed hornbill	Tockus rufirostris	
Trumpeter hornbill	Bycanistes bucinator	

== Kingfishers ==
Order: Coraciiformes Family: Alcedinidae

Kingfishers are medium-sized birds with large heads, long pointed bills, short legs, and stubby tails.

Common name	Binomial	Status
Half-collared kingfisher	Alcedo semitorquata	
Malachite kingfisher	Corythornis cristatus	
African pygmy kingfisher	Ispidina picta	
Gray-headed kingfisher	Halcyon leucocephala	
Woodland kingfisher	Halcyon senegalensis	
Mangrove kingfisher	Halcyon senegaloides	
Brown-hooded kingfisher	Halcyon albiventris	
Striped kingfisher	Halcyon chelicuti	
Giant kingfisher	Megaceryle maxima	
Pied kingfisher	Ceryle rudis	

== Bee-eaters ==
Order: Coraciiformes Family: Meropidae

The bee-eaters are a group of coraciiform birds in the family Meropidae. Most species are found in Africa but others occur in southern Europe, Madagascar, Australia, and New Guinea. They are characterised by richly coloured plumage, slender bodies, and usually elongated central tail feathers. All are colourful and have long downturned bills and pointed wings, which give them a swallow-like appearance when seen from afar.

Common name	Binomial	Status
White-fronted bee-eater	Merops bullockoides	
Little bee-eater	Merops pusillus	
Swallow-tailed bee-eater	Merops hirundineus	
White-throated bee-eater	Merops albicollis	Vagrant
Blue-cheeked bee-eater	Merops persicus	
Madagascar bee-eater	Merops superciliosus	Vagrant
European bee-eater	Merops apiaster	
Southern carmine bee-eater	Merops nubicoides	

== Rollers ==
Order: Coraciiformes Family: Coraciidae

Rollers resemble crows in size and build, but are more closely related to the kingfishers and bee-eaters. They share the colourful appearance of those groups with blues and browns predominating. The two inner front toes are connected, but the outer toe is not.

Common name	Binomial	Status
European roller	Coracias garrulus	
Lilac-breasted roller	Coracias caudatus	
Racket-tailed roller	Coracias spatulatus	Vagrant
Rufous-crowned roller	Coracias naevius	
Broad-billed roller	Eurystomus glaucurus	

== African barbets ==
Order: Piciformes Family: Lybiidae

The barbets are plump birds, with short necks and large heads. They get their name from the bristles which fringe their heavy bills. Most species are brightly coloured.

Common name	Binomial	Status
Crested barbet	Trachyphonus vaillantii	
White-eared barbet	Stactolaema leucotis	
Green barbet	Stactolaema olivacea	
Yellow-rumped tinkerbird	Pogoniulus bilineatus	
Red-fronted tinkerbird	Pogoniulus pusillus	
Yellow-fronted tinkerbird	Pogoniulus chrysoconus	
Pied barbet	Tricholaema leucomelas	
Black-collared barbet	Lybius torquatus	

== Honeyguides ==
Order: Piciformes Family: Indicatoridae

Honeyguides are among the few birds that feed on wax. They are named for the greater honeyguide which leads traditional honey-hunters to bees' nests and, after the hunters have harvested the honey, feeds on the remaining contents of the hive.

Common name	Binomial	Status
Wahlberg's honeyguide	Prodotiscus regulus	
Lesser honeyguide	Indicator minor	
Scaly-throated honeyguide	Indicator variegatus	
Greater honeyguide	Indicator indicator	

== Woodpeckers ==
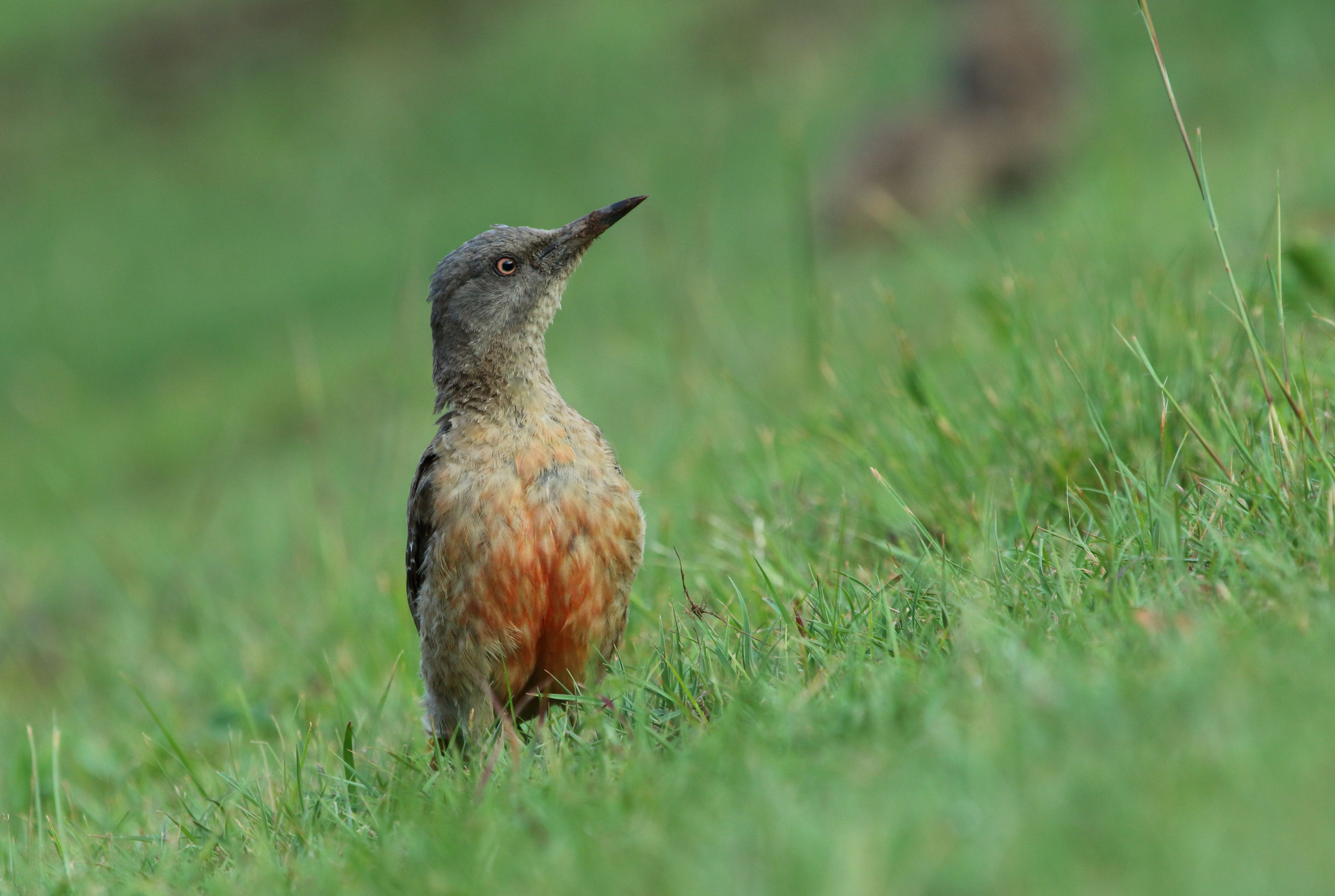
Ground woodpecker

Order: Piciformes Family: Picidae

Woodpeckers are small to medium-sized birds with chisel-like beaks, short legs, stiff tails, and long tongues used for capturing insects. Some species have feet with two toes pointing forward and two backward, while several species have only three toes. Many woodpeckers have the habit of tapping noisily on tree trunks with their beaks.

Common name	Binomial	Status
Rufous-necked wryneck	Jynx ruficollis	
Cardinal woodpecker	Chloropicus fuscescens	
Bearded woodpecker	Chloropicus namaquus	
Olive woodpecker	Chloropicus griseocephalus	
Ground woodpecker	Geocolaptes olivaceus	SLE endemic; near threatened
Bennett's woodpecker	Campethera bennettii	
Knysna woodpecker	Campethera notata	See note; (Note: Clements lists this species as endemic) near threatened
Golden-tailed woodpecker	Campethera abingoni	

== Falcons and caracaras ==
Order: Falconiformes Family: Falconidae

Falconidae is a family of diurnal birds of prey. They differ from hawks, eagles, and kites in that they kill with their beaks instead of their talons.

Common name	Binomial	Status
Pygmy falcon	Polihierax semitorquatus	
Lesser kestrel	Falco naumanni	Vulnerable
Rock kestrel	Falco rupicolus	
Greater kestrel	Falco rupicoloides	
Dickinson's kestrel	Falco dickinsoni	
Red-necked falcon	Falco chicquera	
Red-footed falcon	Falco vespertinus	Near threatened; winter migrant
Amur falcon	Falco amurensis	Winter migrant
Eleonora's falcon	Falco eleonorae	Vagrant
Sooty falcon	Falco concolor	Near threatened
Eurasian hobby	Falco subbuteo	
African hobby	Falco cuvierii	Vagrant
Lanner falcon	Falco biarmicus	
Peregrine falcon	Falco peregrinus	
Taita falcon	Falco fasciinucha	Vulnerable

== Old World parrots ==
Order: Psittaciformes Family: Psittaculidae

Characteristic features of parrots include a strong curved bill, an upright stance, strong legs, and clawed zygodactyl feet. Many parrots are vividly coloured, and some are multi-coloured. In size they range from 8 cm (3.1 in) to 1 m (3.3 ft) in length. Old World parrots are found from Africa east across south and southeast Asia and Oceania to Australia and New Zealand.

Common name	Binomial	Status
Rose-ringed parakeet	Psittacula krameri	Introduced
Rosy-faced lovebird	Agapornis roseicollis	

== African and New World parrots ==
Order: Psittaciformes Family: Psittacidae

Parrots are small to large birds with a characteristic curved beak. Their upper mandibles have slight mobility in the joint with the skull and they have a generally erect stance. All parrots are zygodactyl, having the four toes on each foot placed two at the front and two to the back. Most of the more than 150 species in this family are found in the New World.

Common name	Binomial	Status
Brown-necked parrot	Poicephalus fuscicollis	
Cape parrot	Poicephalus robustus	Endemic; vulnerable
Meyer's parrot	Poicephalus meyeri	
Brown-headed parrot	Poicephalus cryptoxanthus	

== African and green broadbills ==
Order: Passeriformes Family: Calyptomenidae

The broadbills are small, brightly coloured birds which feed on fruit and also take insects in flycatcher fashion, snapping their broad bills. Their habitat is canopies of wet forests.

Common name	Binomial	Status
African broadbill	Smithornis capensis	

== Pittas ==
Order: Passeriformes Family: Pittidae

Pittas are medium-sized by passerine standards and are stocky, with fairly long, strong legs, short tails, and stout bills. Many are brightly coloured. They spend the majority of their time on wet forest floors, eating snails, insects, and similar invertebrates.

Common name	Binomial	Status
African pitta	Pitta angolensis	Vagrant

== Cuckooshrikes ==
Order: Passeriformes Family: Campephagidae

The cuckooshrikes are small to medium-sized passerine birds. They are predominantly greyish with white and black, although some species are brightly coloured.

Common name	Binomial	Status
Gray cuckooshrike	Coracina caesia	
White-breasted cuckooshrike	Coracina pectoralis	
Black cuckooshrike	Campephaga flava	

== Old world orioles ==
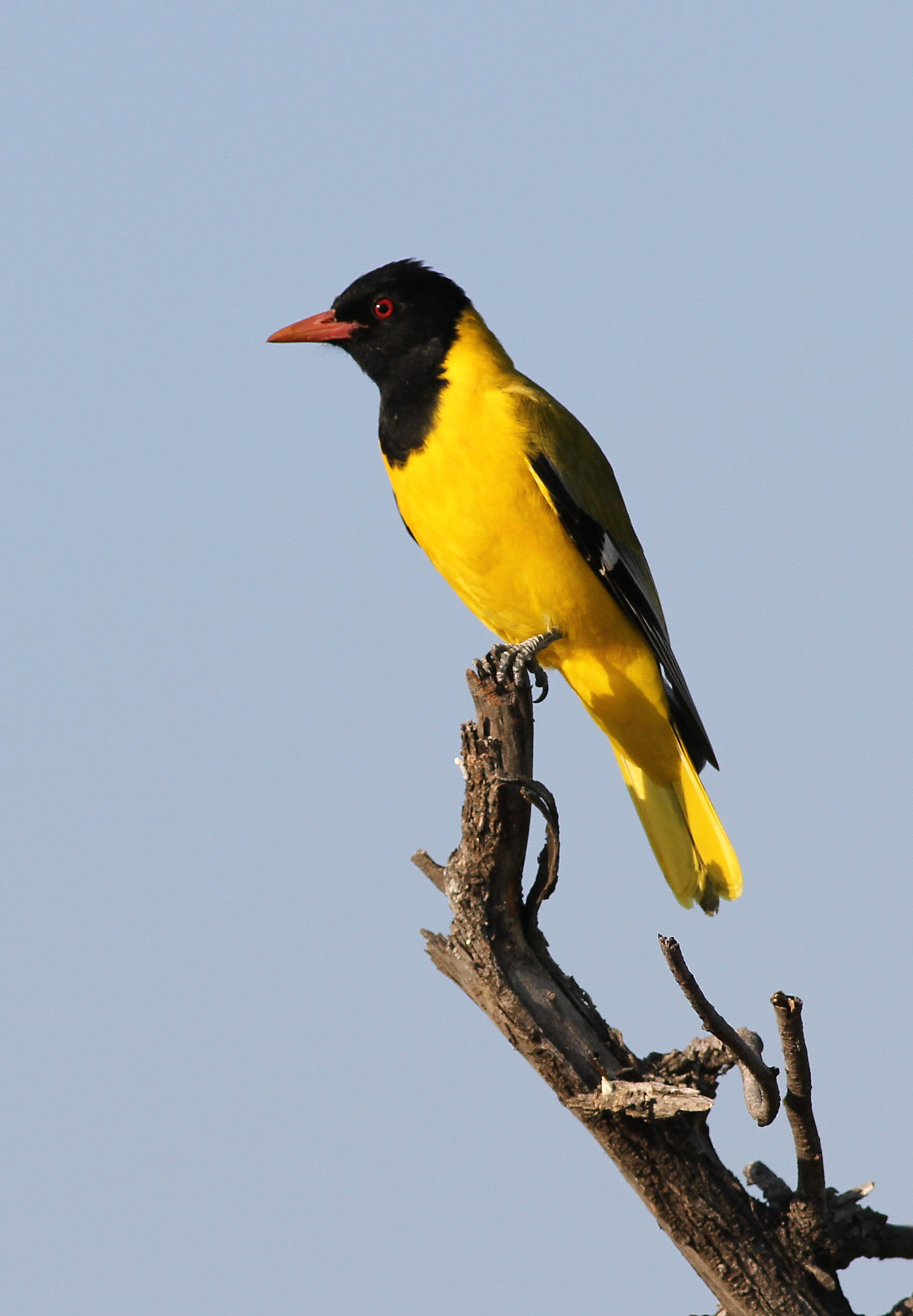
Black-headed oriole

Order: Passeriformes Family: Oriolidae

The Old World orioles are colourful passerine birds. They are not related to the New World orioles though they appear similar.

Common name	Binomial	Status
Eurasian golden oriole	Oriolus oriolus	
African golden oriole	Oriolus auratus	
African black-headed oriole	Oriolus larvatus	

== Wattle-eyes and batises ==
Order: Passeriformes Family: Platysteiridae

The wattle-eyes, or puffback flycatchers, are small stout passerine birds of the African tropics. They get their name from the brightly coloured fleshy eye decorations found in most species in this group.

Common name	Binomial	Status
Black-throated wattle-eye	Platysteira peltata	
Cape batis	Batis capensis	
Woodward's batis	Batis fratrum	
Chinspot batis	Batis molitor	
Pririt batis	Batis pririt	

== Vangas, helmetshrikes, and allies ==
Order: Passeriformes Family: Vangidae

The helmetshrikes are similar in build to the shrikes, but tend to be colourful species with distinctive crests or other head ornaments, such as wattles, from which they get their name.

Common name	Binomial	Status
White helmetshrike	Prionops plumatus	
Retz's helmetshrike	Prionops retzii	
Chestnut-fronted helmetshrike	Prionops scopifrons	Vagrant
Black-and-white shrike-flycatcher	Bias musicus	Vagrant

== Bushshrikes and allies ==
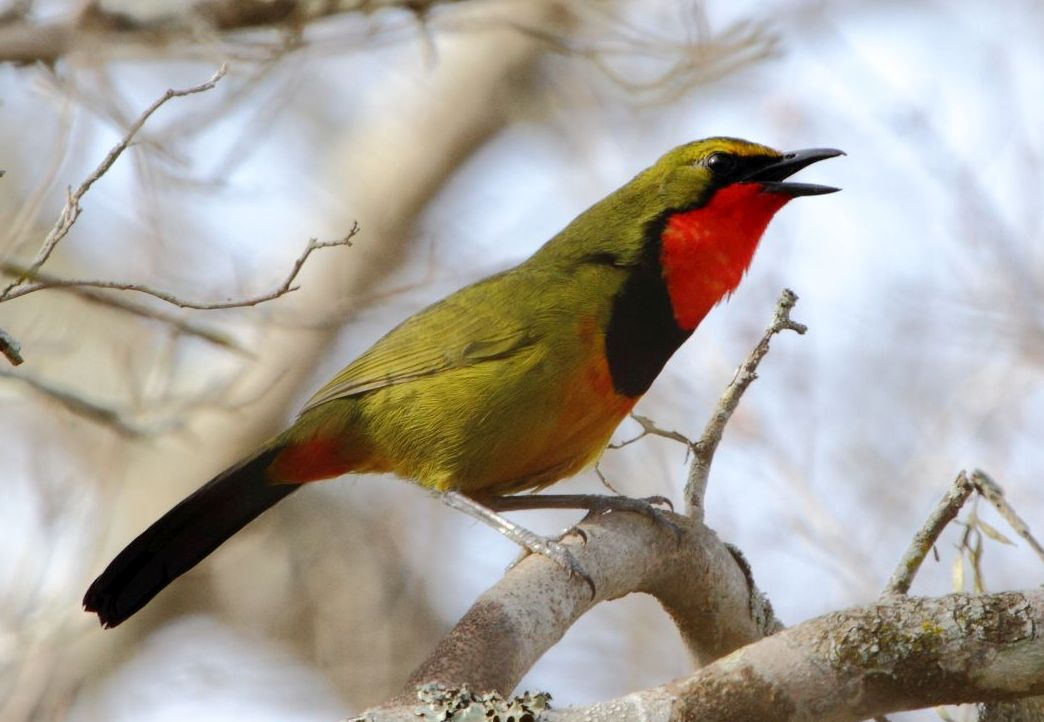
Four-coloured bushshrike

Order: Passeriformes Family: Malaconotidae

Bushshrikes are similar in habits to shrikes, hunting insects and other small prey from a perch on a bush. Although similar in build to the shrikes, these tend to be either colourful species or largely black; some species are quite secretive.

Common name	Binomial	Status
Brubru	Nilaus afer	
Black-backed puffback	Dryoscopus cubla	
Black-crowned tchagra	Tchagra senegalus	
Brown-crowned tchagra	Tchagra australis	
Southern tchagra	Tchagra tchagra	
Tropical boubou	Laniarius major	
Southern boubou	Laniarius ferrugineus	
Crimson-breasted gonolek	Laniarius atrococcineus	
Bokmakierie	Telophorus zeylonus	
Sulphur-breasted bushshrike	Telophorus sulfureopectus	
Olive bushshrike	Telophorus olivaceus	
Black-fronted bushshrike	Telophorus nigrifrons	
Four-coloured bushshrike	Telophorus viridis	
Gray-headed bushshrike	Malaconotus blanchoti	

== Drongos ==
Order: Passeriformes Family: Dicruridae

The drongos are mostly black or dark grey in colour, sometimes with metallic tints. They have long forked tails, and some Asian species have elaborate tail decorations. They have short legs and sit very upright when perched, like a shrike. They flycatch or take prey from the ground.

Common name	Binomial	Status
Common square-tailed drongo	Dicrurus ludwigii	
Fork-tailed drongo	Dicrurus adsimilis	

== Monarch flycatchers ==
Order: Passeriformes Family: Monarchidae

The monarch flycatchers are small to medium-sized insectivorous passerines which hunt by flycatching.

Common name	Binomial	Status
African crested-flycatcher	Trochocercus cyanomelas	
African paradise-flycatcher	Terpsiphone viridis	

== Shrikes ==
Order: Passeriformes Family: Laniidae

Shrikes are passerine birds known for their habit of catching other birds and small animals and impaling the uneaten portions of their bodies on thorns. A shrike's beak is hooked, like that of a typical bird of prey.

Common name	Binomial	Status
Red-backed shrike	Lanius collurio	
Red-tailed shrike	Lanius phoenicuroides	Vagrant
Isabelline shrike	Lanius isabellinus	Vagrant
Lesser grey shrike	Lanius minor	Winter migrant
Magpie shrike	Lanius melanoleucus	
Southern fiscal	Lanius collaris	
Woodchat shrike	Lanius senator	Vagrant
White-crowned shrike	Eurocephalus anguitimens	

== Crows, jays, and magpies ==
Order: Passeriformes Family: Corvidae

The family Corvidae includes crows, ravens, jays, choughs, magpies, treepies, nutcrackers, and ground jays. Corvids are above average in size among the Passeriformes, and some of the larger species show high levels of intelligence.

Common name	Binomial	Status
House crow	Corvus splendens	Introduced
Cape crow	Corvus capensis	
Pied crow	Corvus albus	
White-necked raven	Corvus albicollis	

== Rockjumpers ==
Order: Passeriformes Family: Chaetopidae

These two species are the only ones in their family. They are primarily insectivores, but cape rockjumpers also eat small vertebrates.

Common name	Binomial	Status
Cape rockjumper	Chaetops frenatus	Endemic; near threatened
Drakensberg rockjumper	Chaetops aurantius	SLE endemic; near threatened

== Hyliotas ==
Order: Passeriformes Family: Hyliotidae

The members of this small family, all of genus Hyliota, are birds of the forest canopy. They tend to feed in mixed-species flocks.

Common name	Binomial	Status
Southern hyliota	Hyliota australis	Vagrant

== Fairy flycatchers ==
Order: Passeriformes Family: Stenostiridae

Most of the species of this small family are found in Africa, though a few inhabit tropical Asia. They are not closely related to other birds called "flycatchers".

Common name	Binomial	Status
Fairy flycatcher	Stenostira scita	

== Tits, chickadees, and titmice ==
Order: Passeriformes Family: Paridae

The Paridae are mainly small stocky woodland species with short stout bills. Some have crests. They are adaptable birds, with a mixed diet including seeds and insects.

Common name	Binomial	Status
Southern black-tit	Melaniparus niger	
Ashy tit	Melaniparus cinerascens	
Gray tit	Melaniparus afer	

== Penduline-tits ==
Order: Passeriformes Family: Remizidae

The penduline-tits are a group of small passerine birds related to the true tits. They are insectivores.

Common name	Binomial	Status
African penduline-tit	Anthoscopus caroli	
Southern penduline-tit	Anthoscopus minutus	

== Larks ==
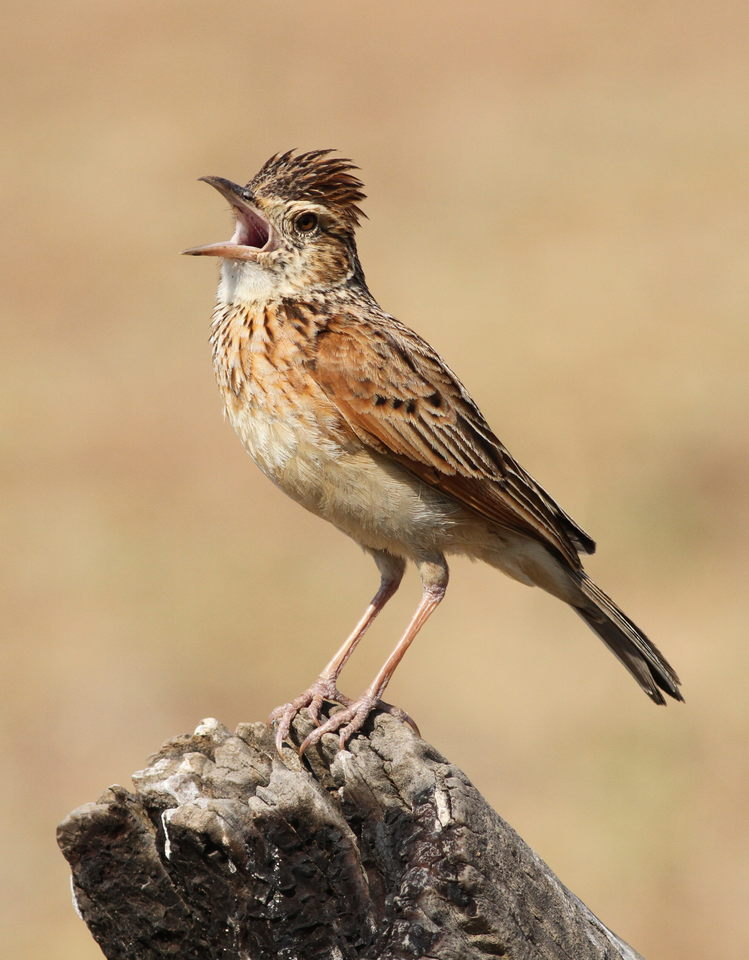
Rufous-naped lark

Order: Passeriformes Family: Alaudidae

Larks are small terrestrial birds with often extravagant songs and display flights. Most larks are fairly dull in appearance. Their food is insects and seeds.

Common name	Binomial	Status
Spike-heeled lark	Chersomanes albofasciata	
Short-clawed lark	Certhilauda chuana	
Karoo long-billed lark	Certhilauda subcoronata	
Eastern long-billed lark	Certhilauda semitorquata	SLE endemic (see note) (Note: Clements lists this species as endemic to South Africa alone)
Cape lark	Certhilauda curvirostris	Endemic (see note) (Note: Clements lists this species as also inhabiting Namibia)
Dusky lark	Pinarocorys nigricans	
Black-eared sparrow-lark	Eremopterix australis	
Chestnut-backed sparrow-lark	Eremopterix leucotis	
Gray-backed sparrow-lark	Eremopterix verticalis	
Sabota lark	Calendulauda sabota	
Fawn-coloured lark	Calendulauda africanoides	
Karoo lark	Calendulauda albescens	Endemic
Red lark	Calendulauda burra	Endemic; vulnerable
Barlow's lark	Calendulauda barlowi	
Rudd's lark	Heteromirafra ruddi	Endemic; endangered
Cape clapper lark	Mirafra apiata	
Eastern clapper lark	Mirafra fasciolata	
Rufous-naped lark	Mirafra africana	
Flappet lark	Mirafra rufocinnamomea	
Monotonous lark	Mirafra passerina	
Latakoo lark	Mirafra cheniana	
Red-capped lark	Calandrella cinerea	
Stark's lark	Spizocorys starki	
Sclater's lark	Spizocorys sclateri	Near threatened
Pink-billed lark	Spizocorys conirostris	
Botha's lark	Spizocorys fringillaris	Endemic; endangered
Large-billed lark	Galerida magnirostris	

== Nicators ==
Order: Passeriformes Family: Nicatoridae

The nicators are shrike-like, with hooked bills. They are endemic to sub-Saharan Africa.

Common name	Binomial	Status
Eastern nicator	Nicator gularis	

== African warblers ==
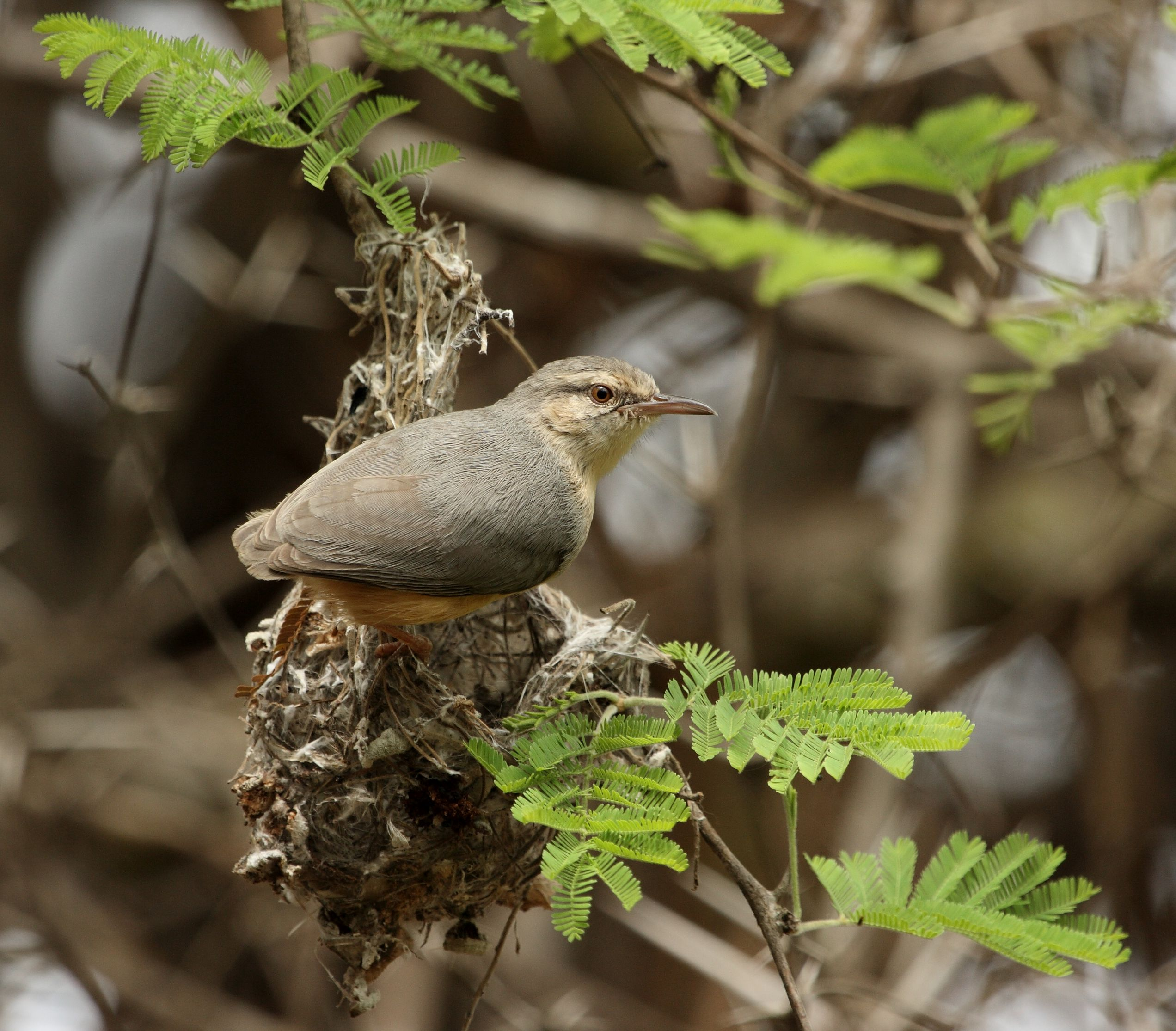
Cape crombec

Order: Passeriformes Family: Macrosphenidae

African warblers are small to medium-sized insectivores which are found in a wide variety of habitats south of the Sahara.

Common name	Binomial	Status
Cape crombec	Sylvietta rufescens	
Cape grassbird	Sphenoeacus afer	
Victorin's warbler	Cryptillas victorini	Endemic

== Cisticolas and allies ==
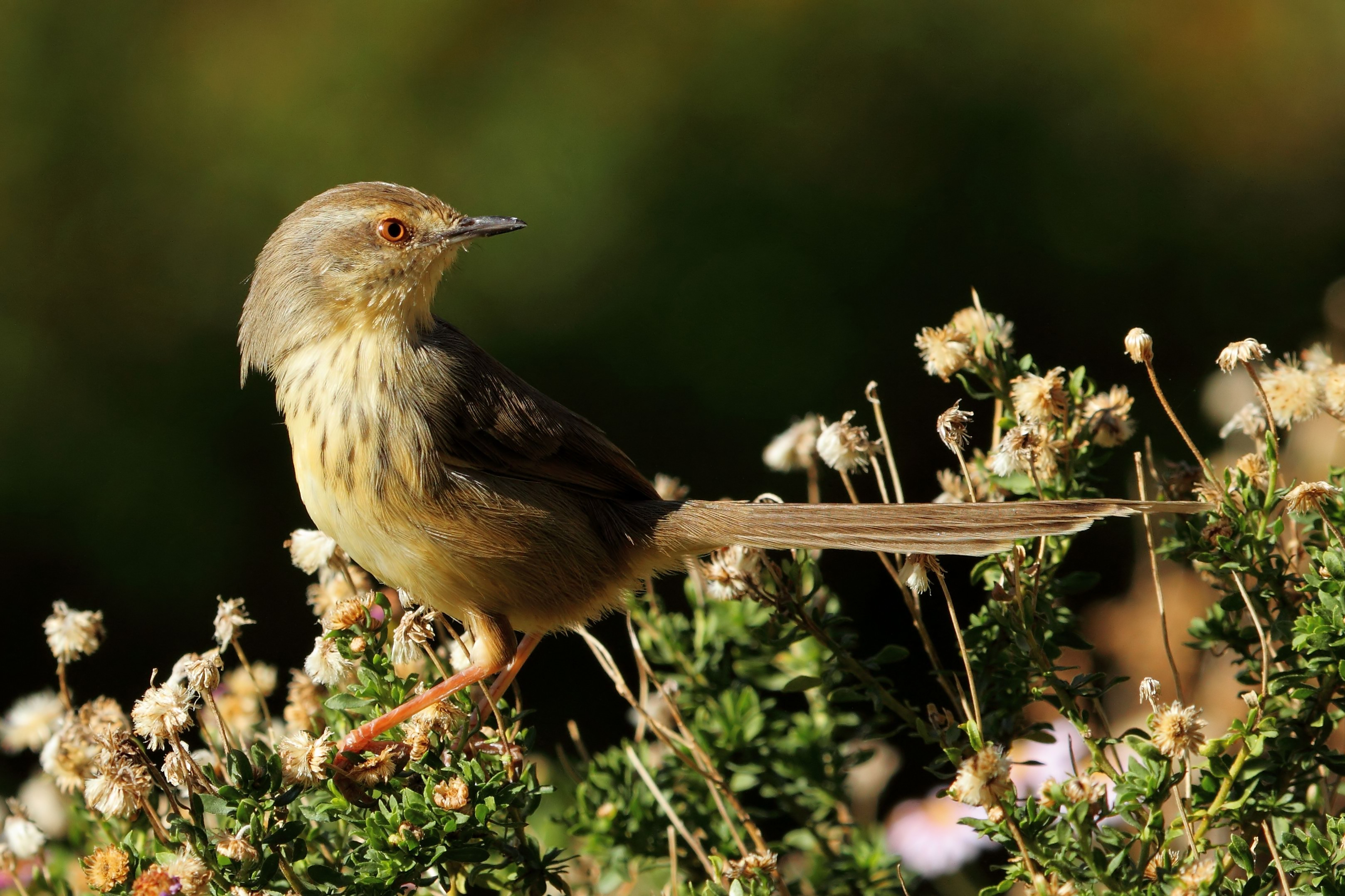
Drakensberg prinia

Order: Passeriformes Family: Cisticolidae

The Cisticolidae are warblers found mainly in warmer southern regions of the Old World. They are generally very small birds of drab brown or grey appearance found in open country such as grassland or scrub.

Common name	Binomial	Status
Yellow-bellied eremomela	Eremomela icteropygialis	
Greencap eremomela	Eremomela scotops	
Yellow-rumped eremomela	Eremomela gregalis	
Burnt-neck eremomela	Eremomela usticollis	
Namaqua warbler	Phragmacia substriata	
Stierling's wren-warbler	Calamonastes stierlingi	
Barred wren-warbler	Calamonastes fasciolatus	
Green-backed camaroptera	Camaroptera brachyura	
Bar-throated apalis	Apalis thoracica	
Yellow-breasted apalis	Apalis flavida	
Rudd's apalis	Apalis ruddi	
Tawny-flanked prinia	Prinia subflava	
Black-chested prinia	Prinia flavicans	
Karoo prinia	Prinia maculosa	
Drakensberg prinia	Prinia hypoxantha	SLE endemic
Kopje warbler	Euryptila subcinnamomea	
Rufous-eared warbler	Malcorus pectoralis	
Red-faced cisticola	Cisticola erythrops	
Rock-loving cisticola	Cisticola aberrans	
Rattling cisticola	Cisticola chiniana	
Tinkling cisticola	Cisticola rufilatus	
Red-headed cisticola	Cisticola subruficapilla	
Wailing cisticola	Cisticola lais	
Rufous-winged cisticola	Cisticola galactotes	
Levaillant's cisticola	Cisticola tinniens	
Croaking cisticola	Cisticola natalensis	
Piping cisticola	Cisticola fulvicapilla	
Zitting cisticola	Cisticola juncidis	
Desert cisticola	Cisticola aridulus	
Cloud cisticola	Cisticola textrix	
Pale-crowned cisticola	Cisticola cinnamomeus	
Wing-snapping cisticola	Cisticola ayresii	

== Reed warblers and allies ==
Order: Passeriformes Family: Acrocephalidae

The members of this family are usually rather large for "warblers". Most are rather plain olivaceous brown above with much yellow to beige below. They are usually found in open woodland, reedbeds, or tall grass. The family occurs mostly in southern to western Eurasia and surroundings, but it also ranges far into the Pacific, with some species in Africa.

Common name	Binomial	Status
African yellow-warbler	Iduna natalensis	
Upcher's warbler	Hippolais languida	Vagrant
Olive-tree warbler	Hippolais olivetorum	Winter migrant
Icterine warbler	Hippolais icterina	
Sedge warbler	Acrocephalus schoenobaenus	
Marsh warbler	Acrocephalus palustris	Winter migrant
Common reed warbler	Acrocephalus scirpaceus	
Basra reed warbler	Acrocephalus griseldis	Vagrant
Lesser swamp warbler	Acrocephalus gracilirostris	
Great reed warbler	Acrocephalus arundinaceus	

== Grassbirds and allies ==
Order: Passeriformes Family: Locustellidae

Locustellidae are a family of small insectivorous songbirds found mainly in Eurasia, Africa, and the Australian region. They are smallish birds with tails that are usually long and pointed, and tend to be drab brownish or buffy all over.

Common name	Binomial	Status
River warbler	Locustella fluviatilis	
Fan-tailed grassbird	Catriscus brevirostris	
Knysna warbler	Bradypterus sylvaticus	Endemic; vulnerable
Barratt's warbler	Bradypterus barratti	
Little rush warbler	Bradypterus baboecala	

== Swallows ==
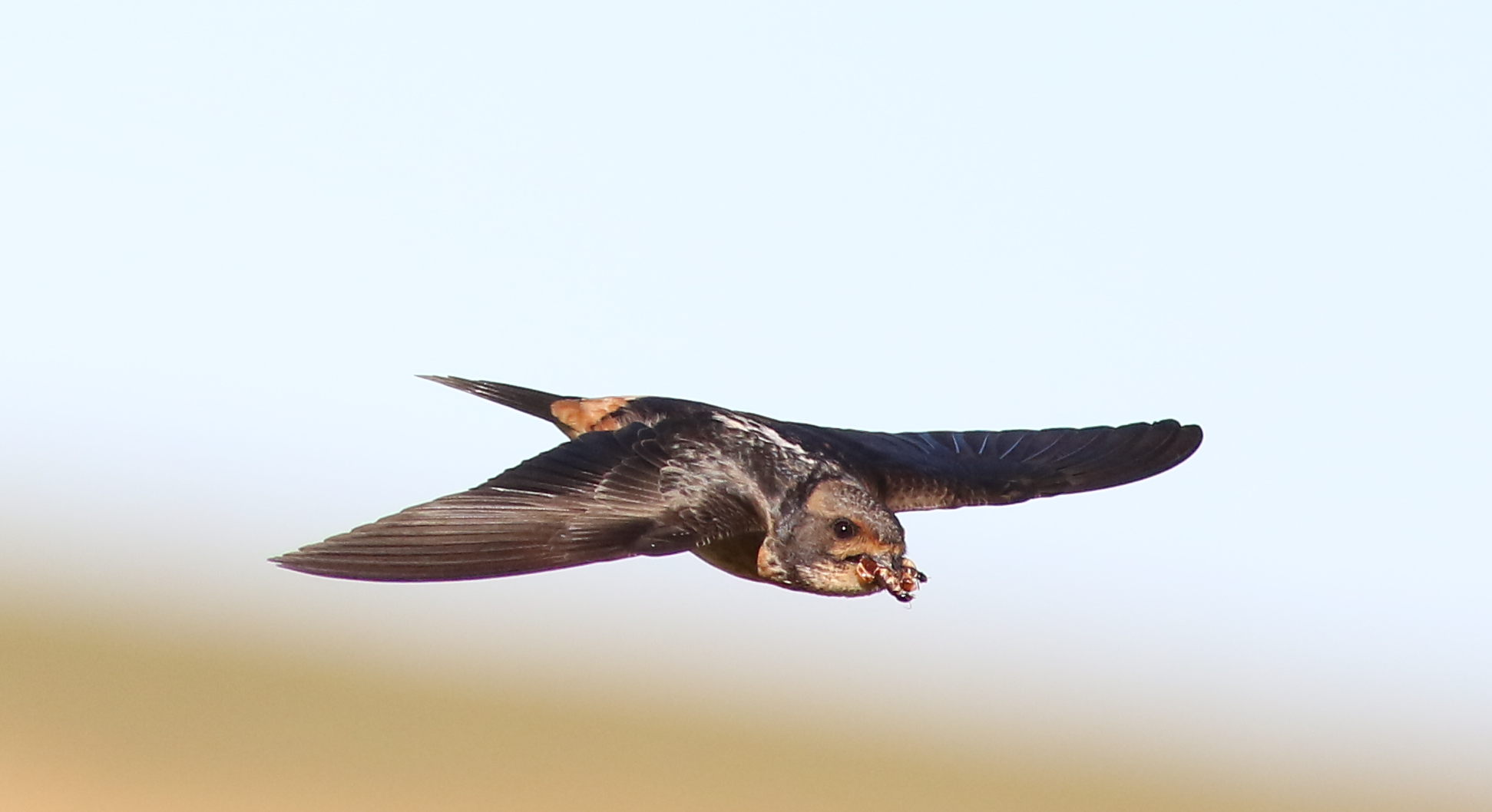
South African swallow

Order: Passeriformes Family: Hirundinidae

The family Hirundinidae is adapted to aerial feeding. They have a slender streamlined body, long pointed wings, and a short bill with a wide gape. The feet are adapted to perching rather than walking, and the front toes are partially joined at the base.

Common name	Binomial	Status
Plain martin	Riparia paludicola	
Bank swallow	Riparia riparia	
Banded martin	Neophedina cincta	
Mascarene martin	Phedina borbonica	Vagrant
Rock martin	Ptyonoprogne fuligula	
Barn swallow	Hirundo rustica	
White-throated swallow	Hirundo albigularis	
Wire-tailed swallow	Hirundo smithii	
Pearl-breasted swallow	Hirundo dimidiata	
Montane blue swallow	Hirundo atrocaerulea	Vulnerable
Greater striped swallow	Cecropis cucullata	
Red-rumped swallow	Cecropis daurica	Vagrant
Lesser striped swallow	Cecropis abyssinica	
Rufous-chested swallow	Cecropis semirufa	
Mosque swallow	Cecropis senegalensis	
South African swallow	Petrochelidon spilodera	
Common house-martin	Delichon urbicum	
Black sawwing	Psalidoprocne pristoptera	
Gray-rumped swallow	Pseudhirundo griseopyga	

== Bulbuls ==
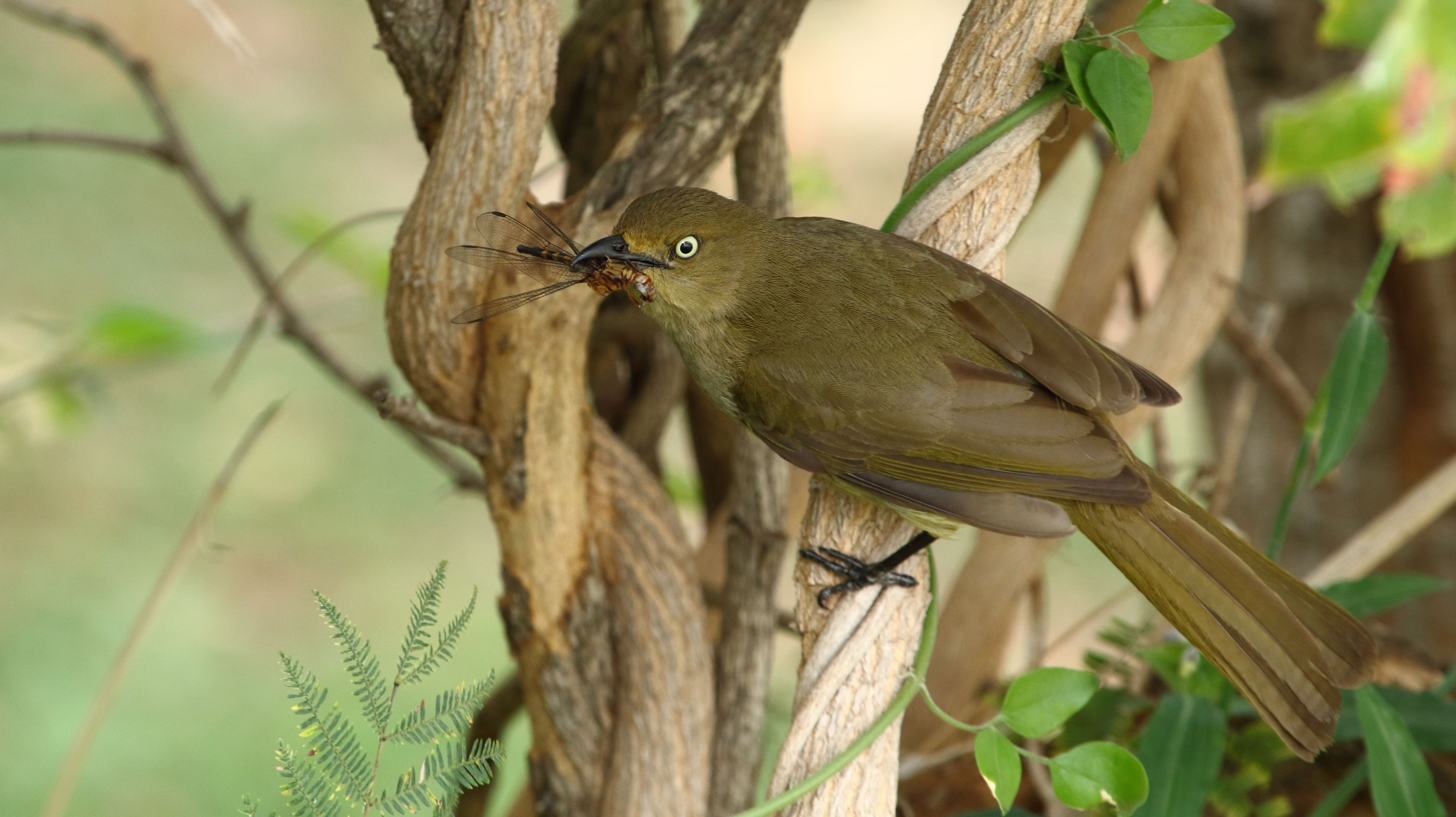
Sombre greenbul

Order: Passeriformes Family: Pycnonotidae

Bulbuls are medium-sized songbirds. Some are colourful with yellow, red, or orange vents, cheeks, throats or supercilia, but most are drab, with uniform olive-brown to black plumage. Some species have distinct crests.

Common name	Binomial	Status
Sombre greenbul	Andropadus importunus	
Yellow-bellied greenbul	Chlorocichla flaviventris	
Terrestrial brownbul	Phyllastrephus terrestris	
Yellow-streaked greenbul	Phyllastrephus flavostriatus	
Common bulbul	Pycnonotus barbatus	
Black-fronted bulbul	Pycnonotus nigricans	
Cape bulbul	Pycnonotus capensis	Endemic

== Leaf warblers ==
Order: Passeriformes Family: Phylloscopidae

Leaf warblers are a family of small insectivorous birds found mostly in Eurasia and ranging into Wallacea and Africa. The species are of various sizes, often green-plumaged above and yellow below, or more subdued with greyish-green to greyish-brown colours.

Common name	Binomial	Status
Wood warbler	Phylloscopus sibilatrix	Vagrant
Willow warbler	Phylloscopus trochilus	
Yellow-throated woodland-warbler	Phylloscopus ruficapillus	
Green warbler	Phylloscopus nitidus	Vagrant

== Sylviid warblers, parrotbills, and allies ==
Order: Passeriformes Family: Sylviidae

The family Sylviidae ("Old World warblers") is a group of small insectivorous passerine birds. They mainly occur as breeding species, as one common name implies, in Europe, Asia, and, to a lesser extent, Africa. Most are of generally undistinguished appearance, but many have distinctive songs.

Common name	Binomial	Status
Eurasian blackcap	Sylvia atricapilla	Vagrant
Garden warbler	Sylvia borin	
Bush blackcap	Sylvia nigricapillus	Vulnerable
Barred warbler	Curruca nisoria	Vagrant
Layard's warbler	Curruca layardi	
Chestnut-vented warbler	Curruca subcoerulea	
Lesser whitethroat	Curruca curruca	Vagrant
Greater whitethroat	Curruca communis	

== White-eyes, yuhinas, and allies ==
Order: Passeriformes Family: Zosteropidae

The white-eyes are small and mostly undistinguished, their plumage above being generally some dull colour like greenish-olive, but some species have a white or bright yellow throat, breast, or lower parts, and several have buff flanks. As their name suggests, many species have a white ring around each eye.

Common name	Binomial	Status
Orange River white-eye	Zosterops pallidus	
Cape white-eye	Zosterops virens	
Southern yellow white-eye	Zosterops anderssoni	

== Laughingthrushes and allies ==
Order: Passeriformes Family: Leiothrichidae

The members of this family are diverse in size and colouration, though those of genus Turdoides tend to be brown or greyish. The family is found in Africa, India, and southeast Asia.

Common name	Binomial	Status
Arrow-marked babbler	Turdoides jardineii	
Southern pied-babbler	Turdoides bicolor	

== Spotted creepers ==
Order: Passeriformes Family: Salpornithidae

Spotted creepers are small birds that climb on trees, gleaning and probing bark to fetch insects. They were until recently placed with the treecreepers in the family Certhiidae.

Common name	Binomial	Status
African spotted creeper	Salpornis salvadori	Vagrant

== Oxpeckers ==
Order: Passeriformes Family: Buphagidae

As both the English and scientific names of these birds imply, they feed on ectoparasites, primarily ticks, found on large mammals.

Common name	Binomial	Status
Red-billed oxpecker	Buphagus erythrorynchus	
Yellow-billed oxpecker	Buphagus africanus	

== Starlings ==
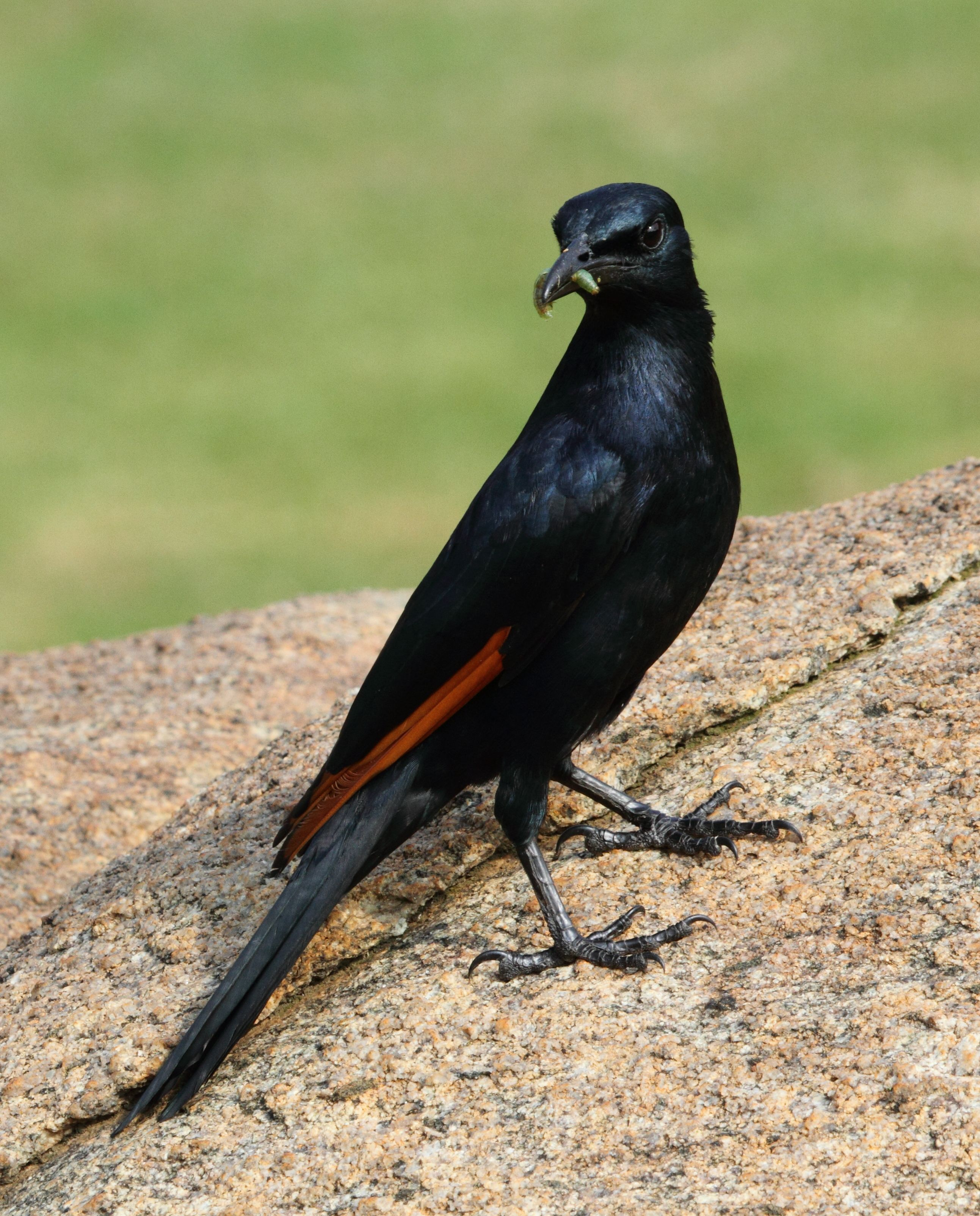
Red-winged starling

Order: Passeriformes Family: Sturnidae

Starlings are small to medium-sized passerine birds. Their flight is strong and direct and they are very gregarious. Their preferred habitat is fairly open country. They eat insects and fruit. Plumage is typically dark with a metallic sheen.

Common name	Binomial	Status
European starling	Sturnus vulgaris	Introduced
Wattled starling	Creatophora cinerea	
Rosy starling	Pastor roseus	Vagrant
Common myna	Acridotheres tristis	Introduced
Violet-backed starling	Cinnyricinclus leucogaster	
Pale-winged starling	Onychognathus nabouroup	
Red-winged starling	Onychognathus morio	
Black-bellied starling	Notopholia corusca	
Burchell's starling	Lamprotornis australis	
Meves's starling	Lamprotornis mevesii	
African pied starling	Lamprotornis bicolor	SLE endemic (see note) (Note: Clements lists this species as inhabiting several other countries as well)
Lesser blue-eared starling	Lamprotornis chloropterus	Vagrant
Greater blue-eared starling	Lamprotornis chalybaeus	
Cape starling	Lamprotornis nitens	

== Thrushes and allies ==
Order: Passeriformes Family: Turdidae

The thrushes are a group of passerine birds that occur mainly in the Old World. They are plump, soft plumaged, small to medium-sized insectivores or sometimes omnivores, often feeding on the ground. Many have attractive songs.

Common name	Binomial	Status
Spotted ground-thrush	Geokichla guttata	Endangered
Orange ground-thrush	Geokichla gurneyi	
Groundscraper thrush	Turdus litsitsirupa	
Kurrichane thrush	Turdus libonyana	
Olive thrush	Turdus olivaceus	
Karoo thrush	Turdus smithi	

== Old World flycatchers ==
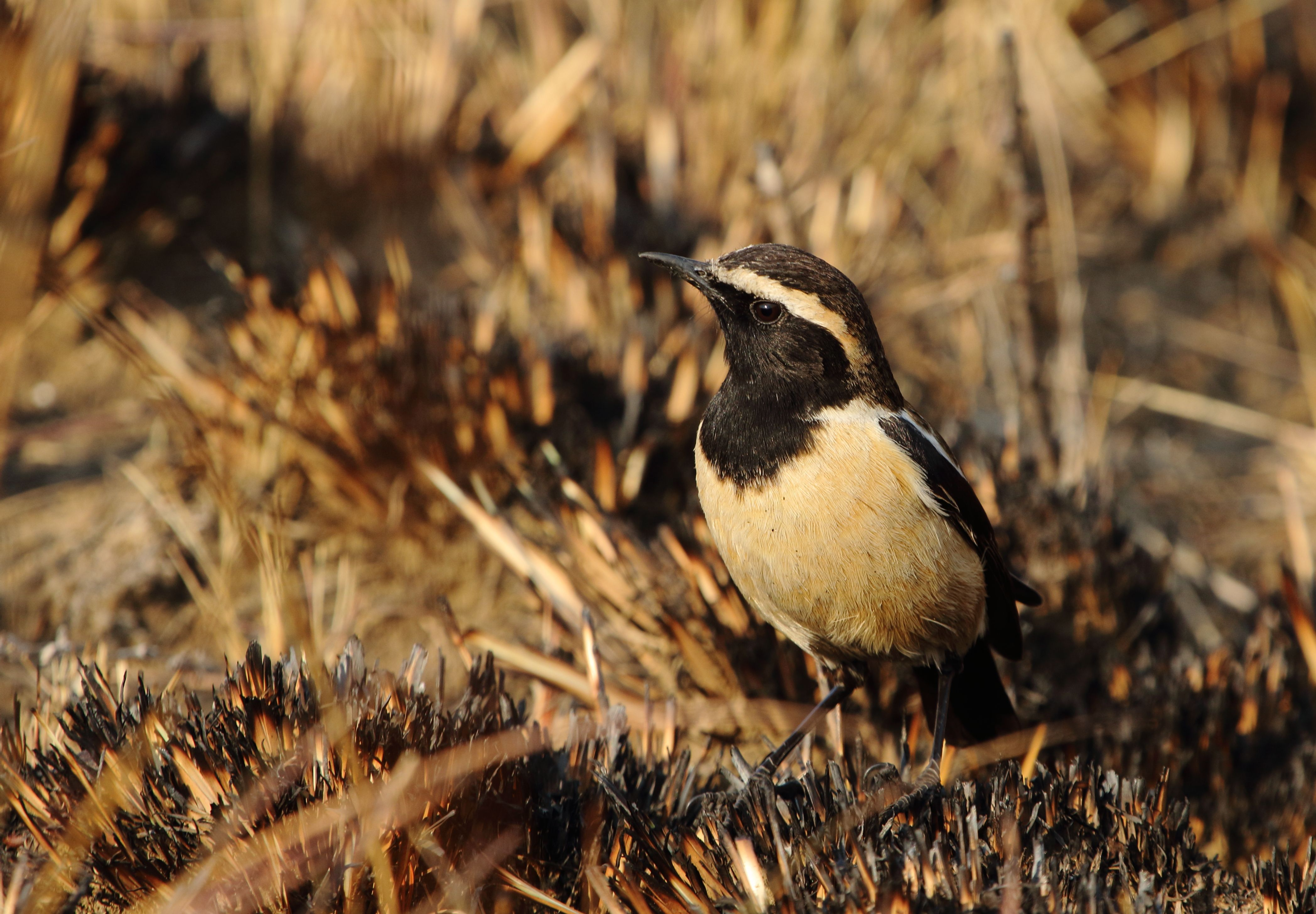
Buff-streaked bushchat

Order: Passeriformes Family: Muscicapidae

Old World flycatchers are a large group of small passerine birds native to the Old World. They are mainly small arboreal insectivores. The appearance of these birds is highly varied, but they mostly have weak songs and harsh calls.

Common name	Binomial	Status
African dusky flycatcher	Muscicapa adusta	
Spotted flycatcher	Muscicapa striata	
Mariqua flycatcher	Bradornis mariquensis	
Pale flycatcher	Agricola pallidus	
Chat flycatcher	Agricola infuscatus	
Gray tit-flycatcher	Fraseria plumbea	
Ashy flycatcher	Fraseria caerulescens	
Fiscal flycatcher	Melaenornis silens	
Southern black-flycatcher	Melaenornis pammelaina	
Karoo scrub-robin	Cercotrichas coryphoeus	
Brown scrub-robin	Cercotrichas signata	
Bearded scrub-robin	Cercotrichas quadrivirgata	
Rufous-tailed scrub-robin	Cercotrichas galactotes	Vagrant
Kalahari scrub-robin	Cercotrichas paena	
Red-backed scrub-robin	Cercotrichas leucophrys	
Cape robin-chat	Cossypha caffra	
White-throated robin-chat	Cossypha humeralis	
White-browed robin-chat	Cossypha heuglini	
Red-capped robin-chat	Cossypha natalensis	
Chorister robin-chat	Cossypha dichroa	
Collared palm-thrush	Cichladusa arquata	Vagrant
White-starred robin	Pogonocichla stellata	
White-throated robin	Irania gutturalis	Vagrant
Thrush nightingale	Luscinia luscinia	Vagrant
European pied flycatcher	Ficedula hypoleuca	Vagrant
Collared flycatcher	Ficedula albicollis	Vagrant
Common redstart	Phoenicurus phoenicurus	Vagrant
Short-toed rock-thrush	Monticola brevipes	
Sentinel rock-thrush	Monticola explorator	Near threatened
Cape rock-thrush	Monticola rupestris	SLE endemic (see note) (Note: Clements lists this species as also inhabiting Botswana and Mozambique)
Whinchat	Saxicola rubetra	Vagrant
African stonechat	Saxicola torquatus	
Buff-streaked chat	Campicoloides bifasciatus	
Sickle-winged chat	Emarginata sinuata	
Karoo chat	Emarginata schlegelii	
Tractrac chat	Emarginata tractrac	
Mocking cliff-chat	Thamnolaea cinnamomeiventris	
Southern anteater-chat	Myrmecocichla formicivora	
Mountain wheatear	Myrmecocichla monticola	
Arnot's chat	Myrmecocichla arnotti	
Northern wheatear	Oenanthe oenanthe	Vagrant
Capped wheatear	Oenanthe pileata	
Pied wheatear	Oenanthe pleschanka	Vagrant
Familiar chat	Oenanthe familiaris	
Boulder chat	Pinarornis plumosus	Vagrant

== Sugarbirds ==
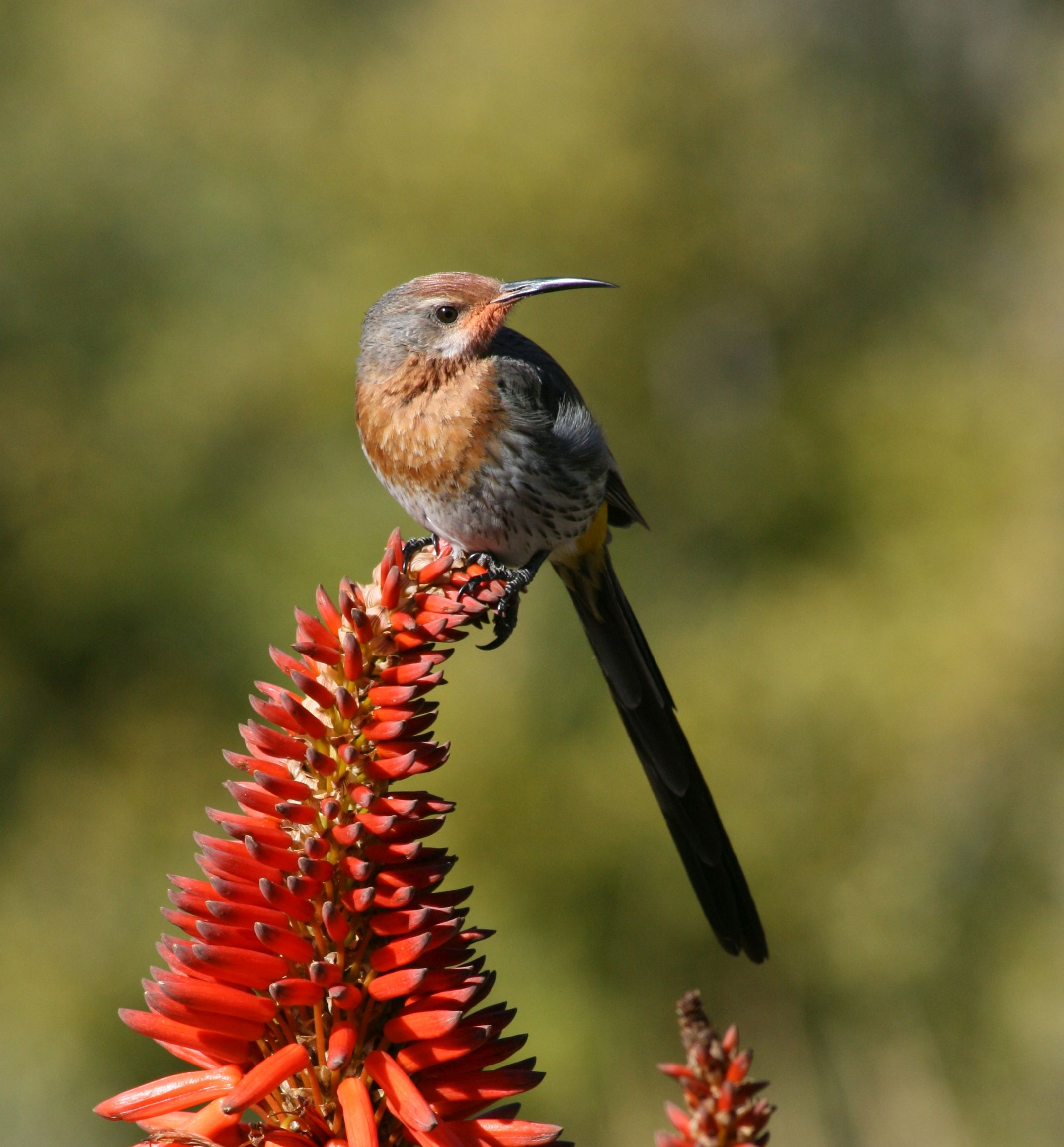
Gurney's sugarbird

Order: Passeriformes Family: Promeropidae

The two species in this family are restricted to southern Africa. They have brownish plumage, a long downcurved bill, and long tail feathers.

Common name	Binomial	Status
Gurney's sugarbird	Promerops gurneyi	Near threatened
Cape sugarbird	Promerops cafer	Endemic

== Sunbirds and spiderhunters ==
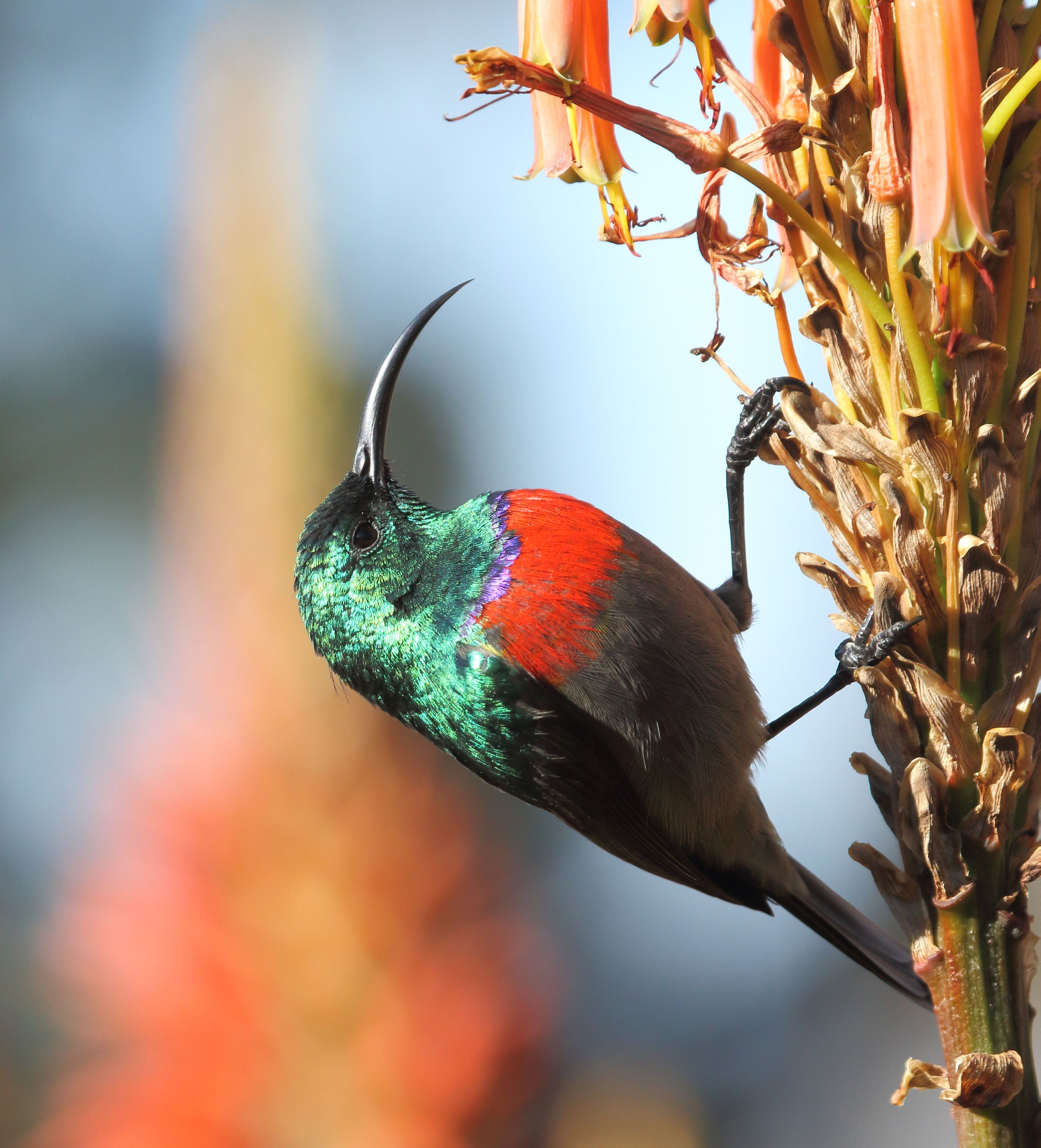
Southern double-collared sunbird

Order: Passeriformes Family: Nectariniidae

The sunbirds and spiderhunters are very small passerine birds which feed largely on nectar, although they will also take insects, especially when feeding young. Flight is fast and direct on their short wings. Most species can take nectar by hovering like a hummingbird, but usually perch to feed.

Common name	Binomial	Status
Plain-backed sunbird	Anthreptes reichenowi	Vagrant
Collared sunbird	Hedydipna collaris	
Orange-breasted sunbird	Anthobaphes violacea	Endemic
Olive sunbird	Cyanomitra olivacea	
Mouse-colored sunbird	Cyanomitra veroxii	
Amethyst sunbird	Chalcomitra amethystina	
Scarlet-chested sunbird	Chalcomitra senegalensis	
Malachite sunbird	Nectarinia famosa	
Southern double-collared sunbird	Cinnyris chalybeus	
Neergaard's sunbird	Cinnyris neergaardi	Near threatened
Greater double-collared sunbird	Cinnyris afer	SLE endemic
Mariqua sunbird	Cinnyris mariquensis	
Purple-banded sunbird	Cinnyris bifasciatus	
White-breasted sunbird	Cinnyris talatala	
Variable sunbird	Cinnyris venustus	Vagrant
Dusky sunbird	Cinnyris fuscus	

== Weavers and allies ==
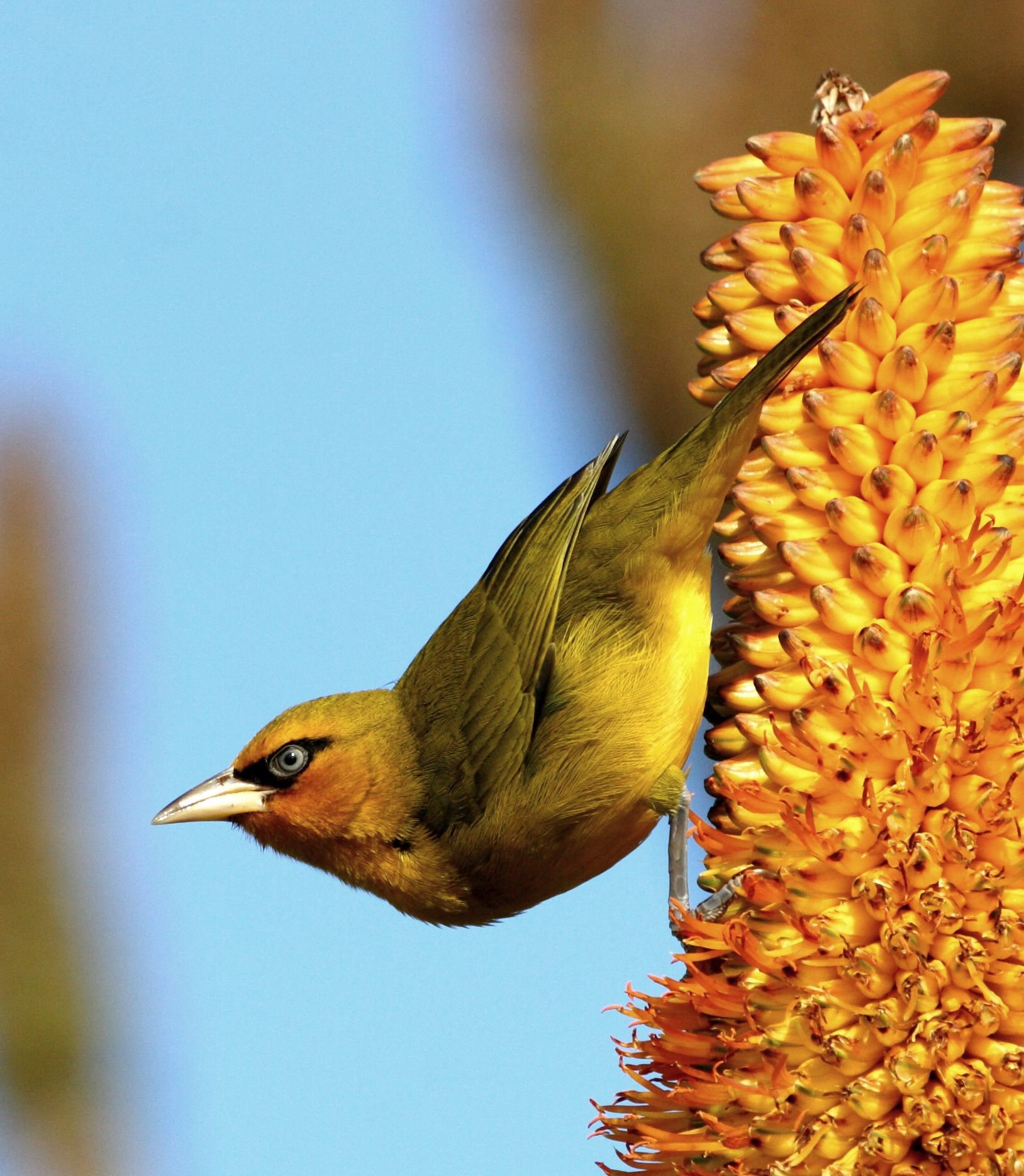
Spectacled weaver

Order: Passeriformes Family: Ploceidae

The weavers are small passerine birds related to the finches. They are seed-eating birds with rounded conical bills. The males of many species are brightly coloured, usually in red or yellow and black. Some species show variation in colour only in the breeding season.

Common name	Binomial	Status
Red-billed buffalo-weaver	Bubalornis niger	
Scaly weaver	Sporopipes squamifrons	
White-browed sparrow-weaver	Plocepasser mahali	
Sociable weaver	Philetairus socius	
Red-headed weaver	Anaplectes rubriceps	
Spectacled weaver	Ploceus ocularis	
Cape weaver	Ploceus capensis	Endemic
African golden-weaver	Ploceus subaureus	
Holub's golden-weaver	Ploceus xanthops	
Southern brown-throated weaver	Ploceus xanthopterus	
Lesser masked-weaver	Ploceus intermedius	
Southern masked-weaver	Ploceus velatus	
Village weaver	Ploceus cucullatus	
Chestnut weaver	Ploceus rubiginosus	Vagrant
Forest weaver	Ploceus bicolor	
Red-headed quelea	Quelea erythrops	
Red-billed quelea	Quelea quelea	
Southern red bishop	Euplectes orix	
Yellow-crowned bishop	Euplectes afer	
Yellow bishop	Euplectes capensis	
White-winged widowbird	Euplectes albonotatus	
Red-collared widowbird	Euplectes ardens	
Fan-tailed widowbird	Euplectes axillaris	
Long-tailed widowbird	Euplectes progne	
Grosbeak weaver	Amblyospiza albifrons	

== Waxbills and allies ==
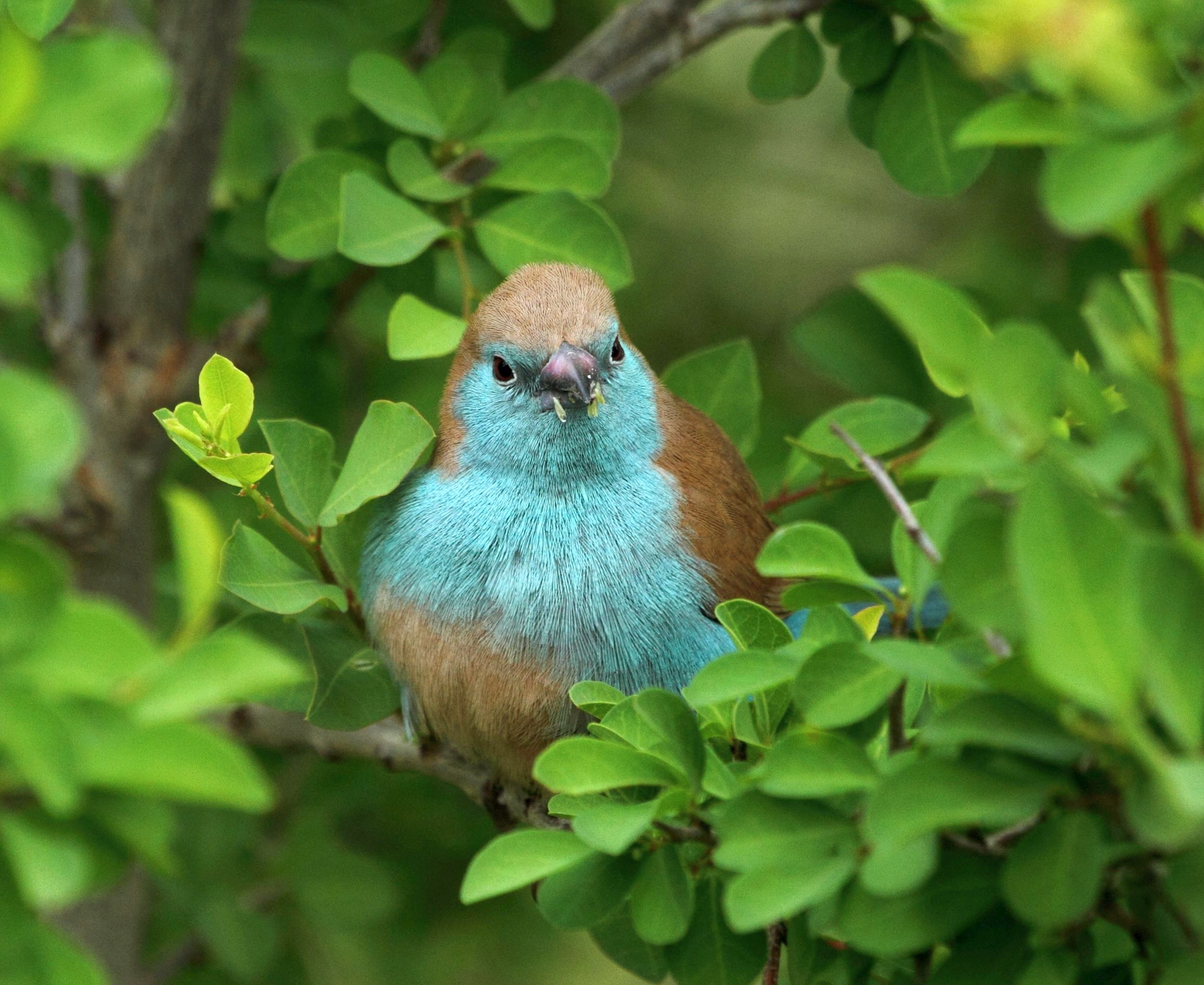
Southern cordonbleu

Order: Passeriformes Family: Estrildidae

The estrildid finches are small passerine birds of the Old World tropics and Australasia. They are gregarious and often colonial seed eaters with short thick but pointed bills. They are all similar in structure and habits, but have wide variation in plumage colours and patterns.

Common name	Binomial	Status
Bronze mannikin	Spermestes cucullata	
Magpie mannikin	Spermestes fringilloides	
Black-and-white mannikin	Spermestes bicolor	See note (Note: BLSA considers the red-backed subspecies, S. b. nigriceps, to be a full species)
Swee waxbill	Coccopygia melanotis	
Green-backed twinspot	Mandingoa nitidula	
Black-faced waxbill	Brunhilda erythronotos	
Black-tailed waxbill	Glaucestrilda perreini	
Common waxbill	Estrilda astrild	
Quailfinch	Ortygospiza atricollis	
Cut-throat	Amadina fasciata	
Red-headed finch	Amadina erythrocephala	
Zebra waxbill	Amandava subflava	
Violet-eared waxbill	Uraeginthus granatina	
Southern cordonbleu	Uraeginthus angolensis	
Green-winged pytilia	Pytilia melba	
Orange-winged pytilia	Pytilia afra	
Peters's twinspot	Hypargos niveoguttatus	
Pink-throated twinspot	Hypargos margaritatus	
Red-billed firefinch	Lagonosticta senegala	
African firefinch	Lagonosticta rubricata	
Jameson's firefinch	Lagonosticta rhodopareia	

== Indigobirds ==
Order: Passeriformes Family: Viduidae

The indigobirds are finch-like species which usually have black or indigo predominating in their plumage. All are brood parasites which lay their eggs in the nests of estrildid finches.

Common name	Binomial	Status
Pin-tailed whydah	Vidua macroura	
Broad-tailed paradise-whydah	Vidua obtusa	Vagrant
Eastern paradise-whydah	Vidua paradisaea	
Shaft-tailed whydah	Vidua regia	
Village indigobird	Vidua chalybeata	
Wilson's indigobird	Vidua wilsoni	
Variable indigobird	Vidua funerea	
Purple indigobird	Vidua purpurascens	
Parasitic weaver	Anomalospiza imberbis	

== Old World sparrows ==
Order: Passeriformes Family: Passeridae

Sparrows are small passerine birds. In general, sparrows tend to be small, plump, brown, or grey birds with short tails and short powerful beaks. Sparrows are seed eaters, but they also consume small insects.

Common name	Binomial	Status
House sparrow	Passer domesticus	Introduced
Great rufous sparrow	Passer motitensis	
Cape sparrow	Passer melanurus	
Southern gray-headed sparrow	Passer diffusus	
Yellow-throated bush sparrow	Gymnoris superciliaris	

== Wagtails and pipits ==
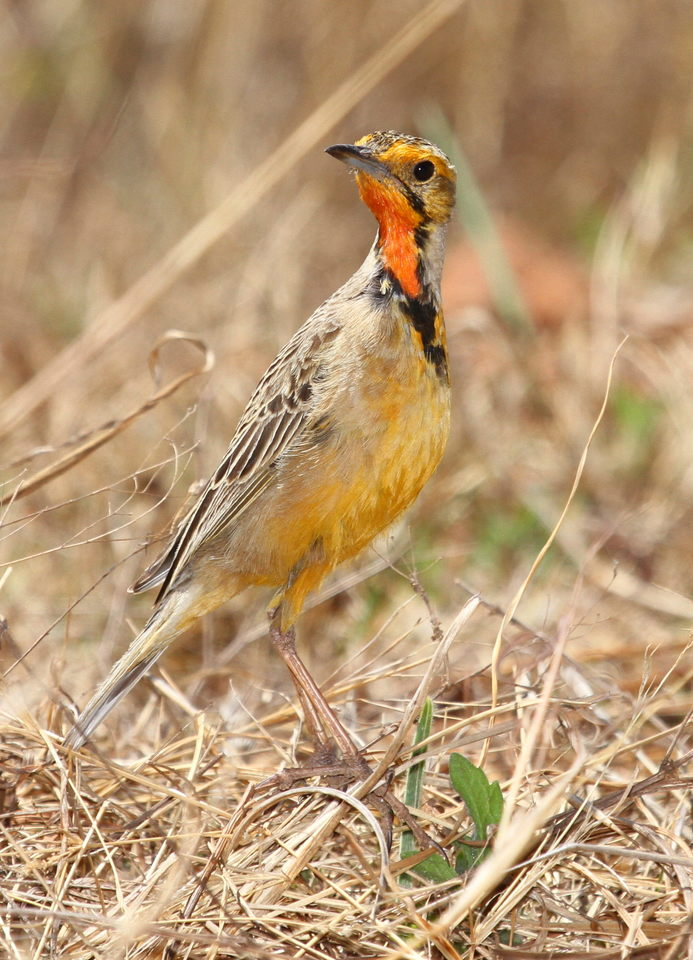
Orange-throated longclaw

Order: Passeriformes Family: Motacillidae

Motacillidae is a family of small passerine birds with medium to long tails. They are slender ground-feeding insectivores of open country.

Common name	Binomial	Status
Cape wagtail	Motacilla capensis	
Mountain wagtail	Motacilla clara	
Gray wagtail	Motacilla cinerea	Vagrant
Western yellow wagtail	Motacilla flava	
Citrine wagtail	Motacilla citreola	Vagrant
African pied wagtail	Motacilla aguimp	
White wagtail	Motacilla alba	Vagrant
African pipit	Anthus cinnamomeus	
Mountain pipit	Anthus hoeschi	Near threatened
Nicholson's pipit	Anthus nicholsoni	
Plain-backed pipit	Anthus leucophrys	
Buffy pipit	Anthus vaalensis	
Striped pipit	Anthus lineiventris	
Yellow-tufted pipit	Anthus crenatus	SLE endemic
Tree pipit	Anthus trivialis	Vagrant
Red-throated pipit	Anthus cervinus	Vagrant
Short-tailed pipit	Anthus brachyurus	
Bush pipit	Anthus caffer	
Golden pipit	Tmetothylacus tenellus	Vagrant
Yellow-breasted pipit	Hemimacronyx chloris	Endemic (see note), (Note: Clements lists this species as also inhabiting Lesotho, making it SLE endemic) vulnerable
Orange-throated longclaw	Macronyx capensis	
Yellow-throated longclaw	Macronyx croceus	
Rosy-throated longclaw	Macronyx ameliae	

== Finches, euphonias, and allies ==
Order: Passeriformes Family: Fringillidae

Finches are seed-eating passerine birds that are small to moderately large and have a strong beak, usually conical and in some species very large. All have twelve tail feathers and nine primaries. These birds have a bouncing flight with alternating bouts of flapping and gliding on closed wings, and most sing well.

Common name	Binomial	Status
Common chaffinch	Fringilla coelebs	Introduced
Yellow-fronted canary	Crithagra mozambica	
Forest canary	Crithagra scotops	SLS endemic
Black-throated canary	Crithagra atrogularis	
Lemon-breasted seedeater	Crithagra citrinipectus	
Brimstone canary	Crithagra sulphurata	
Yellow canary	Crithagra flaviventris	
White-throated canary	Crithagra albogularis	
Protea canary	Crithagra leucoptera	Endemic; near threatened
Black-eared seedeater	Crithagra mennelli	
Streaky-headed seedeater	Crithagra gularis	
Cape siskin	Crithagra totta	Endemic
Drakensberg siskin	Crithagra symonsi	SLS endemic
Cape canary	Serinus canicollis	
Black-headed canary	Serinus alario	

== Old World buntings ==
Order: Passeriformes Family: Emberizidae

The emberizids are a large family of passerine birds. They are seed-eating birds with distinctively shaped bills. In Europe, most species are called buntings. Many emberizid species have distinctive head patterns.

Common name	Binomial	Status
Ortolan bunting	Emberiza hortulana	Vagrant
Golden-breasted bunting	Emberiza flaviventris	
Cape bunting	Emberiza capensis	
Lark-like bunting	Emberiza impetuani	
Cinnamon-breasted bunting	Emberiza tahapisi	

== See also ==
- List of mammals of South Africa

== See also ==
- List of birds
- Lists of birds by region
- List of birds of the Prince Edward Islands
- List of birds of Gauteng
