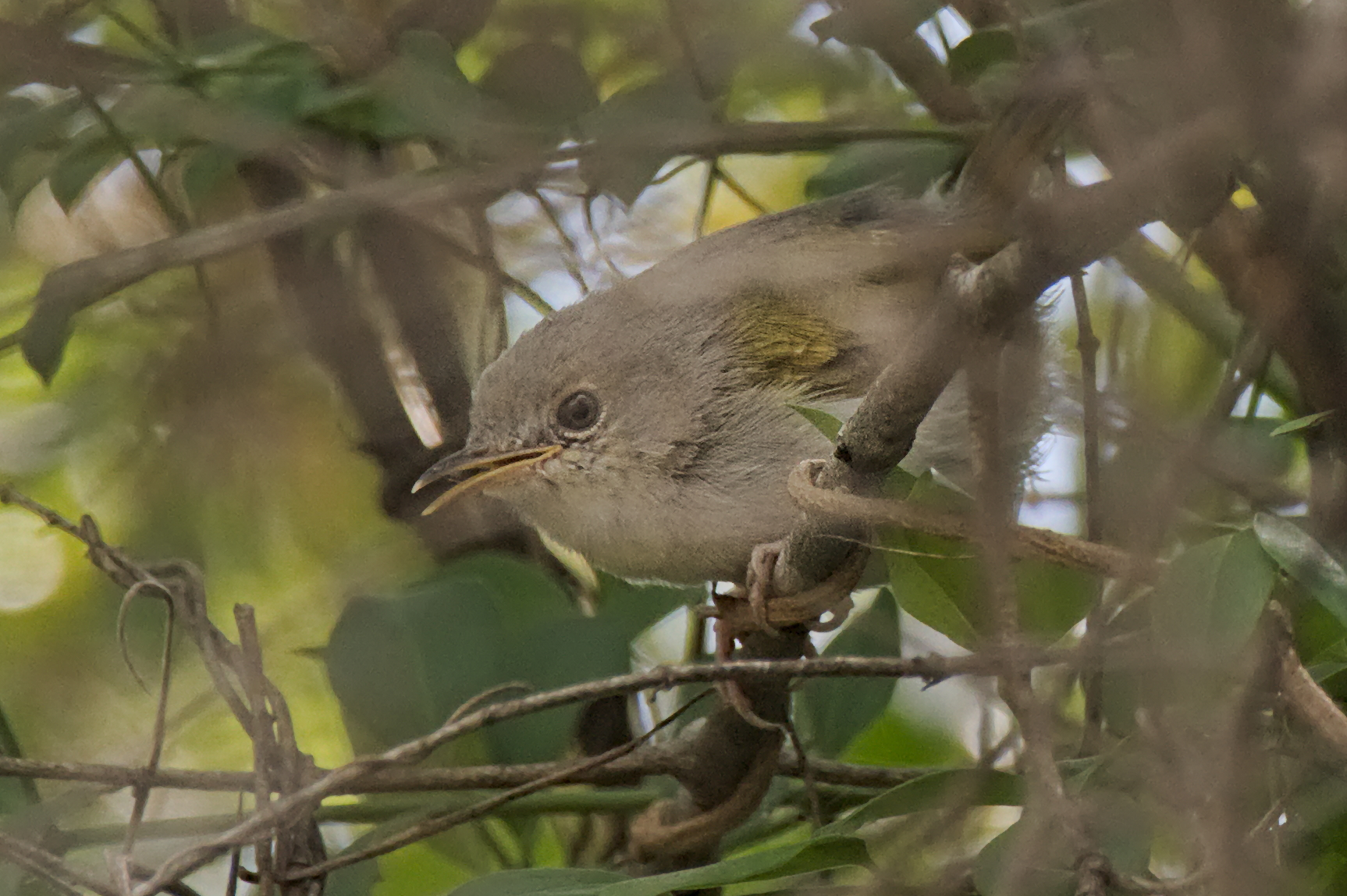

Conservation status
- Least Concern (IUCN 3.1)

Scientific classification
- Kingdom: Animalia
- Phylum: Chordata
- Class: Aves
- Order: Passeriformes
- Family: Cisticolidae
- Genus: Camaroptera
- Species: C. harterti

Binomial name
- Camaroptera harterti Zedlitz, 1911

Synonyms
- Camaroptera griseoviridis harterti

= Hartert's camaroptera =

Species of bird

Hartert's camaroptera (Camaroptera harterti) is a small bird in the family Cisticolidae. It is endemic to Angola.

Hartert's camaroptera was described by the German ornithologist Otto Eduard Graf von Zedlitz und Trützschler in 1911 under the trinomial name Camaroptera griseoviridis harterti. The type location in the town of Canhoca in northern Angola. The specific epithet harterti is in honour of the German ornithologist Ernst Hartert who was the curator of the Rothschild Museum in Tring, England. It was at one time treated as a subspecies of the green-backed camaroptera but is now treated as a separate species.
