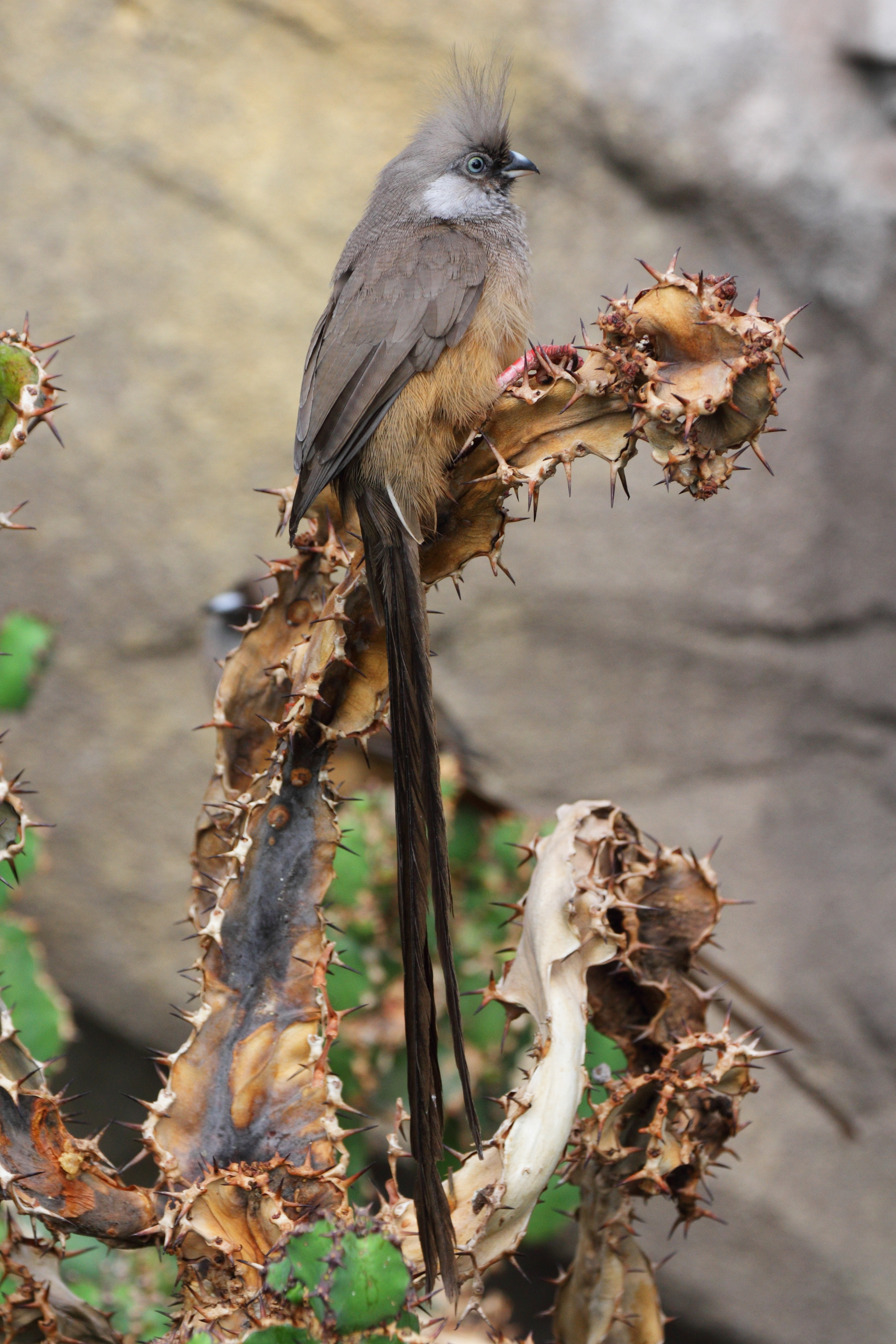

Conservation status
- Least Concern (IUCN 3.1)

Scientific classification
- Kingdom: Animalia
- Phylum: Chordata
- Class: Aves
- Order: Coliiformes
- Family: Coliidae
- Genus: Colius
- Species: C. striatus

Binomial name
- Colius striatus Gmelin, JF, 1789

= Speckled mousebird =

Species of bird

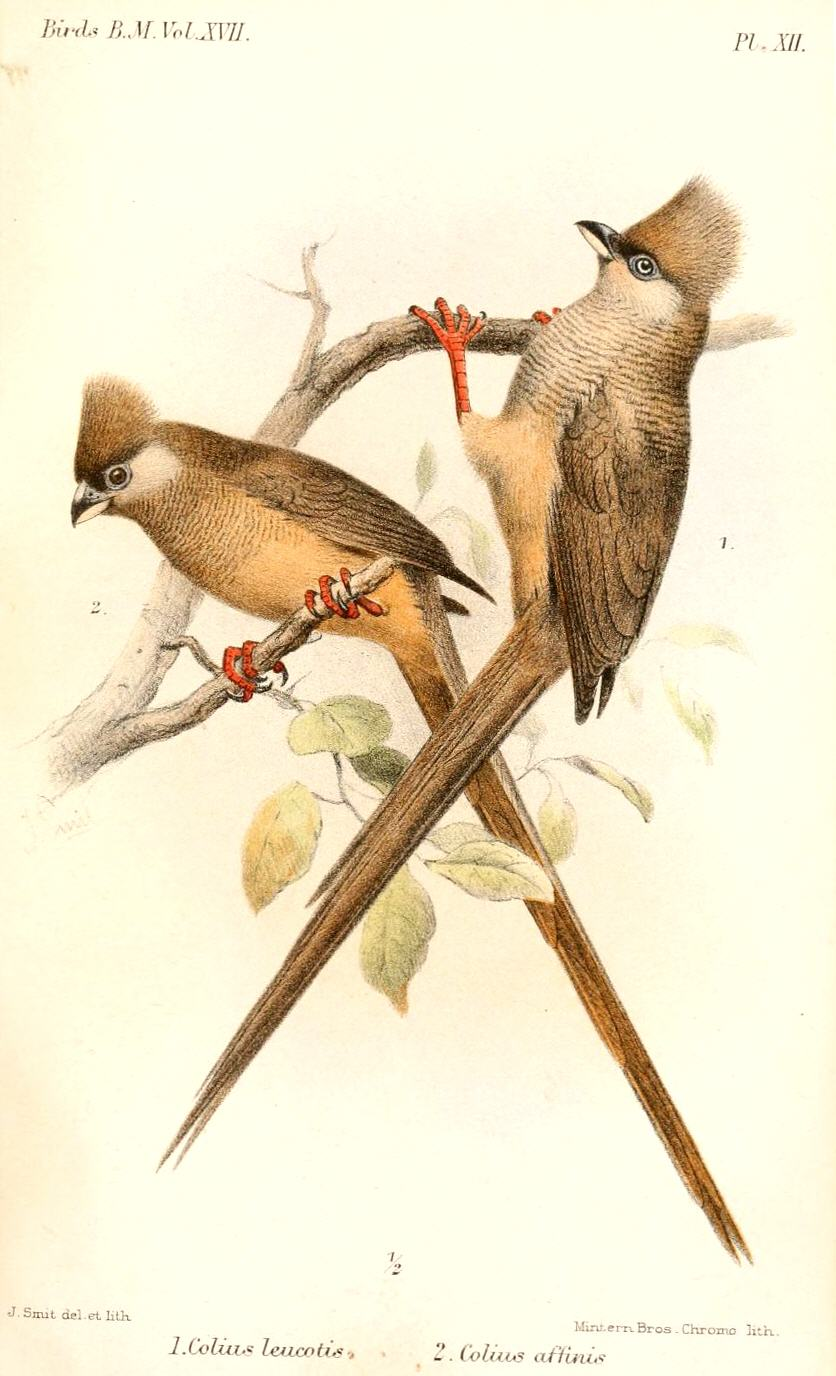
Subspecies C. s. leucotis (right), and C. s. affinis (left); illustration by Joseph Smit, 1892

The speckled mousebird (Colius striatus) is the largest species of mousebird, as well as one of the most common. It is found throughout most of Central, Eastern and Southern Africa.

== Taxonomy ==
The speckled mousebird was formally described in 1789 by the German naturalist Johann Friedrich Gmelin in his revised and expanded edition of Carl Linnaeus's Systema Naturae. He placed it with the mousebirds in the genus Colius and coined the binomial name Colius striatus. Gmelin based his description on the "Coliou rayé" that had been described in 1778 by the French polymath Comte de Buffon from a specimen that had been collected near the Cape of Good Hope in South Africa.

Seventeen subspecies are recognised:

- C. s. nigricollis Vieillot, 1817 – Ghana and Nigeria to southwest Central African Republic and south to west Angola and southwest DR Congo
- C. s. leucophthalmus Chapin, 1921 – north DR Congo, southeast Central African Republic and southwest Sudan
- C. s. leucotis Rüppell, 1839 – east Sudan, Eritrea and west, central Ethiopia
- C. s. hilgerti Zedlitz, 1910 – southwest Djibouti, northeast Ethiopia and northwest Somalia
- C. s. jebelensis Mearns, 1915 – south Sudan, northeast DR Congo and north Uganda
- C. s. mombassicus Van Someren, 1919 – south Somalia to northeast Tanzania
- C. s. kikuyensis Van Someren, 1919 – central Kenya and north Tanzania
- C. s. cinerascens Neumann, 1900 – west, central Tanzania
- C. s. affinis Shelley, 1885 – east Tanzania to northeast Zimbabwe and north Mozambique
- C. s. berlepschi Hartert, EJO, 1899 – southwest Tanzania to northeast Zambia and Malawi
- C. s. kiwuensis Reichenow, 1908 – east DR Congo, central, south Uganda, Rwanda, Burundi and northwest Tanzania
- C. s. congicus Reichenow, 1923 – east Angola to south, southeast DR Congo and west Zambia
- C. s. simulans Clancey, 1979 – central Mozambique and southeast Malawi
- C. s. integralis Clancey, 1957 – northeast South Africa, southeast Zimbabwe and south Mozambique
- C. s. rhodesiae Grant, CHB & Mackworth-Praed, 1938 – east Zimbabwe and west Mozambique
- C. s. minor Cabanis, 1876 – east South Africa and Eswatini (formerly Swaziland)
- C. s. striatus Gmelin, JF, 1789 – south South Africa

== Description ==
The speckled mousebird is about 35 cm (14 in) long, with the tail comprising approximately half the length, and weighs about 57 g (2.0 oz). It is well-named, because it is dull-mousy brown in overall color on the back and on the head (including a prominent crest). The bill is black on the upper part and is a pinkish color on the lower part. The subspecies mainly differ in the contrast on the head, the throat colour, the amount of barring and the iris colour.

The rare white-headed mousebird can be confused with this species, but the differently colored mandibles and the lack of a bare grey orbital patch render the speckled species distinctive. The speckled mousebird is not known for its voice, as songbirds are, although it is a noisy creature. They make a warbling tsu-tsu call while in flight, and are known for their tisk-tisk alarm call while in flight.

== Distribution and habitat ==
It is distributed from Cameroon east to Eritrea and Ethiopia, south through eastern Africa to southern South Africa and it is overspread whole part of Tanzania . Most habitats are suitable for this species, except the rainforests and more arid areas. This mousebird prefers open bushveld habitats. It is widespread in savanna and open woodlands, as well as areas with tangled thickets. It is a common "backyard bird," often seen in urban areas that contain gardens and orchards.

== Behaviour and ecology ==
These are conspicuously social birds, feeding together and engaging in mutual preening. They also accompany each other when they go to ground to dust bathe (also to occasionally to swallow pebbles to assist in grinding up vegetation as they digest it). Upon nightfall, they roost in very tight groups of 20 or so birds and on cold nights they can become torpid. Being in a torpid state could make them easy prey, but the large groups are apparently effective enough to deter most nocturnal predators.

=== Breeding ===
The speckled mousebird may breed at any time of the year. The nest is a large (for the bird) and untidy cup made of vegetable and animal material (sometimes including cloth and paper) and is constructed by both the male and female. Clutch size ranges from one to seven eggs (apparently based on latitude), but usually averages 3–4. Nestlings are fed by both parents and also by helpers, which usually are juveniles from previous clutches. The incubation period is fourteen days and the offspring will leave the nest for the first time at about seventeen or eighteen days. After a little over a month, the nestlings will begin foraging for themselves.

=== Food and feeding ===
The speckled mousebird is a frugivore which subsists on fruits, berries, leaves, seeds and nectar, and is fairly strict in its choice of food from area to area.

== Gallery ==
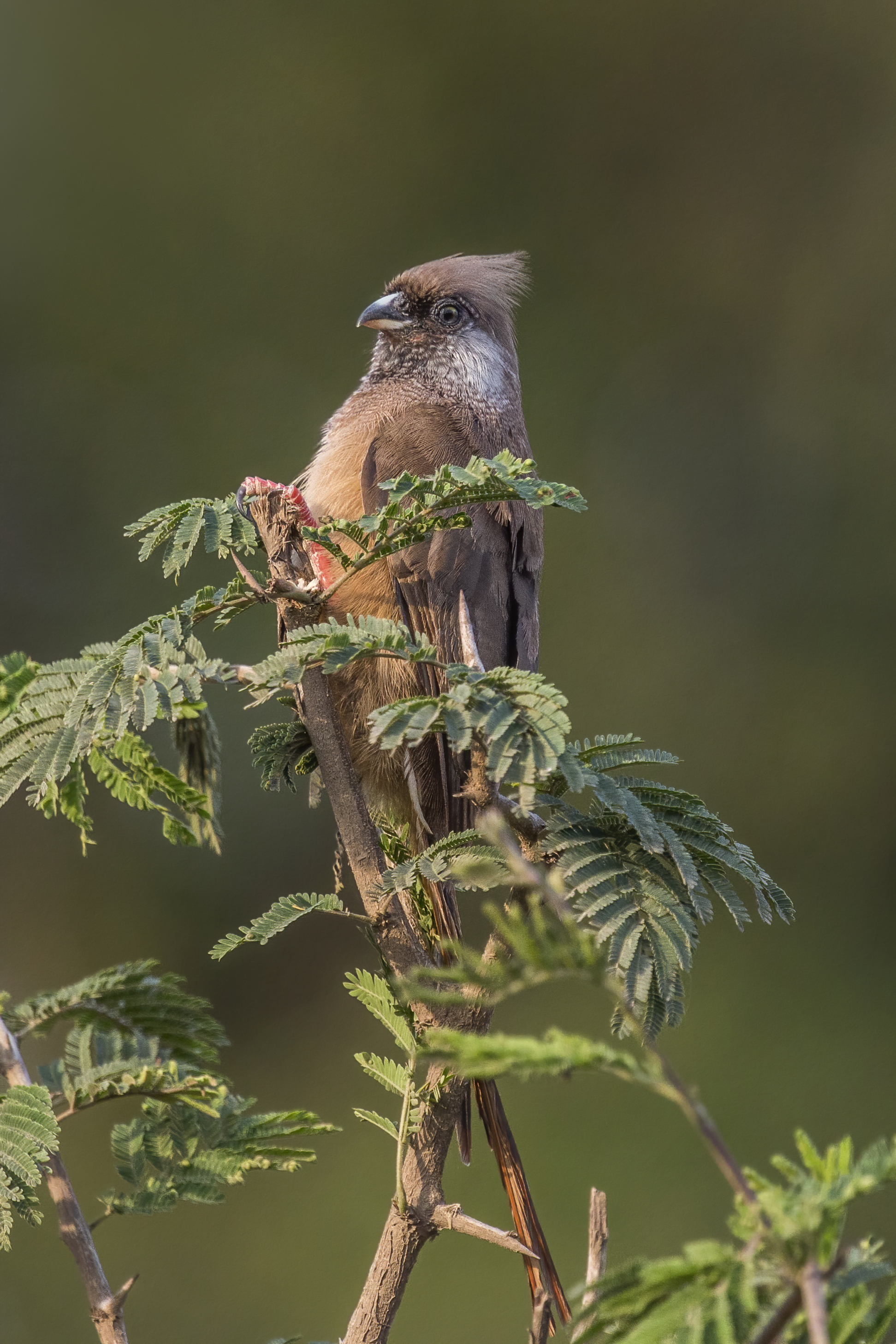
C. s. kiwuensis, Uganda

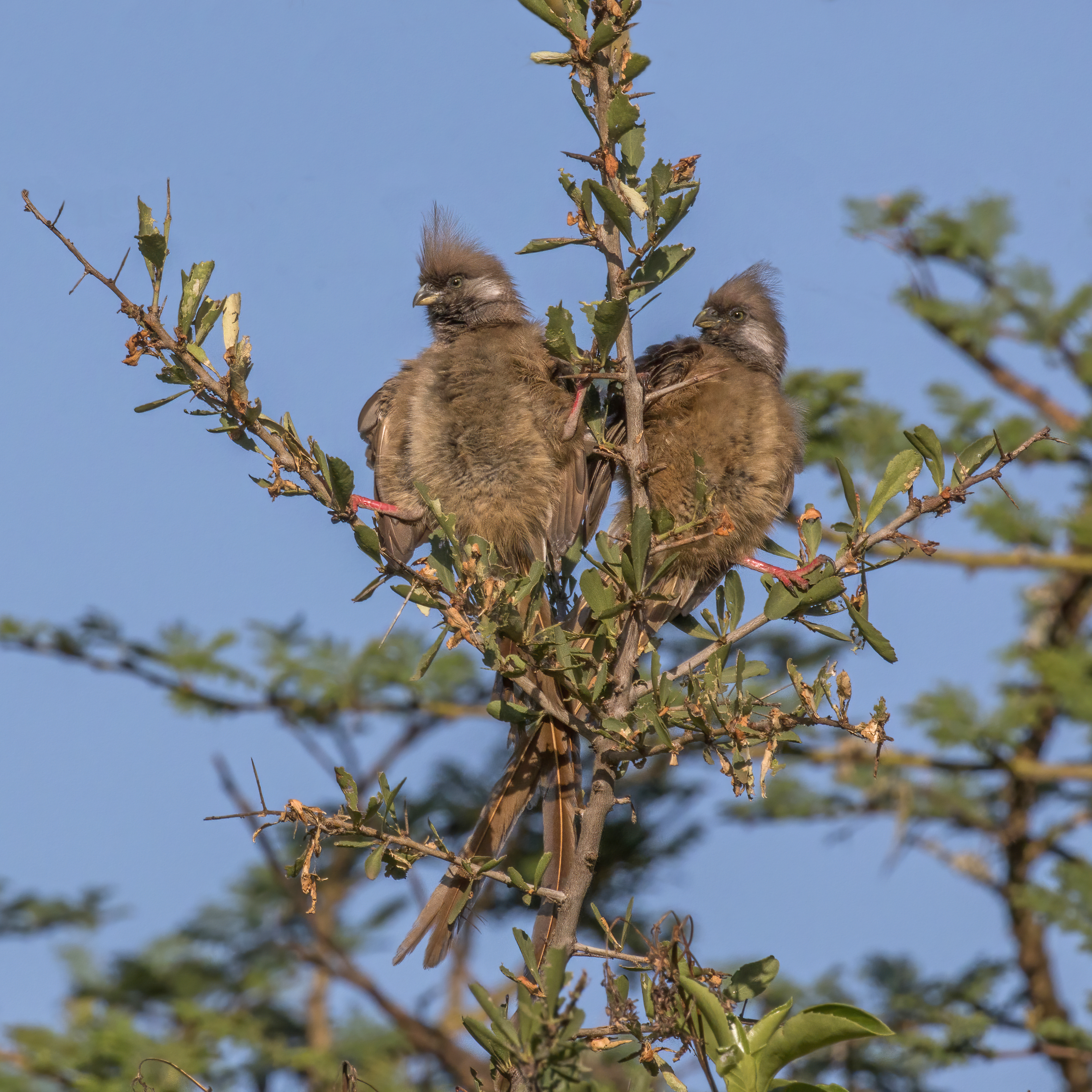
C. s. kikuyensis, Kenya
