= Kleptothermy =

Form of thermoregulation in which an animal shares in the heat production of another

In biology, kleptothermy is any form of thermoregulation by which an animal shares in the metabolic thermogenesis of another animal. It may or may not be reciprocal, and occurs in both endotherms and ectotherms. One of its forms is huddling. However, kleptothermy can happen between different species that share the same habitat, and can also happen in pre-hatching life where embryos are able to detect thermal changes in the environment.

This process requires two major conditions: the thermal heterogeneity created by the presence of a warm organism in a cool environment in addition to the use of that heterogeneity by another animal to maintain body temperatures at higher (and more stable) levels than would be possible elsewhere in the local area. The purpose of this behaviour is to enable these groups to increase its thermal inertia, retard heat loss and/or reduce the per capita metabolic expenditure needed to maintain stable body temperatures.

Kleptothermy is seen in cases where ectotherms regulate their own temperatures and exploit the high and constant body temperatures exhibited by endothermic species. In this case, the endotherms involved are not only mammals and birds; they can be termites that maintain high and constant temperatures within their mounds where they provide thermal regimes that are exploited by a wide array of lizards, snakes and crocodilians. However, many cases of kleptothermy involve ectotherms sheltering inside the burrows used by endotherms to help maintain a high constant body temperature.

== Huddling ==
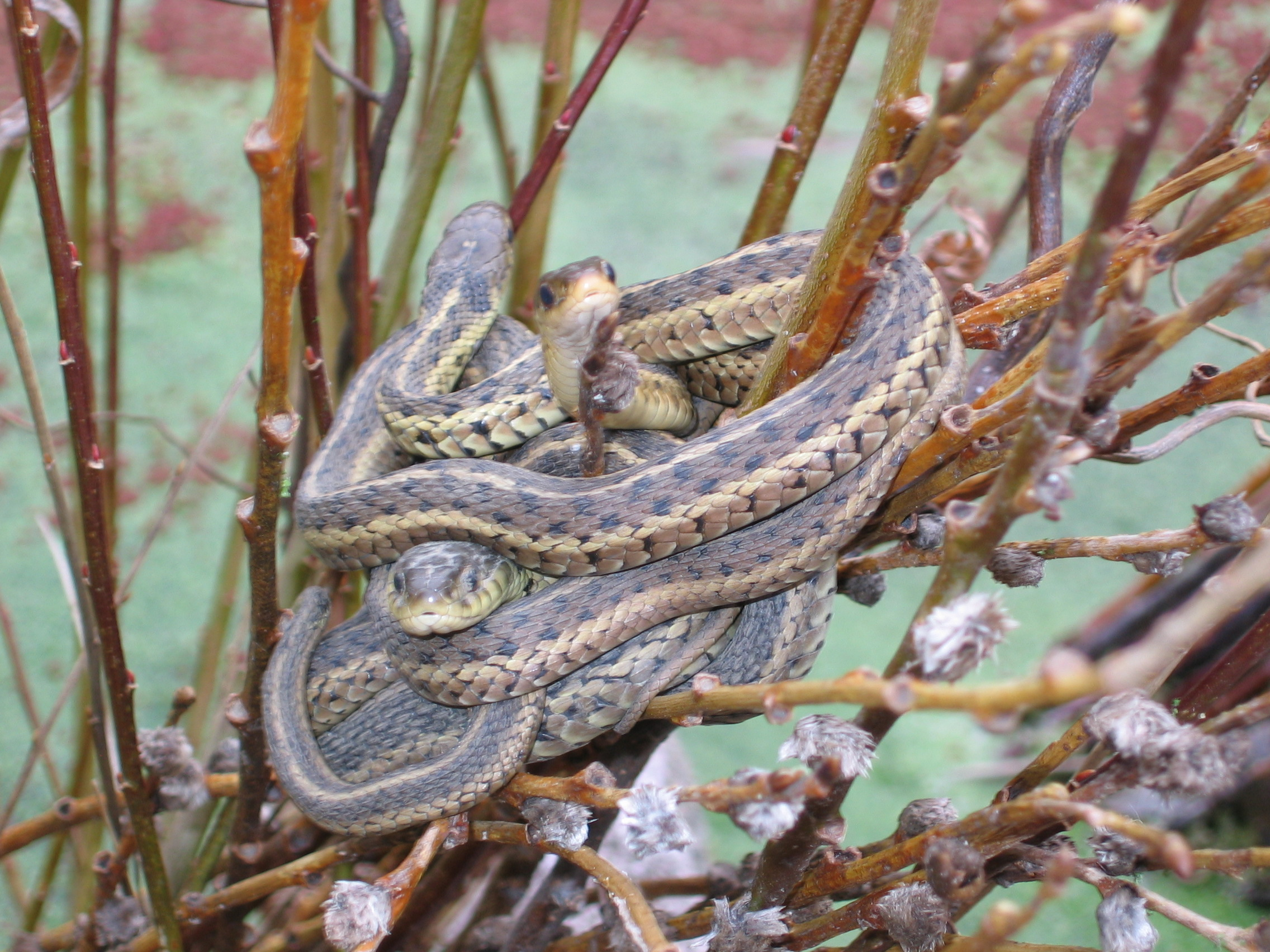
Male Canadian garter snakes huddle around a female after hibernation when mating.

Huddling confers higher and more constant body temperatures than solitary resting. Some species of ectotherms including lizards and snakes, such as boa constrictors and tiger snakes, increase their effective mass by clustering tightly together. It is also widespread amongst gregarious endotherms such as bats and birds (such as the mousebird and emperor penguin) where it allows the sharing of body heat, particularly among juveniles.

Huddling in emperor penguins.

In white-backed mousebirds (Colius colius), individuals maintain rest-phase body temperature above 32 °C despite air temperatures as low as -3.4 °C. This rest-phase body temperature was synchronized among individuals that cluster. Sometimes, kleptothermy is not reciprocal and might be accurately described as heat-stealing. For example, some male Canadian red sided garter snakes engage in female mimicry in which they produce fake pheromones after emerging from hibernation. This causes rival males to cover them in a mistaken attempt to mate, and so transfer heat to them. In turn, those males that mimic females become rapidly revitalized after hibernation (which depends upon raising their body temperature), giving them an advantage in their own attempts to mate.

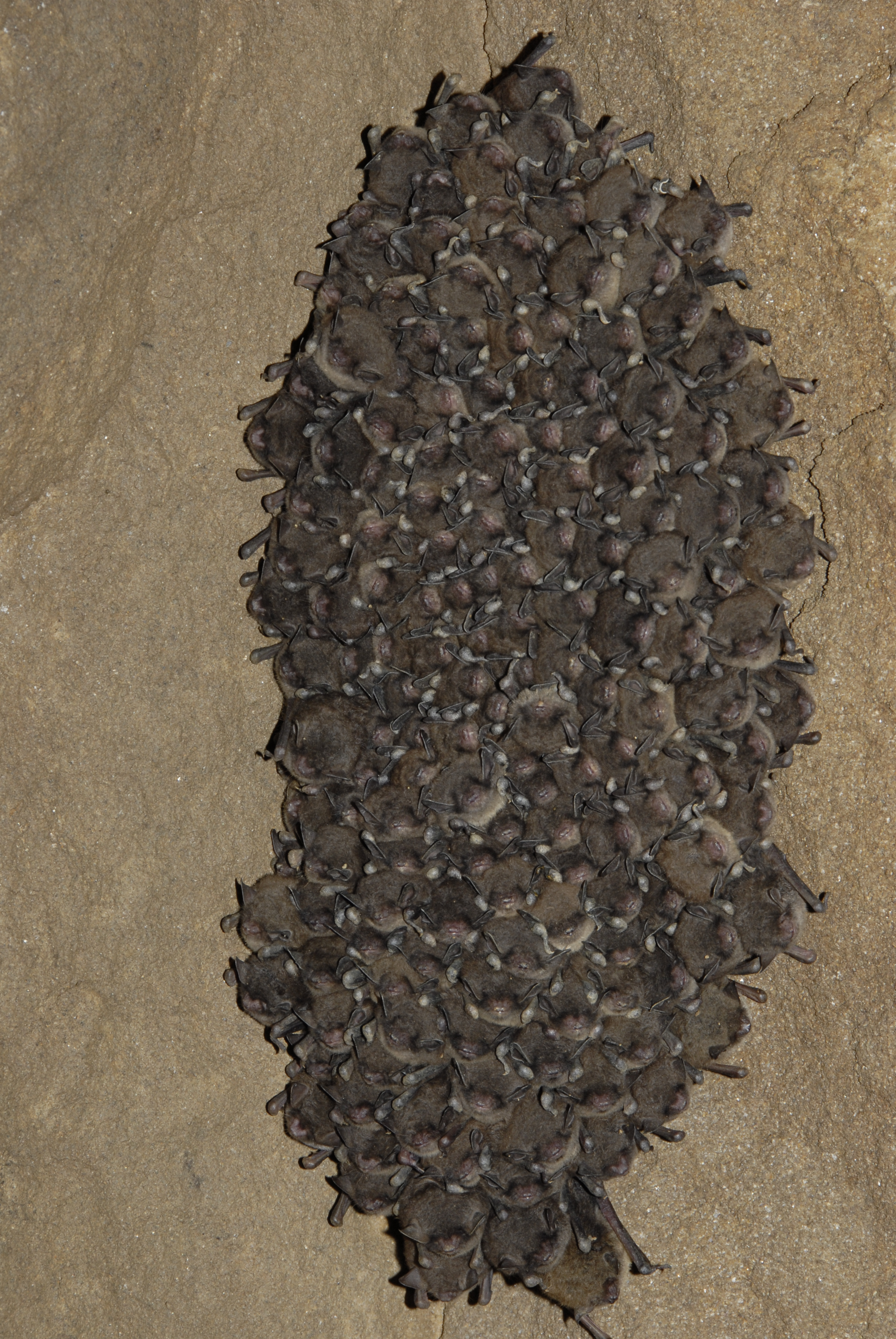
Bats cluster together to maintain high and constant body temperatures.

On the other hand, huddling allows emperor penguins (Aptenodytes forsteri) to save energy, maintain a high body temperature and sustain their breeding fast during the Antarctic winter. This huddling behaviour raises the ambient temperature that these penguins are exposed to above 0 °C (at average external temperatures of -17 °C). As a consequence of tight huddles, ambient temperatures can be above 20 °C and can increase up to 37.5 °C, close to birds' body temperature. Therefore, this complex social behaviour is what enables all breeders to get an equal and normal access to an environment which allows them to save energy and successfully incubate their eggs during the Antarctic winter.

== Habitat sharing ==
Many ectotherms exploit the heat produced by endotherms by sharing their nests and burrows. For example, mammal burrows are used by geckos and seabird burrows by Australian tiger snakes and New Zealand tuatara. Termites create high and regulated temperatures in their mounds, and this is exploited by some species of lizards, snakes and crocodiles.

Research has shown such kleptothermy can be advantageous in cases such as the blue-lipped sea krait (Laticauda laticaudata), where these reptiles occupy a burrow of a pair of wedge-tailed shearwater incubating their chick. This in turn, raises its body temperature to 37.5 °C (99.5 °F), compared to 31.7 °C (89.1 °F) when present in other habitats. Its body temperature is also observed to be more stable. On the other hand, burrows without birds did not provide this heat, being only 28 °C (82 °F).

Another example would be the case of the fairy prion (Pachyptila turtur) that forms a close association with a medium-sized reptile, the tuatara (Sphenodon punctatus). These reptiles share the burrows made by the birds, and often stay when the birds are present which helps maintain a higher body temperature. Research has shown that fairy prions enable tuatara to maintain a higher body temperature through the night for several months of the year, October to January (austral spring to summer). During the night, tuatara sharing a burrow with a bird had the most thermal benefits and helped maintain their body temperature up to 15 hours the next day.

== Pre-hatching life ==
Research done on embryos of Chinese softshell turtles (Pelodiscus sinensis) falsify the assumption that behavioural thermoregulation is possible only for post-hatching stages of the reptile life history. Remarkably, even undeveloped and tiny embryos were able to detect thermal differentials within the egg and move to exploit that small-scale heterogeneity. Research has shown that this behaviour exhibited by reptile embryos may well enhance offspring fitness where movements of these embryos enabled them to maximize heat gain from their surroundings and thus increase their body temperatures. This in turn leads to a variation in the embryonic development rate and the incubation period as well. This could benefit the embryos in which a warmer incubation increases developmental rate and therefore accelerating the hatching process.

On the other hand, decreased incubation periods also may minimize the embryo's exposure to risks of nest predation or lethal extremes thermal conditions where embryos move to cooler regions of the egg during periods of dangerously high temperatures.

In addition, embryonic thermoregulation could enhance hatching fitness via modifications to a range of phenotypic traits where embryos with minimal temperature differences hatch at the same time decreasing the individuals' risk of predation. Therefore, the developmental rates of embryos of reptiles are not passive consequences of maternally enforced decisions about the temperatures that the embryo will experience before hatching. Instead, the embryo's behaviour and physiology combine, allowing the smallest embryos to control aspects of their own pre-hatching environment showing that the embryo is not simply a work in progress, but is a functioning organism with surprisingly sophisticated and effective behaviours.

== Evolution ==
Ectotherms and endotherms undergo different evolutionary perspectives where mammals and birds thermoregulate far more precisely than ectotherms. A major benefit of precise thermoregulation is the ability to enhance performance through thermal specialization. Therefore, mammals and birds are assumed to have evolved relatively narrow performance breadths. Thus, the heterothermy of these endotherms would lead to losses of performance during certain periods and therefore genetic variation in thermosensitivity would enable the evolution of thermal generalists in more heterothermic species. The physiologies of the endotherms allows them to adapt within the constraints imposed by genetics, development, and physics.

On the other side, the mechanisms for thermoregulation did not evolve separately, but rather in connection with other functions. These mechanisms were more likely quantitative rather than qualitative and it involved selection of appropriate habitats, changes in levels of locomotor activity, optimum energy liberation, and conservation of metabolic substrates. The evolution of endothermy is directly linked to the selection for high levels of activity sustained by aerobic metabolism. The evolution of the complex behaviour patterns among the birds and mammals requires the evolution of metabolic systems that support the activity prior to that.

Endothermy in vertebrates evolved along separate, but parallel lines from different groups of reptilian ancestors. The advantages of endothermy are manifested in the ability to occupy thermal areas that exclude many ectothermic vertebrates, a high degree of thermal independence from environmental temperature, high muscular power output and sustained levels of activity. Endothermy, however, is energetically very expensive and requires a great deal of food, compared with ectotherms in order to support high metabolic rates.

== See also ==
- Rat king
