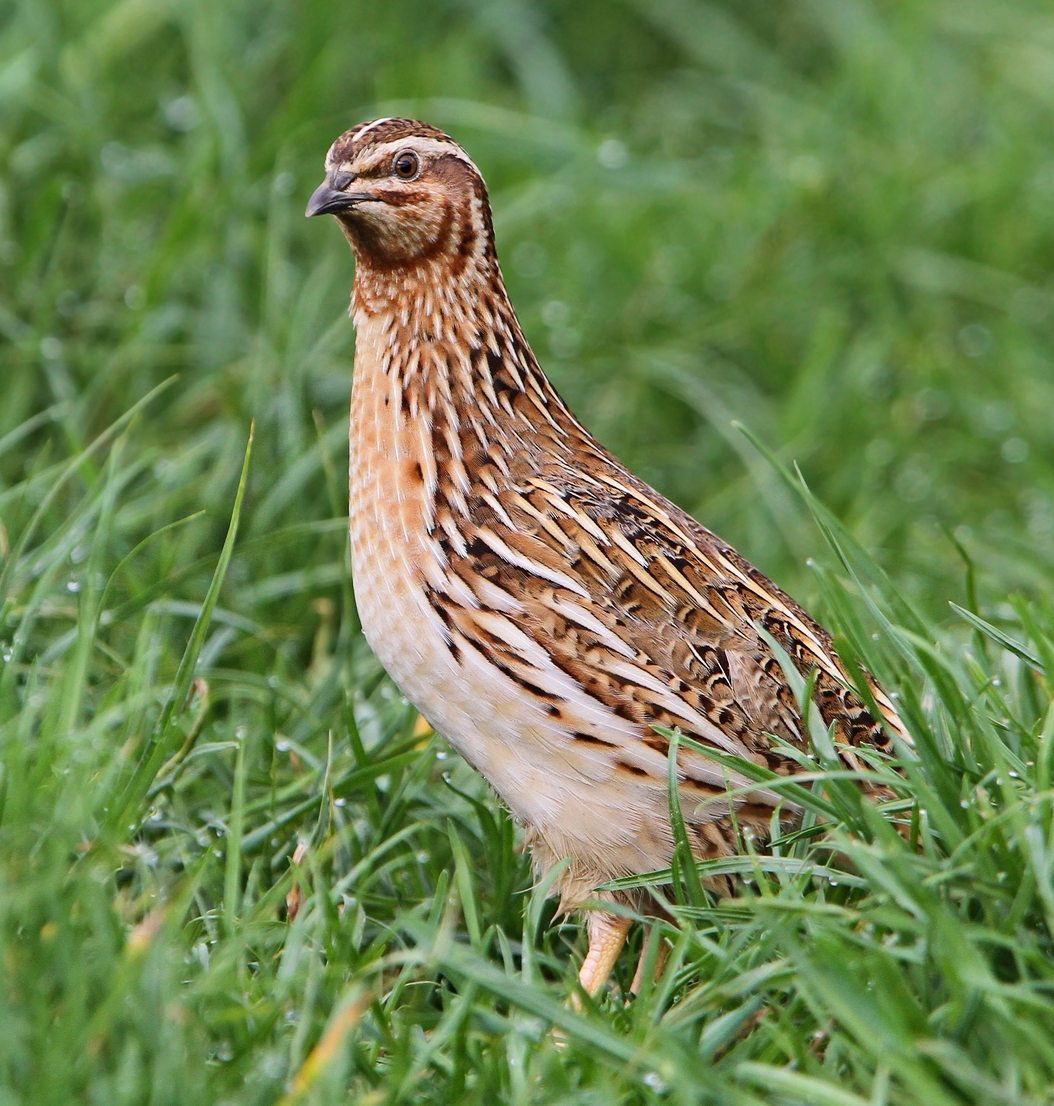

Conservation status
- Least Concern (IUCN 3.1) (Global)

- Near Threatened (IUCN 3.1) (Europe)

Scientific classification
- Kingdom: Animalia
- Phylum: Chordata
- Class: Aves
- Order: Galliformes
- Family: Phasianidae
- Genus: Coturnix
- Species: C. coturnix

Binomial name
- Coturnix coturnix (Linnaeus, 1758)
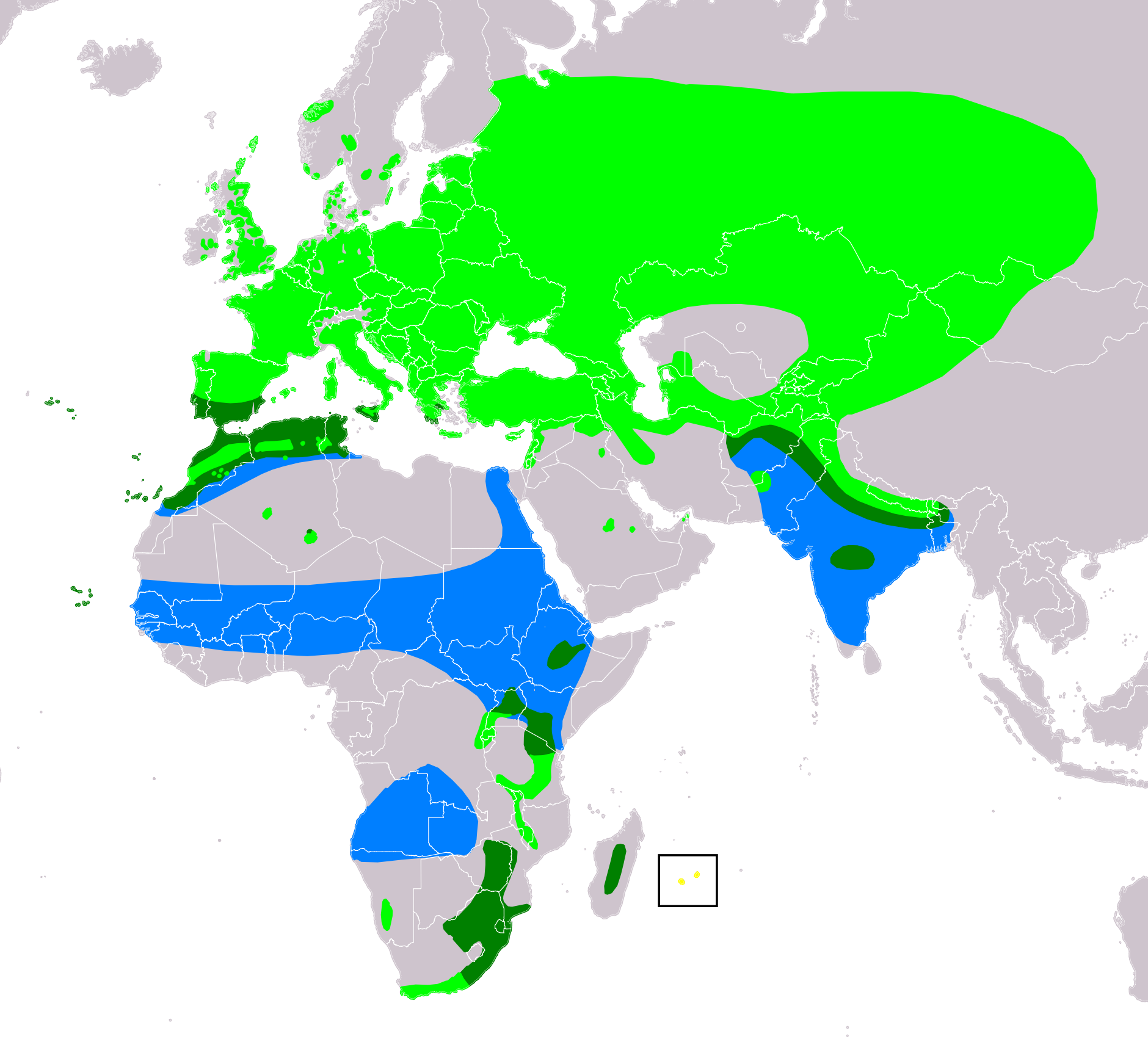
- Range of C. coturnix Breeding Resident Non-breeding Possible extinct & Introduced Extant & Introduced (resident)

Synonyms
- Tetrao coturnix Linnaeus, 1758

Audio
- Male (nominate subsp.) in Germany, and the advertising call in England

= Common quail =

Species of bird

The common quail (Coturnix coturnix) or European quail is a small ground-nesting game bird in the pheasant family Phasianidae. It is mainly migratory, breeding in the Palearctic and wintering in Africa and southern India.

With its characteristic call of three repeated chirps (repeated three times in quick succession), this species of quail is more often heard than seen. It is widespread in Europe and North Africa, and is categorised by the IUCN as "least concern". It should not be confused with the Japanese quail (Coturnix japonica), native to Asia, which, although visually similar, has a call that is very distinct from that of the common quail. Like the Japanese quail, common quails are sometimes kept as poultry.

== Taxonomy ==
The common quail was formally described by the Swedish naturalist Carl Linnaeus in 1758 in the tenth edition of his Systema Naturae under the binomial name Tetrao coturnix. The specific epithet coturnix is the Latin word for the common quail. This species is now placed in the genus Coturnix that was introduced in 1764 by the French naturalist François Alexandre Pierre de Garsault. The common quail was formerly considered to be conspecific with the Japanese quail (Coturnix japonica). The ranges of the two species meet in Mongolia and near Lake Baikal without apparent interbreeding and in captivity the offspring of crosses show reduced fertility. The Japanese quail is therefore now treated as a separate species.

Five subspecies are recognised:

- C. c. coturnix (Linnaeus, 1758) – breeding in Europe and northwest Africa to Mongolia and north India, wintering in Africa and central, south India
- C. c. conturbans Hartert, 1917 – Azores
- C. c. inopinata Hartert, 1917 – Cape Verde Islands
- C. c. africana Temminck & Schlegel, 1848 – sub-Saharan Africa and the three islands
- C. c. erlangeri Zedlitz, 1912 – east and northeast Africa

== Description ==
The common quail is a small compact gallinaceous bird 16–18 cm (6 1/2–7 in) in length with a wingspan of 32–35 cm (12 1/2–14 in). The weight is 70 to 140 g (2 1/2 to 5 oz). It is greatest before migration at the end of the breeding season. The female is generally slightly heavier than the male. It is streaked brown with a white eyestripe, and, in the male, a white chin. As befits its migratory nature, it has long wings, unlike the typically short-winged gamebirds. According to Online Etymology Dictionary, "small migratory game bird of the Old World, late 14c. (early 14c. as a surname, Quayle), from Old French quaille (Modern French caille), perhaps via Medieval Latin quaccula (source also of Provençal calha, Italian quaglia, Portuguese calha, Old Spanish coalla), or directly from a Germanic source (compare Dutch kwartel, Old High German quahtala, German Wachtel, Old English wihtel), imitative of the bird's cry. Or the English word might have come up indigenously from Proto-Germanic."

== Distribution and habitat ==
This is a terrestrial species, feeding on seeds (weed seeds and cereal gleanings) and insects (beetles, true bugs, ants, earwigs, and orthopterans) and their larvae on the ground. It is notoriously difficult to see, keeping hidden in crops, and reluctant to fly, preferring to creep away instead. Even when flushed, it keeps low and soon drops back into cover. Often the only indication of its presence is the distinctive "wet-my-lips" repetitive song of the male. The call is uttered mostly in the mornings, evenings and sometimes at night. It is a strongly migratory bird, unlike most game birds.

The common quail has been introduced onto the island of Mauritius on several occasions but has failed to establish itself and is now probably extinct.

== Behaviour and ecology ==
=== Breeding ===
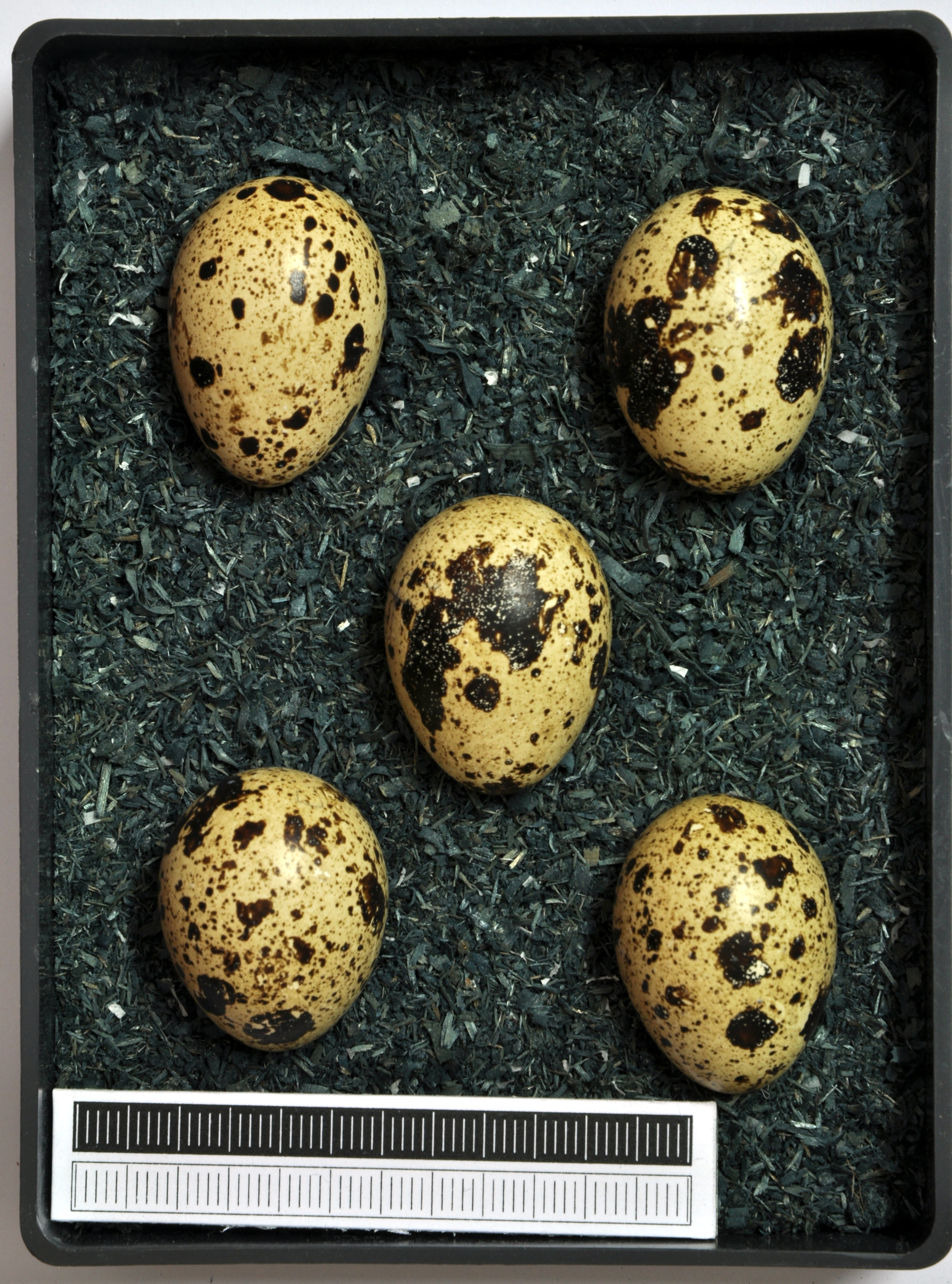
Eggs

Males generally arrive in the breeding area before the females. In northern Europe laying begins from the middle of May, and with repeat laying can continue to the end of August. The female forms a shallow scrape in the ground 7–13.5 cm (2 3/4–5 1/4 in) in diameter which is sparsely lined with vegetation. The eggs are laid at 24-hour intervals to form a clutch of between 8 and 13 eggs. These have an off-white to creamy yellow background with dark brown spots or blotches. Their average dimensions are 30 mm × 23 mm (1 1/8 in × 7/8 in) with a weight of 8 g (1/4 oz). The eggs are incubated by the female alone beginning after all the eggs are laid. The eggs hatch synchronously after 17–20 days. The young are precocial and shortly after hatching leave the nest and can feed themselves. They are cared for by the female who broods them while they are small. The young fledge when around 19 days of age but stay in the family group for 30–50 days. They generally first breed when one year old and only have a single brood.

== Relationship to humans ==
The common quail is heavily hunted as game on passage through the Mediterranean area. Very large numbers are caught in nets along the Mediterranean coast of Egypt. It is estimated that in 2012, during the autumn migration, 3.4 million birds were caught in northern Sinai and perhaps as many as 12.9 million in the whole of Egypt.

This species over recent years has seen an increase in its propagation in the United States and Europe. However, most of this increase is with hobbyists. It is declining in parts of its range such as Ireland.

In 1537, Queen Jane Seymour, third wife of Henry VIII, then pregnant with the future King Edward VI, developed an insatiable craving for quail, and courtiers and diplomats abroad were ordered to find sufficient supplies for the Queen.

=== Poisoning ===
If common quails have eaten certain plants, although which plants is still in debate, the meat from quail can be poisonous, with one in four who consume poisonous flesh becoming ill with coturnism, which is characterized by muscle soreness, and which may lead to kidney failure.

== In culture ==
In the Bible, the Book of Numbers chapter 11 describes a story of a huge mass of quails that were blown by a wind and were taken as meat by the Israelites in the wilderness.

== Gallery ==
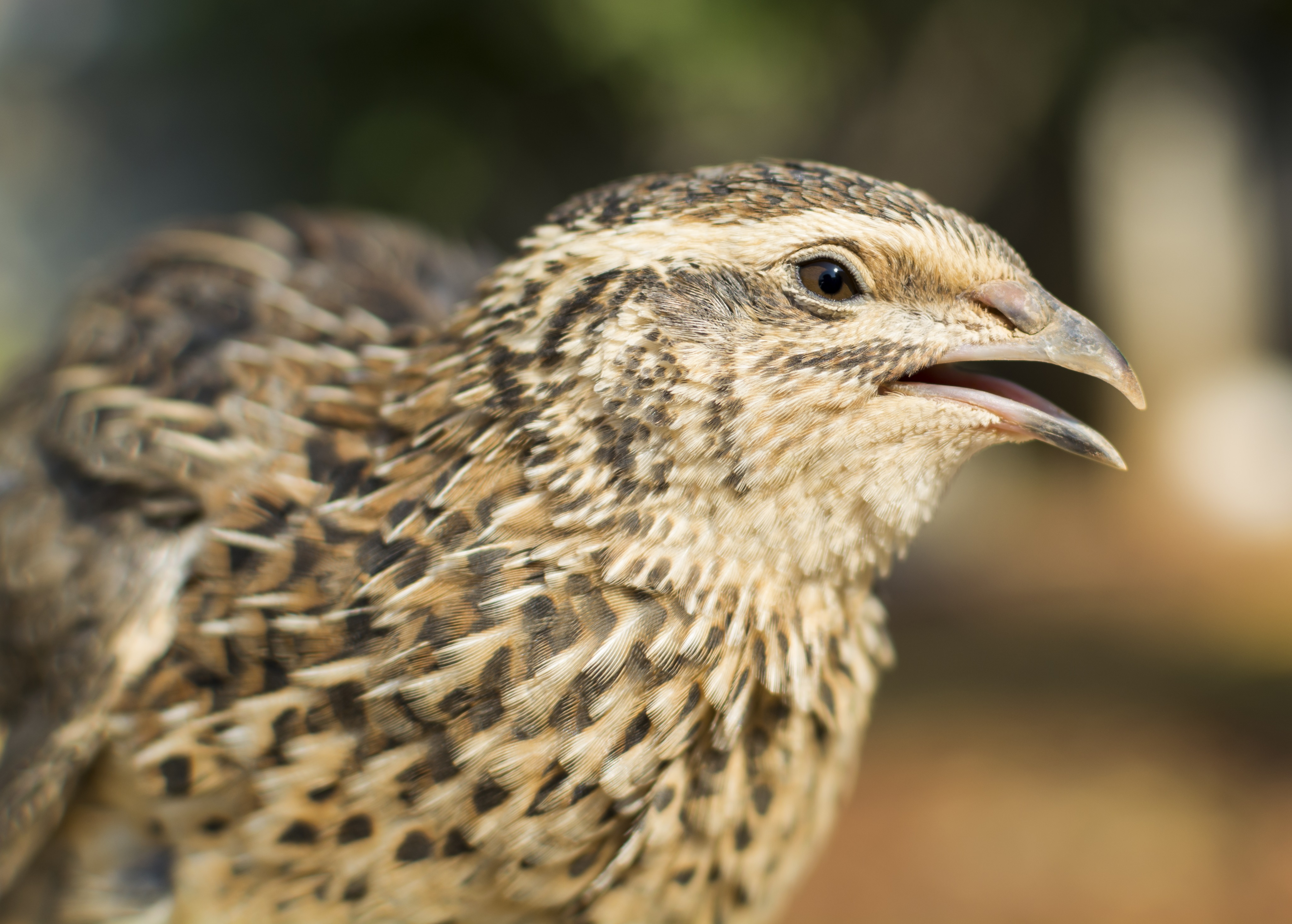
Head of female of the nominate subspecies

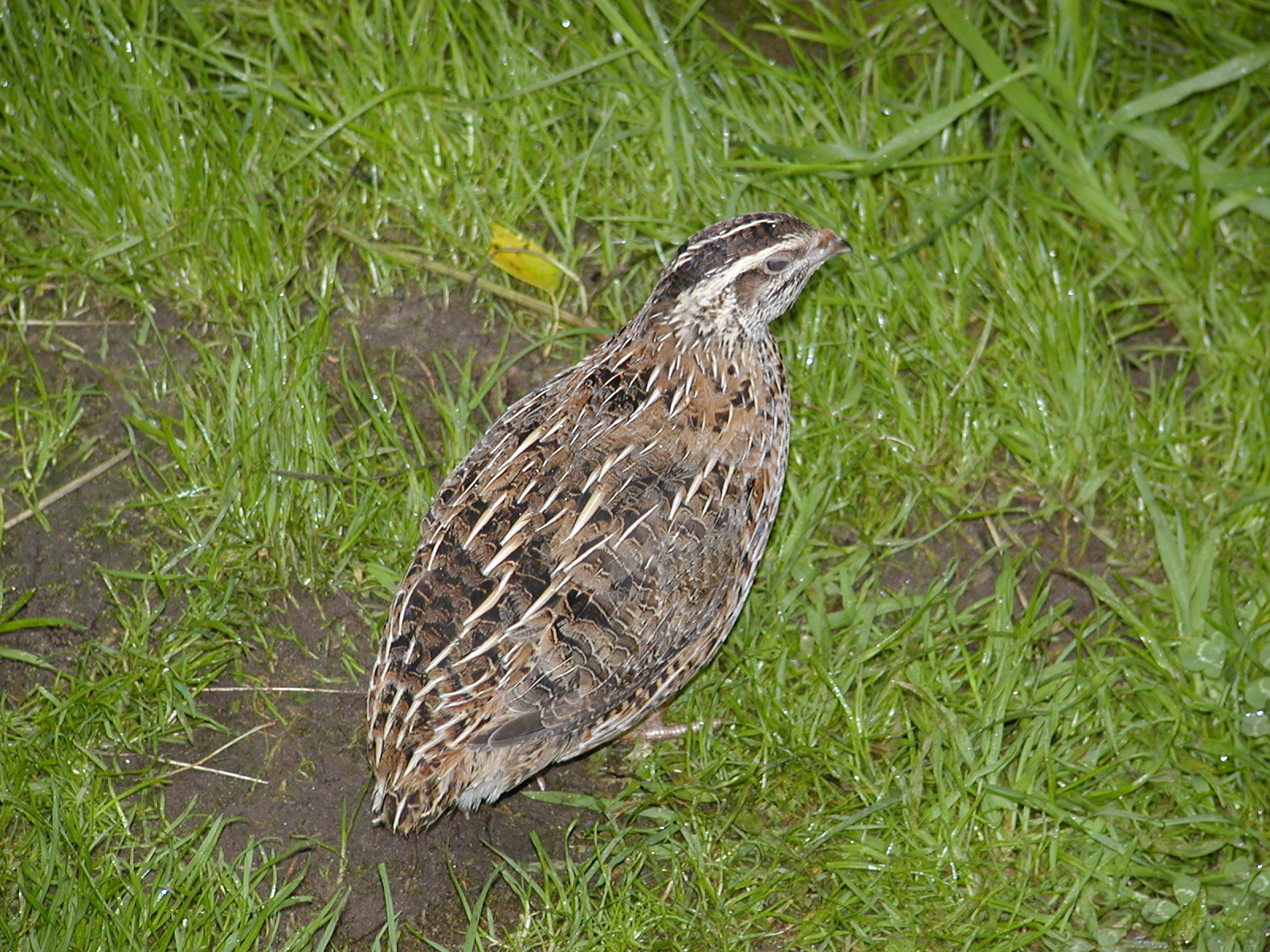
Female

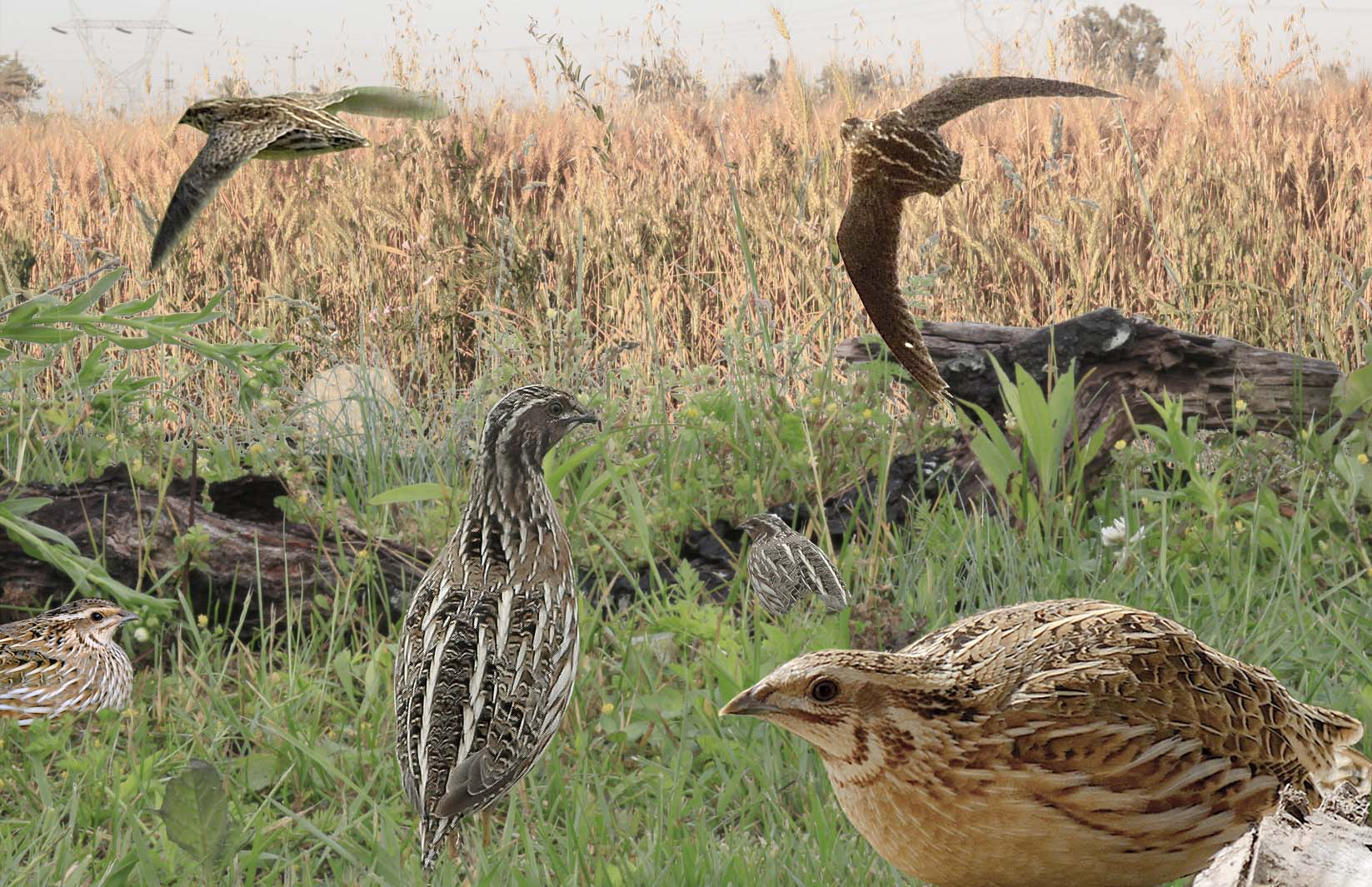
ID composite

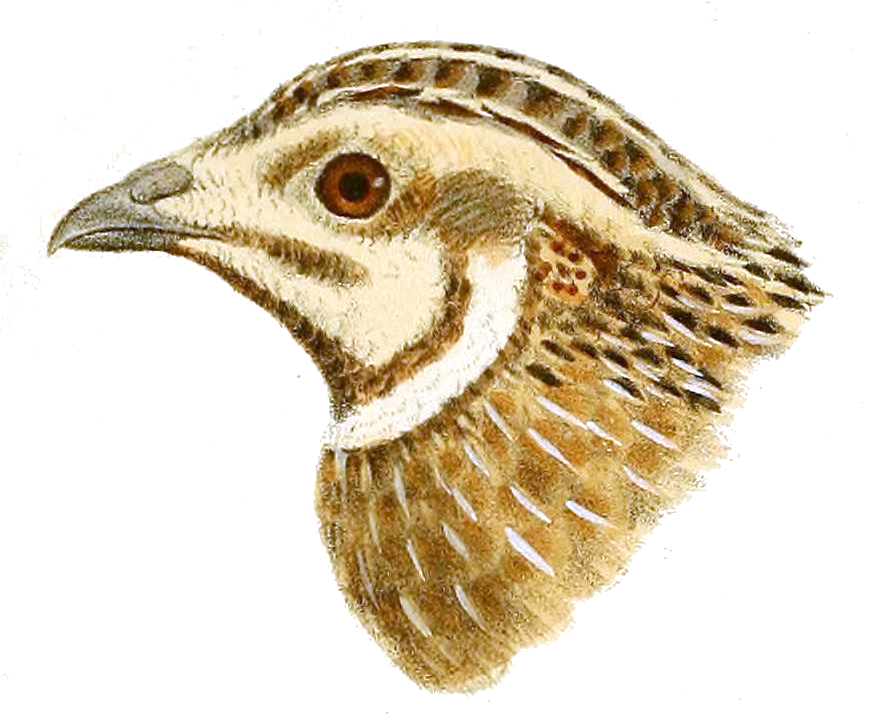
Head of nominate subspecies

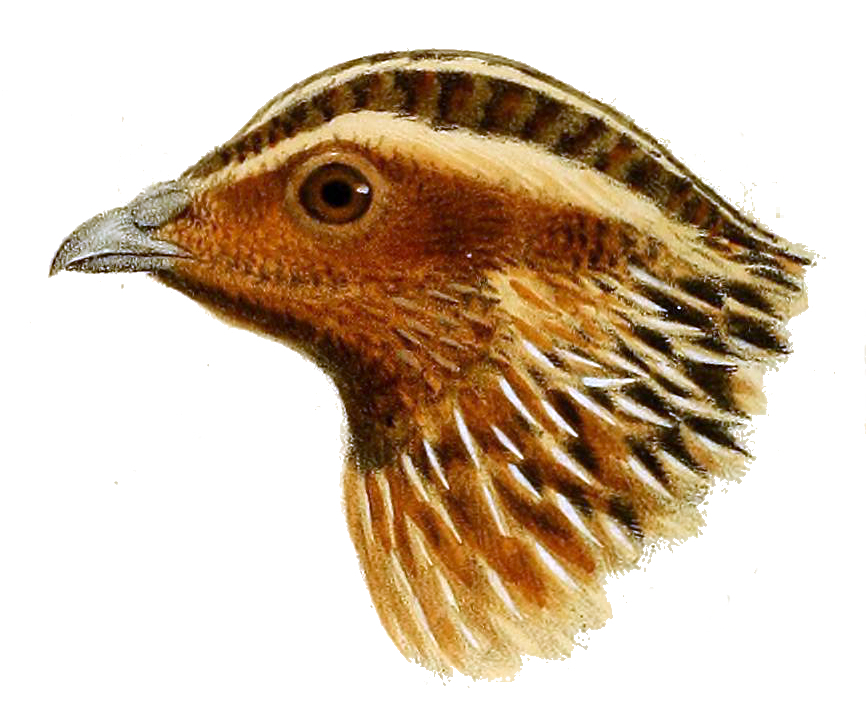
Head of Coturnix coturnix africana

== See also ==
- Quails in cookery

== Sources ==
- Cramp, Stanley, ed. (1980). "Coturnix coturnix Quail". Handbook of the Birds of Europe the Middle East and North Africa. The Birds of the Western Palearctic. Vol. II: Hawks to Bustards. Oxford: Oxford University Press. pp. 496–503. ISBN 978-0-19-857505-4.
