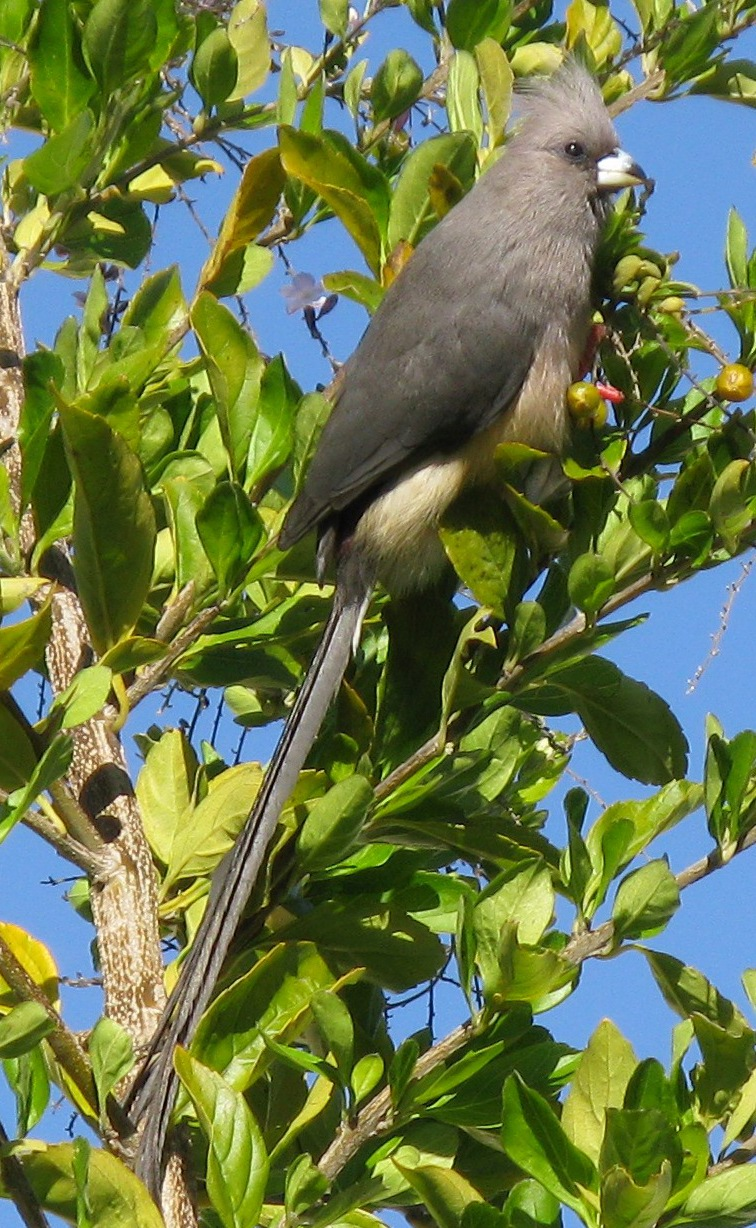
- The black-tipped bill is diagnostic among local species of mousebirds

Conservation status
- Least Concern (IUCN 3.1)

Scientific classification
- Kingdom: Animalia
- Phylum: Chordata
- Class: Aves
- Order: Coliiformes
- Family: Coliidae
- Genus: Colius
- Species: C. colius

Binomial name
- Colius colius (Linnaeus, 1766)

Synonyms
- Loxia colius Linnaeus, 1766

= White-backed mousebird =

Species of bird

The white-backed mousebird (Colius colius) is a large species of mousebird. It is distributed in western and central regions of southern Africa from Namibia and southern Botswana eastwards to Central Transvaal and the eastern Cape.

This mousebird prefers scrubby dry habitats, such as thornveld, fynbos scrub and semi-desert.

== Description ==
This bird is about 34 cm (13.5 in) long, with the tail comprising approximately half the length, and weighs 38–64 g (1.3–2.3 oz). The upper parts, head, prominent crest and breast are grey apart from a white back stripe flanked by two broad black stripes and a dark red, or maroon, transverse band at the base of the tail. The white is not visible unless the wings are at least partly open, such as when the birds are alighting, or sometimes in hot weather. The belly is buff in colour. The bill is bluish white with a black tip, and the legs and feet are red.

The speckled mousebird can be distinguished from this species by its differently coloured beak, legs and upperparts.

The white-backed mousebird has a whistled zwee-wewit call. It also has a buzzing or crackling call that might be for alarm or keeping in contact with the group.

== Ecology ==
The white-backed mousebird is a frugivore which subsists on fruits, berries, leaves, seeds and nectar. It also will feed on the buds of some plants, sometimes to the extent of stripping the branches of ornamentals such as fiddlewoods. Its feeding habits make it very unpopular with fruit farmers and domestic gardeners, which might be why it is very shy as a rule. When it spots a human it either sits quietly in a tree or takes off immediately. Sometimes it will settle on lawns when the grass is flowering and feed on the grass stigmata and stamens. In the wild its fruit-eating habits are an important factor in disseminating seeds of indigenous berry-producing plants such as Halleria lucida. However, it also spreads the seeds of invasive aliens such as Cotoneaster.

In handling mousebirds the tail should be avoided, as the long rectrices come out so easily as to suggest that it is a sacrificial defence mechanism.

This is a markedly social bird, with small groups of presumably related birds feeding together and engaging in mutual preening. It roosts in groups at night. Its perching habits are amusingly parrot-like; it often almost hangs from its legs rather than squatting on them like most birds, and commonly with each leg gripping a different upright branch.

These sedentary birds may breed at any time of the year when conditions are favourable. The nest is a large cup well hidden in a thicket. Nestlings are fed by both parents and also by helpers, usually young birds from previous clutches.

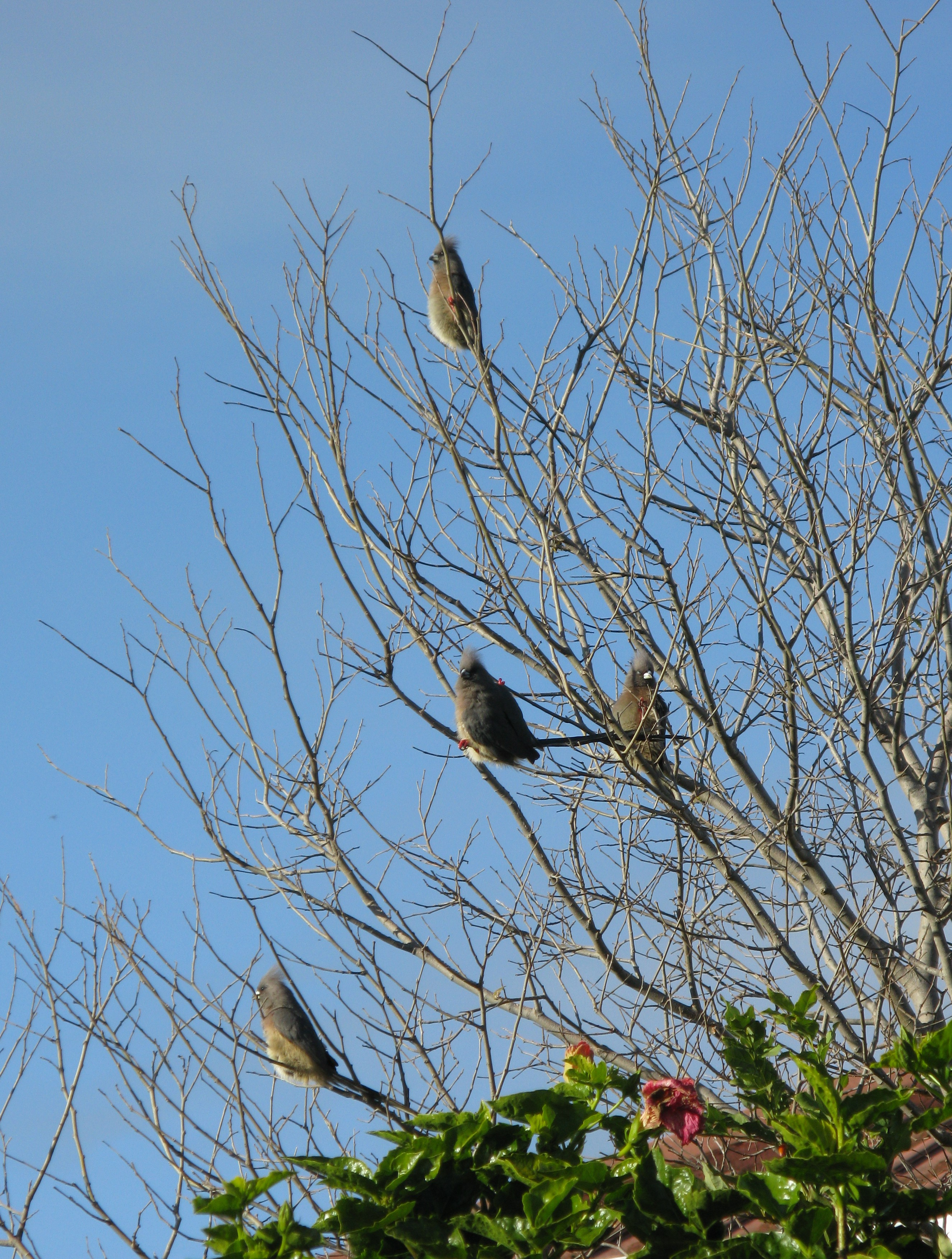
These members of a family group show the typical attitude in which mousebirds hang in trees, in this case directing their bellies to make the most of chilly winter sunshine. Note the monkey-like grip and the opposed, paired toes, shown most clearly by the bird in the centre.

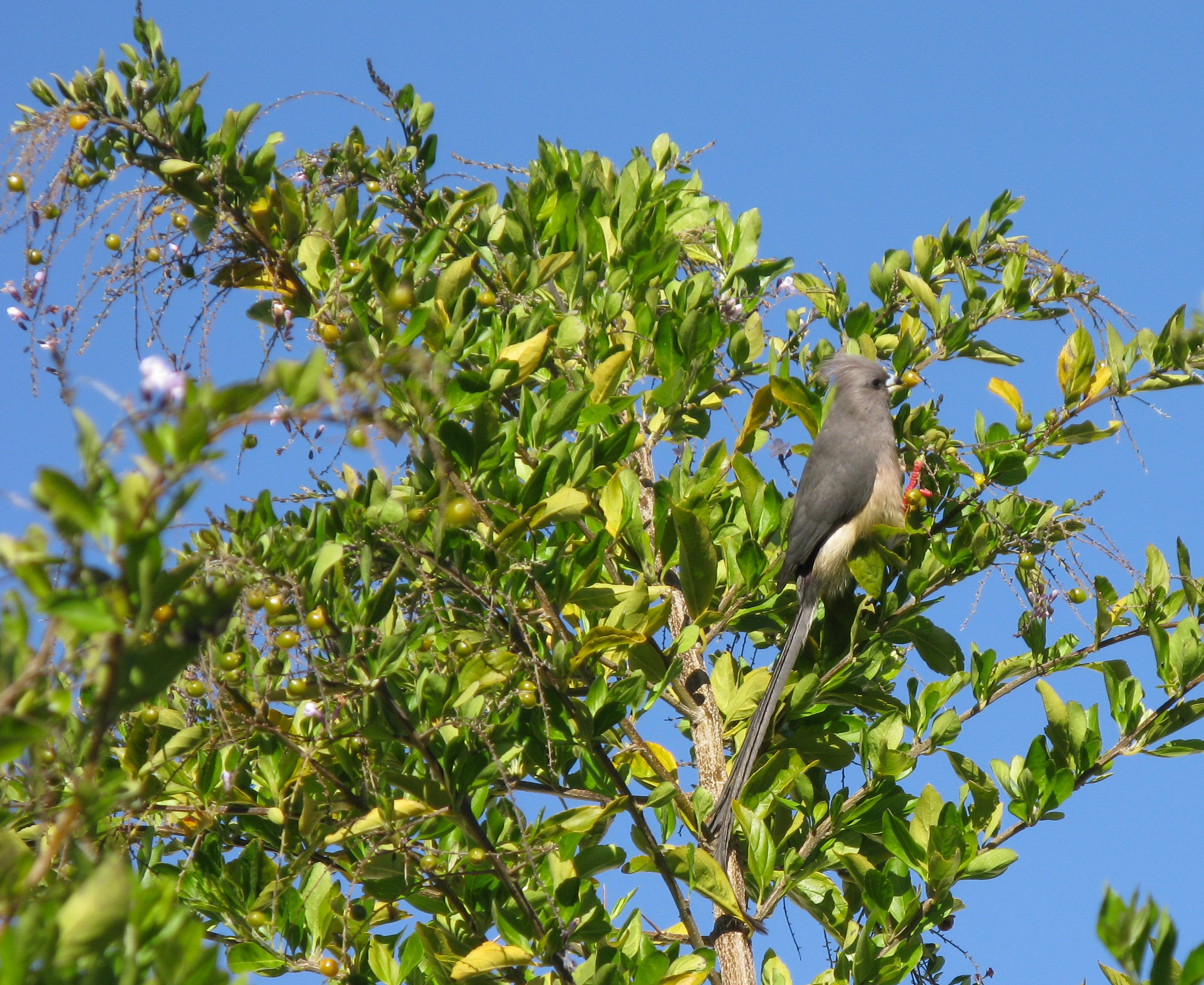
Colius white-backed mousebird feeding on duranta berries

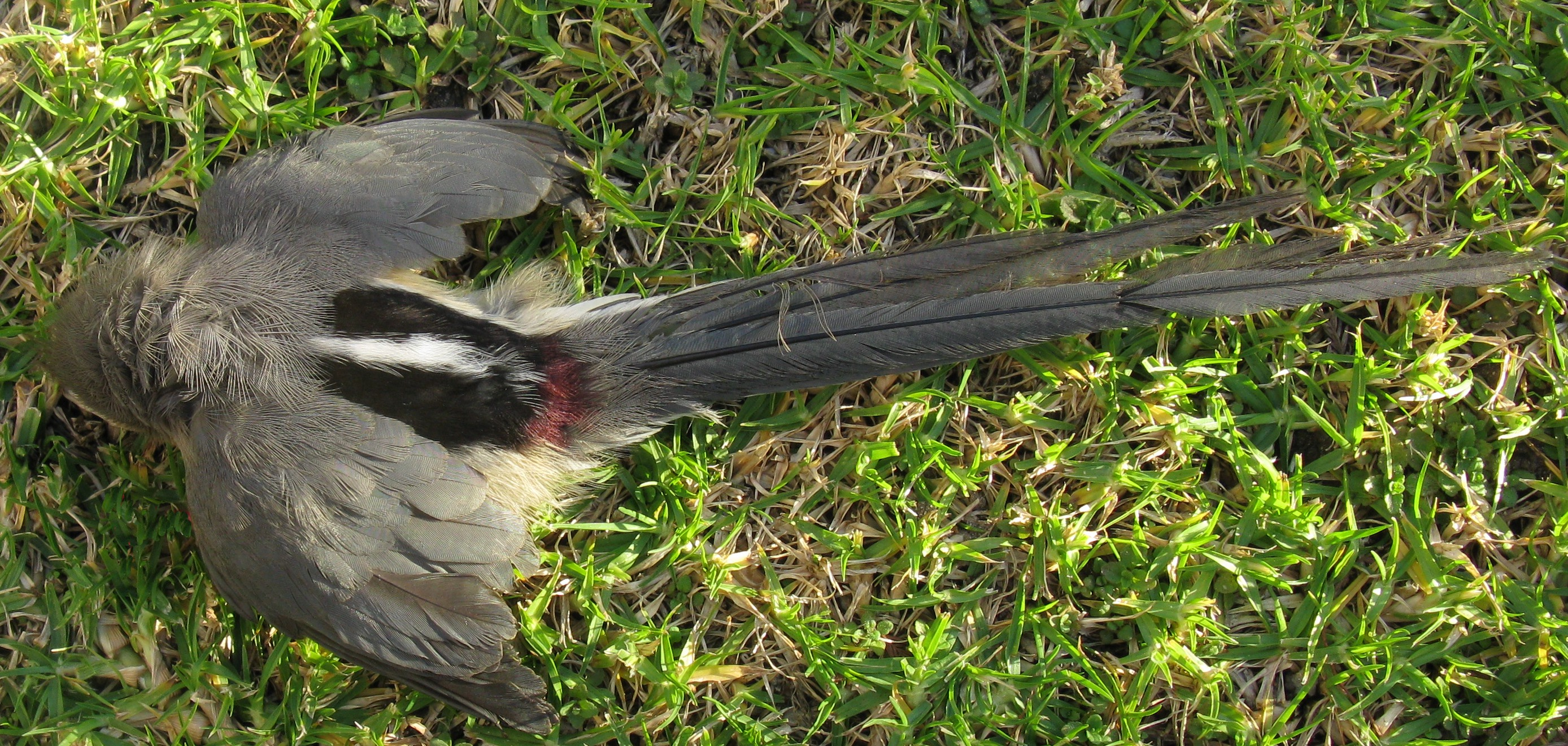
This dead specimen shows details of the dorsal plumage that seldom are visible on live specimens in the field.
