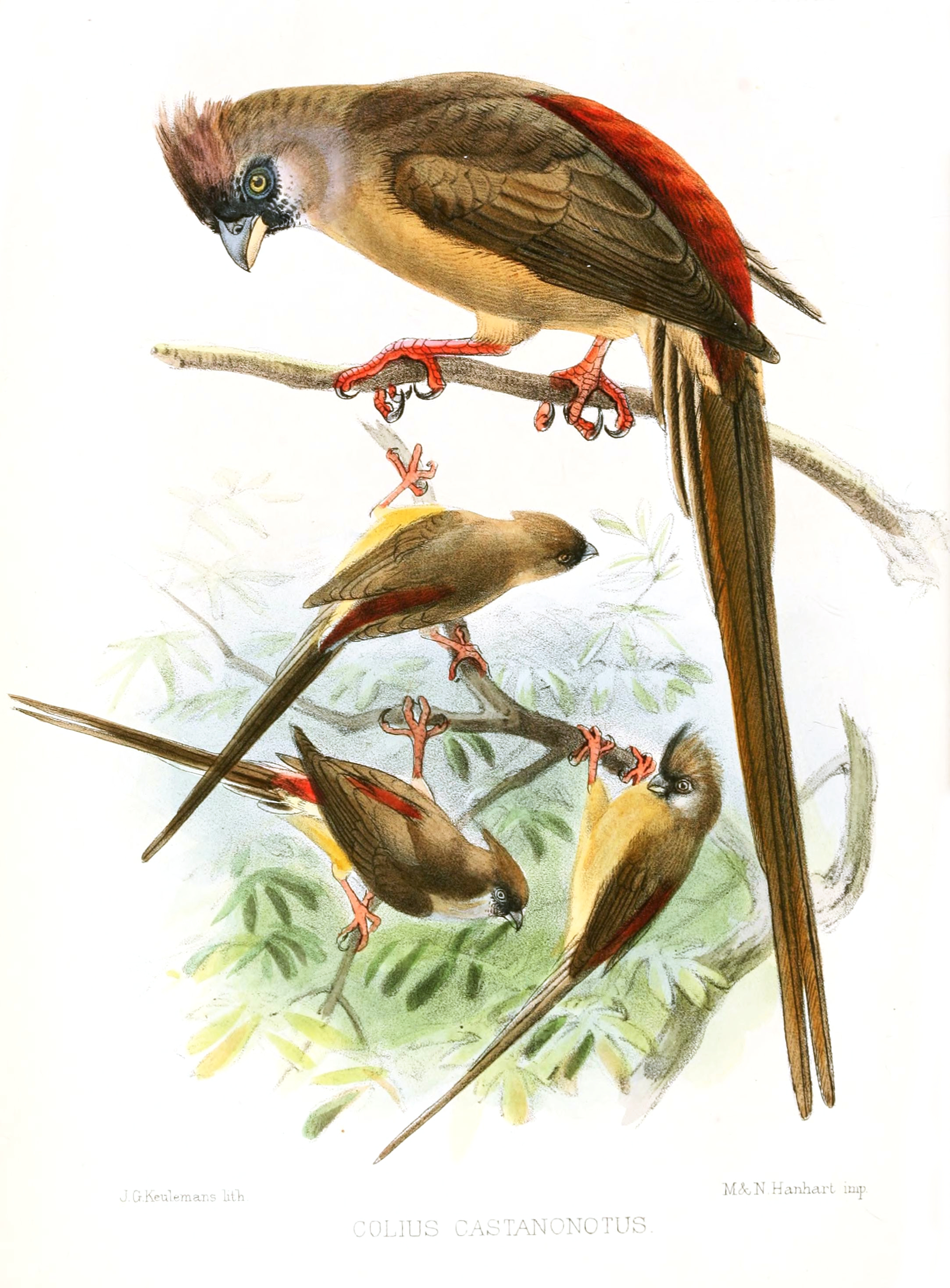

Conservation status
- Least Concern (IUCN 3.1)

Scientific classification
- Kingdom: Animalia
- Phylum: Chordata
- Class: Aves
- Order: Coliiformes
- Family: Coliidae
- Genus: Colius
- Species: C. castanotus

Binomial name
- Colius castanotus Verreaux & Verreaux, 1855
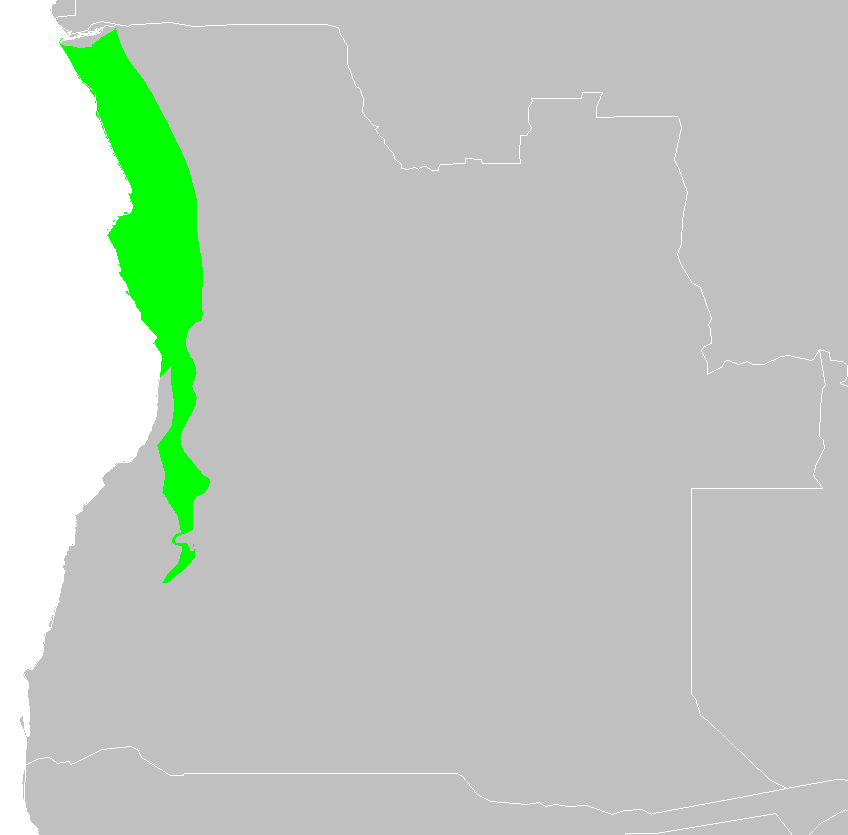
- General range: Angolan scarp savanna and woodlands

= Red-backed mousebird =

Species of bird

The red-backed mousebird (Colius castanotus) is a species of bird in the Coliidae family. It is found in Angola and the Democratic Republic of the Congo. The name mousebird is based on bird's soft feathers with texture similar to a mouse's fur. The red-backed mousebird got its name from the red or chestnut color patch on its back.

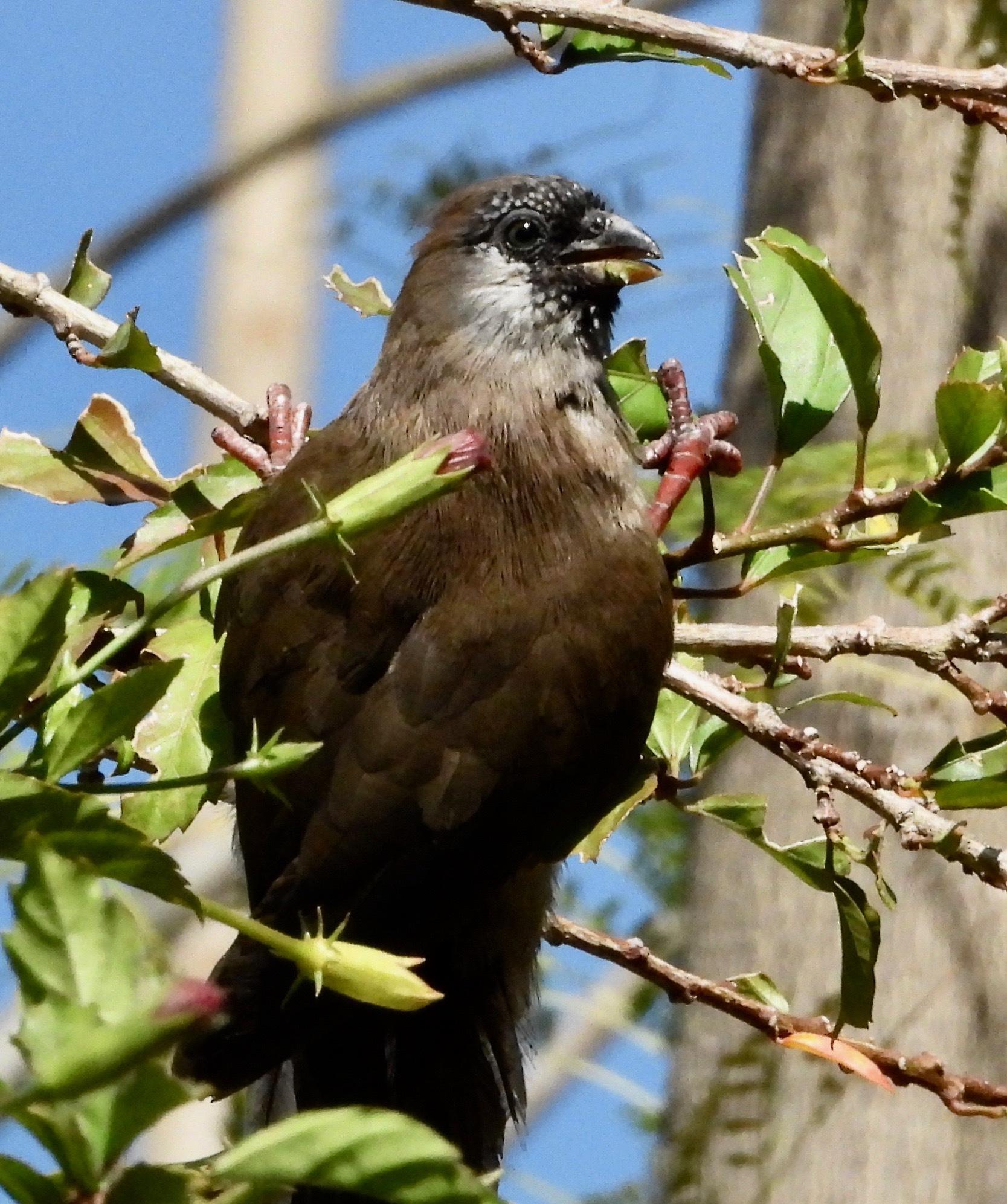
In Angola

== Description ==
Its average size ranges from 11 to 15 inches and it weighs around 1 to 3 ounces.

Like other mousebirds, Colius castanotus possesses feathers that resembles the soft fur of a mouse, but it is notable for its red or chestnut patch on it back. The red-backed mousebird is not adapted for long-distance flights. The wings of the mousebird are described as short and rounded.

The longevity of the red-backed mouse is 10 to 12 years.

== Range and habitat ==
River borders that provide water sources for vegetation like trees and bushes are the prefect ideal homes for mousebirds. Their environment is located near the rivers between borders both southern Angola and northern Namibia. The red-backed mousebird prefers less dense forests than those favorable to other mousebirds. Shrubs are also favored, especially with thorns, to keep predators away from their nests.

The red-backed mousebird's nest structure is characterized as "cup-like, thick and untidy state".

== Diet ==
The red-backed mousebird's diet consist of plants such as berries and seeds that can be consumed from their environment or from the crops on farms. However, mousebirds tend to ruin the cultivated fields which makes them minor disruptions in maintaining crop fields. Other diet components include small animals such as insects, spiders, and other vertebrates such as lizards and frogs.

== Behavior and Reproduction ==
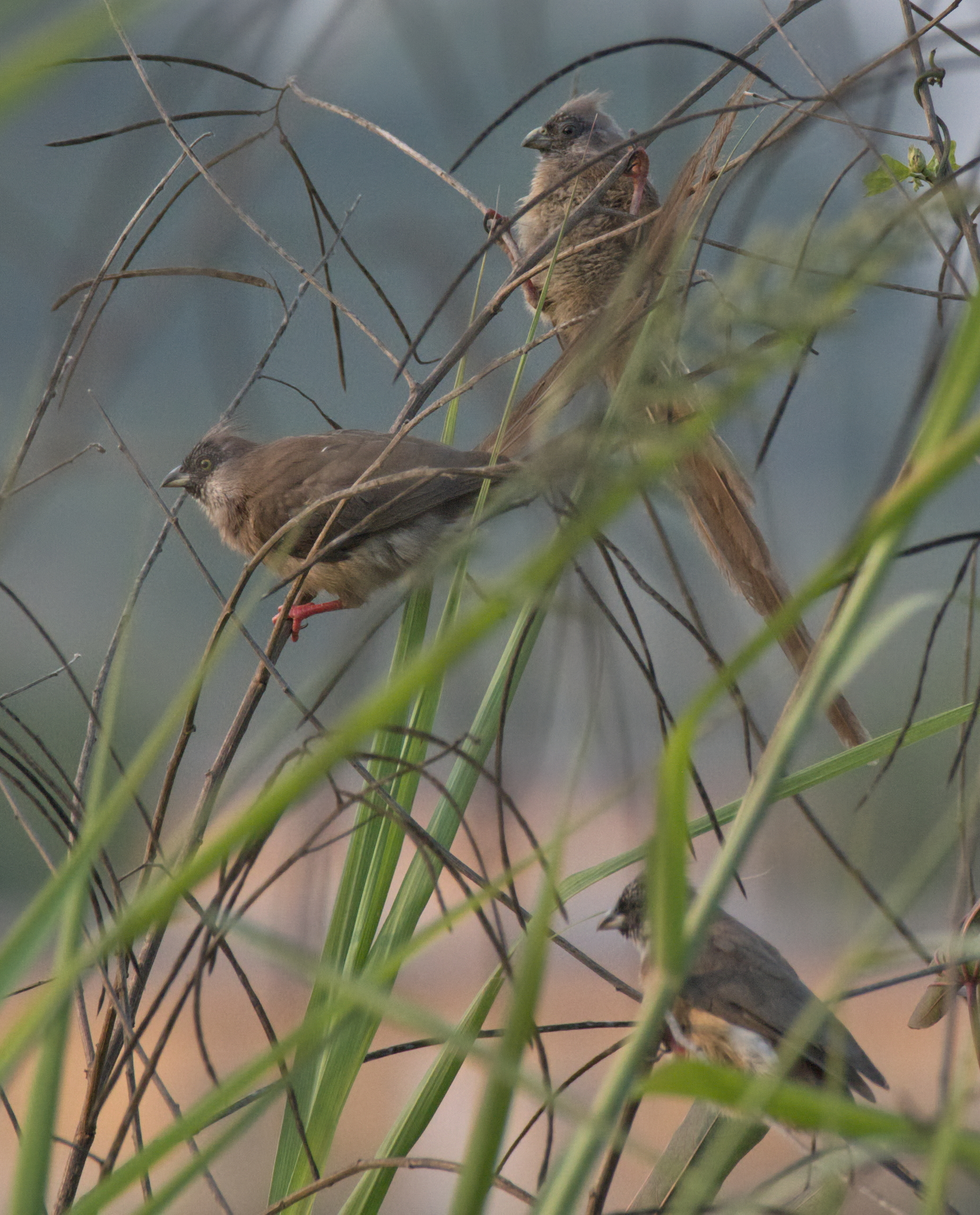
Red-backed mousebird

Red-backed mousebirds are social birds, living together in groups. They usually travel in flocks ranging from 6 to 24 with other mousebird groups. However, they do not migrate to other locations when the temperatures get cool, unlike many common birds. The average red-backed mousebird's daily routine is simple – eating, drinking water, and bathing in the dust. The mousebird's metabolism level is most active during the daytime.

Both parents take turns incubating the eggs. Yet the parenting skills of the red-backed mousebird are different, in that the young rely not only on their parents but the community as well. Other parents may help group members, another male may guard the nest and a female may share her nest with another female to incubate her eggs. The female red-backed mousebird lays 2 to 4 eggs per clutch. The eggs are white with blackish and brownish specks.
