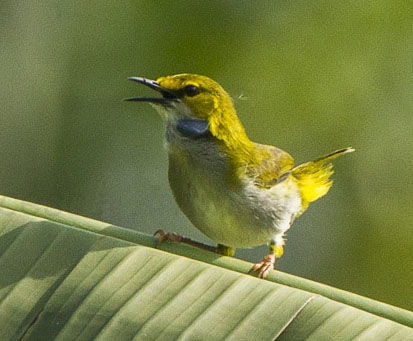
- Near Kakum in Ghana

Conservation status
- Least Concern (IUCN 3.1)

Scientific classification
- Kingdom: Animalia
- Phylum: Chordata
- Class: Aves
- Order: Passeriformes
- Family: Cisticolidae
- Genus: Camaroptera
- Species: C. superciliaris

Binomial name
- Camaroptera superciliaris (Fraser, 1843)

= Yellow-browed camaroptera =

Species of bird

The yellow-browed camaroptera (Camaroptera superciliaris) is a species of bird in the family Cisticolidae. It is mainly native to the African tropical rainforest. Its natural habitats are subtropical or tropical moist lowland forests and subtropical or tropical moist shrubland.

The yellow-browed camaroptera was described by the English zoologist Louis Fraser in 1843 under the binomial name Sylvicola superciliaris. The type locality is the island of Bioko (formerly Fernando Pó) in the Gulf of Guinea off the west coast of Africa. The specific epithet superciliaris is from the Neo-Latin superciliaris, "eyebrowed" from the classical Latin supercilium, "eyebrow".
