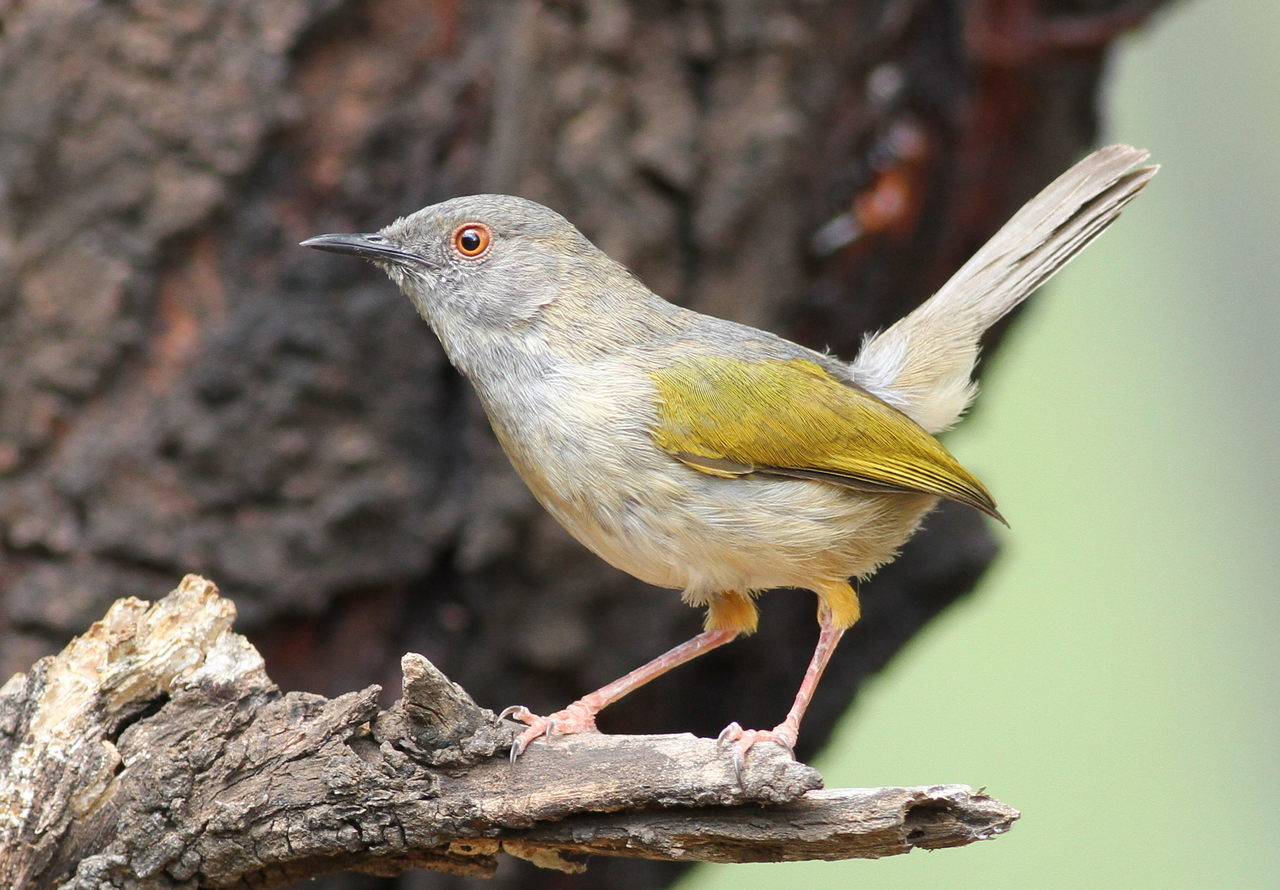

Scientific classification
- Kingdom: Animalia
- Phylum: Chordata
- Class: Aves
- Order: Passeriformes
- Family: Cisticolidae
- Genus: Camaroptera
- Species: C. brevicaudata

Binomial name
- Camaroptera brevicaudata (Cretzschmar, 1830)

Audio
- Song recorded in Kitale, Kenya

= Grey-backed camaroptera =

Species of bird

The grey-backed camaroptera (Camaroptera brevicaudata) is a small bird in the family Cisticolidae. This bird is a resident breeder in Africa south of the Sahara Desert. Recent studies suggest this species and the green-backed camaroptera may be the same species.

This skulking passerine is typically found low in dense cover. The grey-backed camaroptera binds large leaves together low in a bush and builds a grass nest within the leaves. The normal clutch is two or three eggs.

This 11.5 cm (4.5 in) long warbler has grey upper parts and a grey short cocked tail. The wings are olive and the underparts whitish grey. The sexes are similar, but juveniles are paler yellow on the breast.

Like most warblers, grey-backed camaroptera is insectivorous. The call is a whining sheee...sheee and a bleating maa, that gave rise to its previous name bleating warbler or bleating camaroptera. The song is a crisp twik twik twik twik twik.

The grey-backed camaroptera was described by the German physician and zoologist Philipp Jakob Cretzschmar in 1830 under the binomial name Sylvia brevicaudata. The type locality is the former province of Kurdufan in Sudan. The specific epithet brevicaudata is from Latin brevis for "short" and caudatus for "-tailed". There are 11 recognised subspecies.
