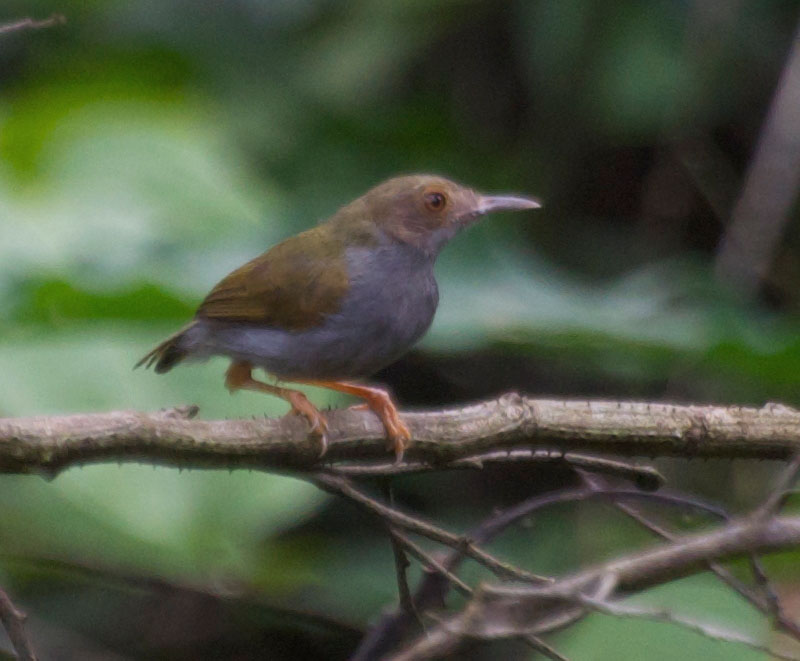
- In the Nsuta Forest, Ghana

Conservation status
- Least Concern (IUCN 3.1)

Scientific classification
- Kingdom: Animalia
- Phylum: Chordata
- Class: Aves
- Order: Passeriformes
- Family: Cisticolidae
- Genus: Camaroptera
- Species: C. chloronota

Binomial name
- Camaroptera chloronota Reichenow, 1895

= Olive-green camaroptera =

Species of bird

The olive-green camaroptera (Camaroptera chloronota) is a bird species in the family Cisticolidae, mainly native to the African tropical rainforest.

== Taxonomy ==
The olive-green camaroptera was described by the German ornithologist Anton Reichenow in 1895 under its current binomial name Camaroptera chloronota. The type locality is the forest of Missahohe in the West African state of Togo. The specific epithet chloronota is from the Ancient Greek khlōros meaning "green" and -nōtos meaning "-backed".

There are five subspecies:

- C. c. kelsalli Sclater, WL, 1927 – Senegal to Ghana
- C. c. chloronota Reichenow, 1895 – Togo to Cameroon, Gabon and Congo
- C. c. granti Alexander, 1903 – Bioko Island
- C. c. kamitugaensis Prigogine, 1961 – east DR Congo
- C. c. toroensis (Jackson, 1905) – Central African Republic and central DR Congo to southwest Kenya and northwest Tanzania (sometimes treated as a separate species)

It tends to fly in flocks of 50–100, so far it avoids intercontinental migration.
