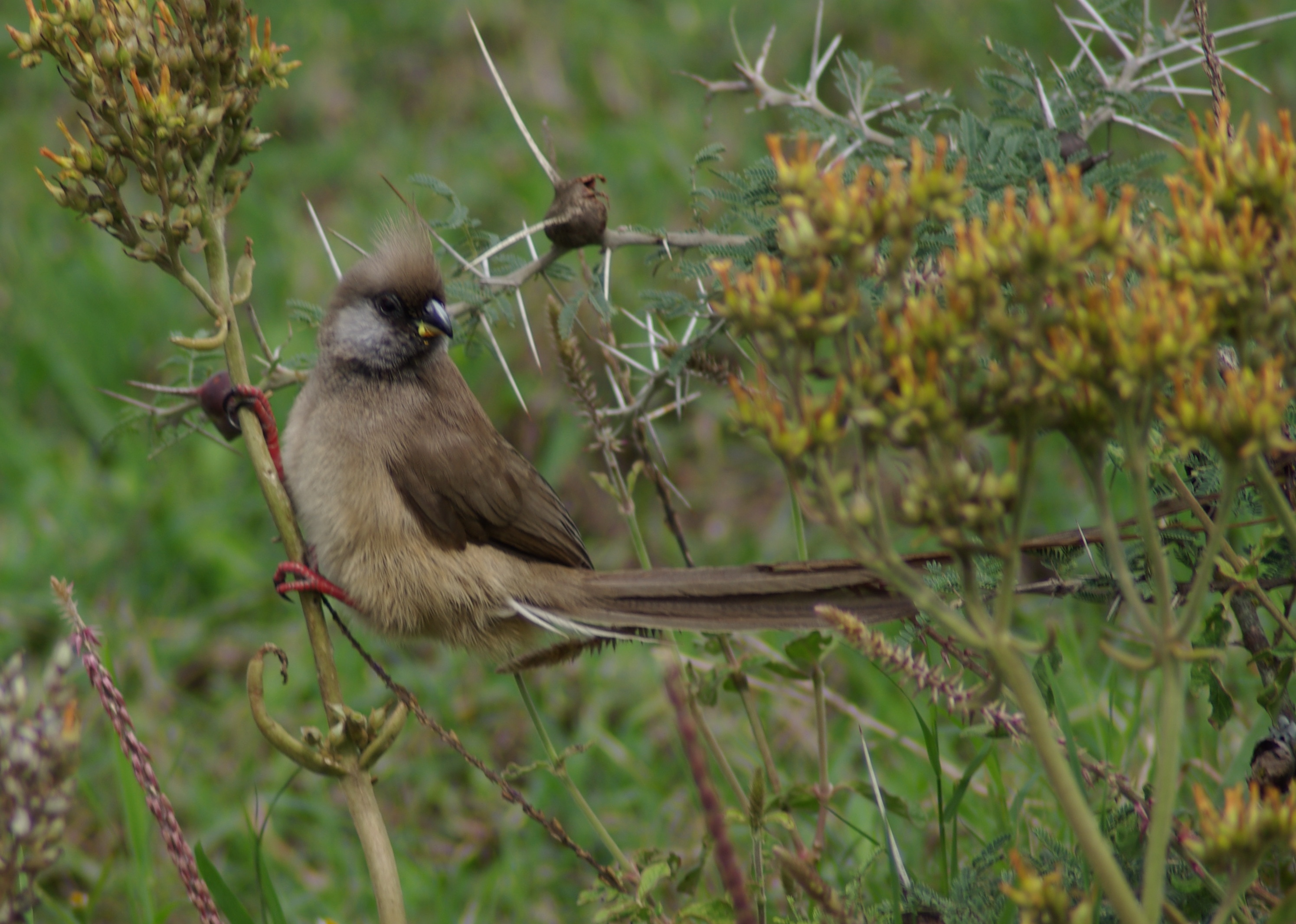
- Speckled mousebird, Colius striatus

Scientific classification
- Kingdom: Animalia
- Phylum: Chordata
- Class: Aves
- Order: Coliiformes
- Family: Coliidae
- Genus: Colius; Brisson, 1760

Type species
- Loxia colius Linnaeus, 1766

Species
- Colius colius Colius castanotus Colius leucocephalus Colius striatus

= Colius =

Genus of birds

Colius is a genus of mousebirds in the family Coliidae. The four species are widely distributed in Africa. Two other African mousebirds are placed in the genus Urocolius.

The genus Colius was introduced by the French zoologist Mathurin Jacques Brisson in 1760 with the white-backed mousebird (Colius colius) as the type species.

The genus contains the following four species:

Image	Scientific name	Common name	Distribution
	Colius colius	White-backed mousebird	southern Africa from Namibia and southern Botswana eastwards to Central Transvaal and the eastern Cape
	Colius castanotus	Red-backed mousebird	Angola and the Democratic Republic of the Congo
	Colius leucocephalus	White-headed mousebird	southern Somalia and parts of Kenya with its range just extending into southern Ethiopia and northern Tanzania
	Colius striatus	Speckled mousebird	Cameroon east to Eritrea and Ethiopia, south through eastern Africa to southern South Africa

A fossil species, Colius hendeyi, was described from Early Pliocene remains found at Langebaanweg in South Africa.

Some Miocene taxa from France were previously assigned to Colius. Of these, only the Middle Miocene "Colius" palustris might plausibly belong there, but it is more often separated in Necrornis. In younger lineages like Passeriformes, extant genera (e.g. Menura and Orthonyx) were around by then, though simply because two taxa are of same taxonomic rank, they do not need to be of the same age. All that can be said is that while it cannot be ruled out that the modern genus Colius was around in Miocene Europe, it more likely evolved later, and probably in sub-Saharan Africa.

"Colius" archiaci, "C." consobrinus and "C." paludicola on the other hand are 3 taxa described from fragmentary remains found at Saint-Gérand-le-Puy. Their taxonomic history is convoluted, being initially described as woodpeckers and variously merged and split. Today it is believed that they might all belong to a species in the modern genus Urocolius, or at least 2 into a prehistoric genus Limnatornis.
