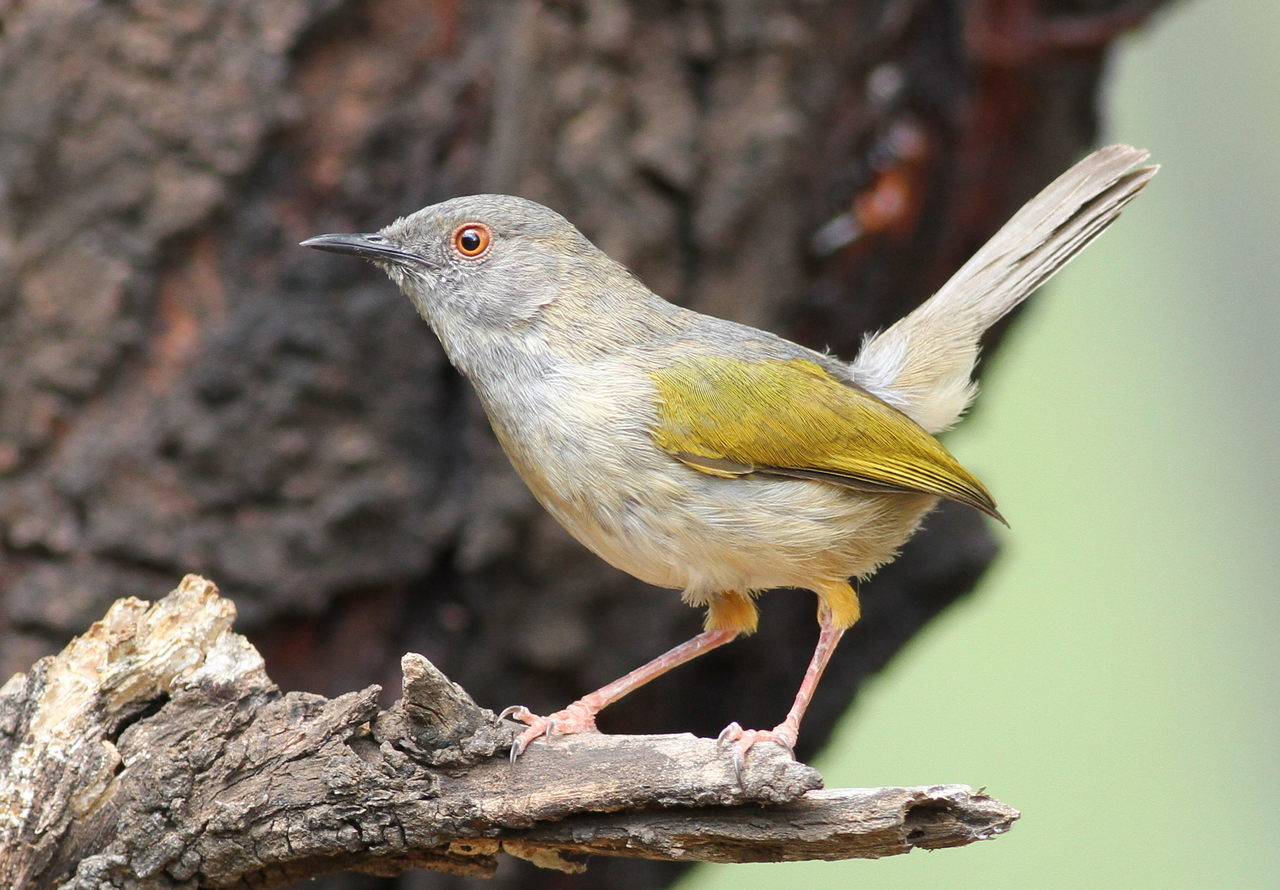
- Grey-backed camaroptera (Camaroptera brevicaudata)

Scientific classification
- Kingdom: Animalia
- Phylum: Chordata
- Class: Aves
- Order: Passeriformes
- Family: Cisticolidae
- Genus: Camaroptera; Sundevall, 1850

Type species
- Camaroptera olivacea Sundevall, 1850

= Camaroptera =

Genus of birds

Camaroptera is a genus of small passerine birds in the family Cisticolidae that are found in sub-Saharan Africa.

The genus was erected by the Swedish zoologist Carl Jakob Sundevall in 1850. The type species is the green-backed camaroptera (Camaroptera brachyura). The genus name Camaroptera comes from Ancient Greek καμαρα (kamara), meaning "arch", and πτερόν (pterón), meaning "wing".

== Species ==
The genus contains the following five species:

Image	Common name	Scientific name	Distribution
	Green-backed camaroptera	Camaroptera brachyura	Zambia, Kenya, Malawi, Mozambique, and Tanzania
	Grey-backed camaroptera	Camaroptera brevicaudata	Sub-Saharan Africa
	Hartert's camaroptera	Camaroptera harterti	Angola.
	Yellow-browed camaroptera	Camaroptera superciliaris	African tropical rainforest
	Olive-green camaroptera	Camaroptera chloronota	African tropical rainforest

Molecular phylogenetic studies have shown that the green-backed and the grey-backed camaroptera are closely related, and some taxonomists treat them as conspecific.
