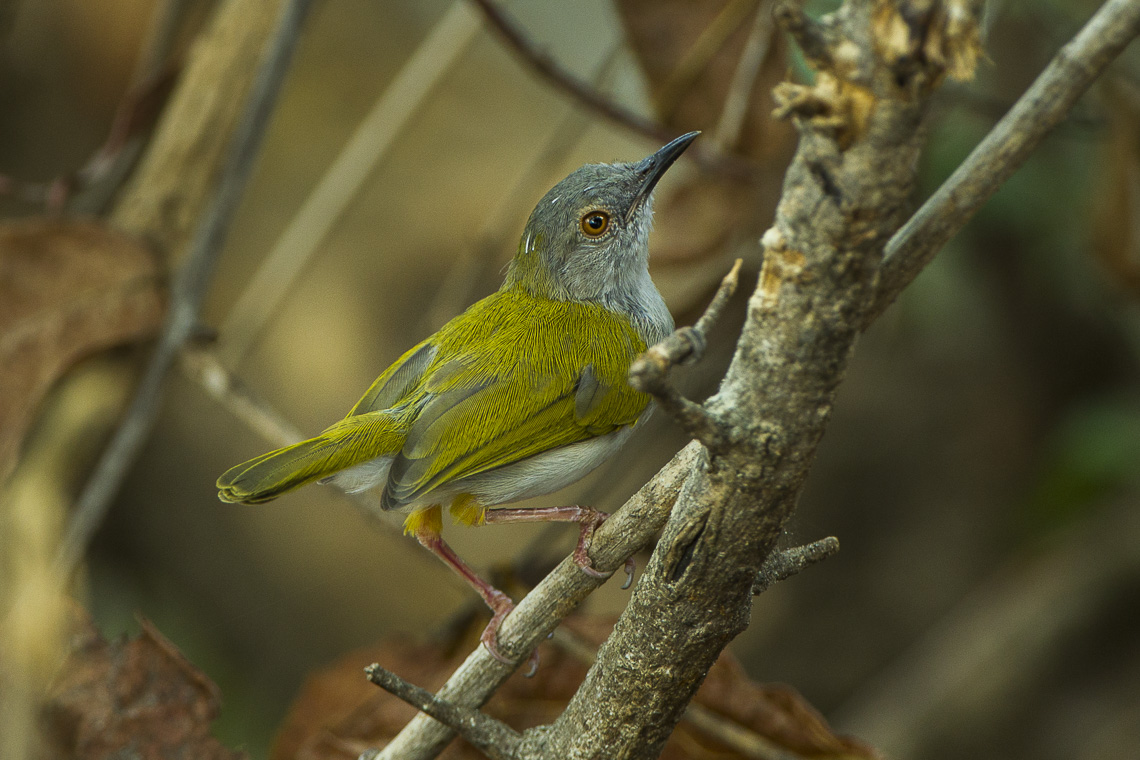
- Photographed in Malawi

Conservation status
- Least Concern (IUCN 3.1)

Scientific classification
- Kingdom: Animalia
- Phylum: Chordata
- Class: Aves
- Order: Passeriformes
- Family: Cisticolidae
- Genus: Camaroptera
- Species: C. brachyura

Binomial name
- Camaroptera brachyura (Vieillot, 1821)

Audio
- Song recorded in Cape Province, South Africa

= Green-backed camaroptera =

Species of bird

The green-backed camaroptera (Camaroptera brachyura), also known as the bleating camaroptera, is a small bird in the family Cisticolidae. This bird is a resident breeder in Africa south of the Sahara Desert. Recent studies suggest this species and the grey-backed camaroptera may be the same species.

This skulking passerine is typically found low in dense cover. The green-backed camaroptera binds large leaves together low in a bush and builds a grass nest within the leaves. The normal clutch is two or three eggs.

These 11.5 cm long warblers have green upperparts. The wings are olive and the underparts whitish grey. The sexes are similar, but juveniles are paler yellow on the breast.

Like most members in the group, green-backed camaroptera is insectivorous.

The green-backed camaroptera was described by the French ornithologist Louis Pierre Vieillot in 1821 under the binomial name Sylvia brachyura. The type locality is the Cape of Good Hope. The specific epithet brachyura is from the Ancient Greek brakhus for "short" and -ouros for "-tailed".

There are five subspecies:

- Camaroptera brachyura pileata Reichenow, 1891 – southeast Kenya to southeast Tanzania
- Camaroptera brachyura fugglescouchmani Moreau, 1939 – northeast Zambia, north Malawi and east Tanzania
- Camaroptera brachyura bororensis Gunning & Roberts, 1911 – south Tanzania, south Malawi and north Mozambique
- Camaroptera brachyura constans Clancey, 1952 – southeast Zimbabwe, south Mozambique and northeast South Africa
- Camaroptera brachyura brachyura (Vieillot, 1821) – south and east South Africa
