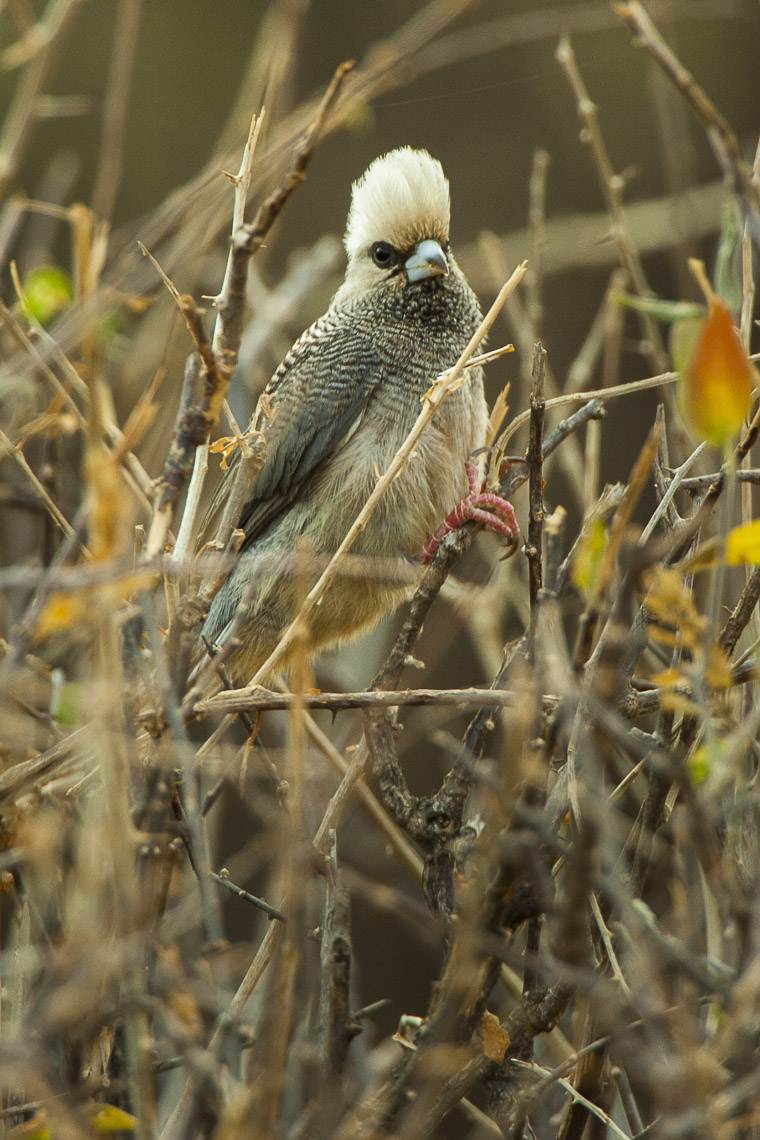

Conservation status
- Least Concern (IUCN 3.1)

Scientific classification
- Kingdom: Animalia
- Phylum: Chordata
- Class: Aves
- Order: Coliiformes
- Family: Coliidae
- Genus: Colius
- Species: C. leucocephalus

Binomial name
- Colius leucocephalus Reichenow, 1879

= White-headed mousebird =

Species of bird

The white-headed mousebird (Colius leucocephalus) is a bird belonging to the mousebird family, Coliidae. It is found only in east Africa where it occurs in southern Somalia and parts of Kenya with its range just extending into southern Ethiopia and northern Tanzania. It inhabits arid bushland up to 1,400 metres above sea-level.

It is 32 cm long with the long, graduated tail accounting for over half of this. The plumage is mainly greyish with black and white barring on the back, neck and breast. It has a white crest, crown and cheeks. There is a white stripe down the back which becomes visible when the bird flies. Around the eye is a patch of dark, bare skin. The bill is bluish-white above and buff below. In juvenile birds, the throat and breast are buff. The northern subspecies (C. l. turneri) is darker than the southern form (C. l. leucocephalus).

The contact call is a scratchy chattering and the bird also has a descending song.
