= Otto Eduard Graf von Zedlitz und Trützschler =

German ornithologist and zoologist (1873–1927)

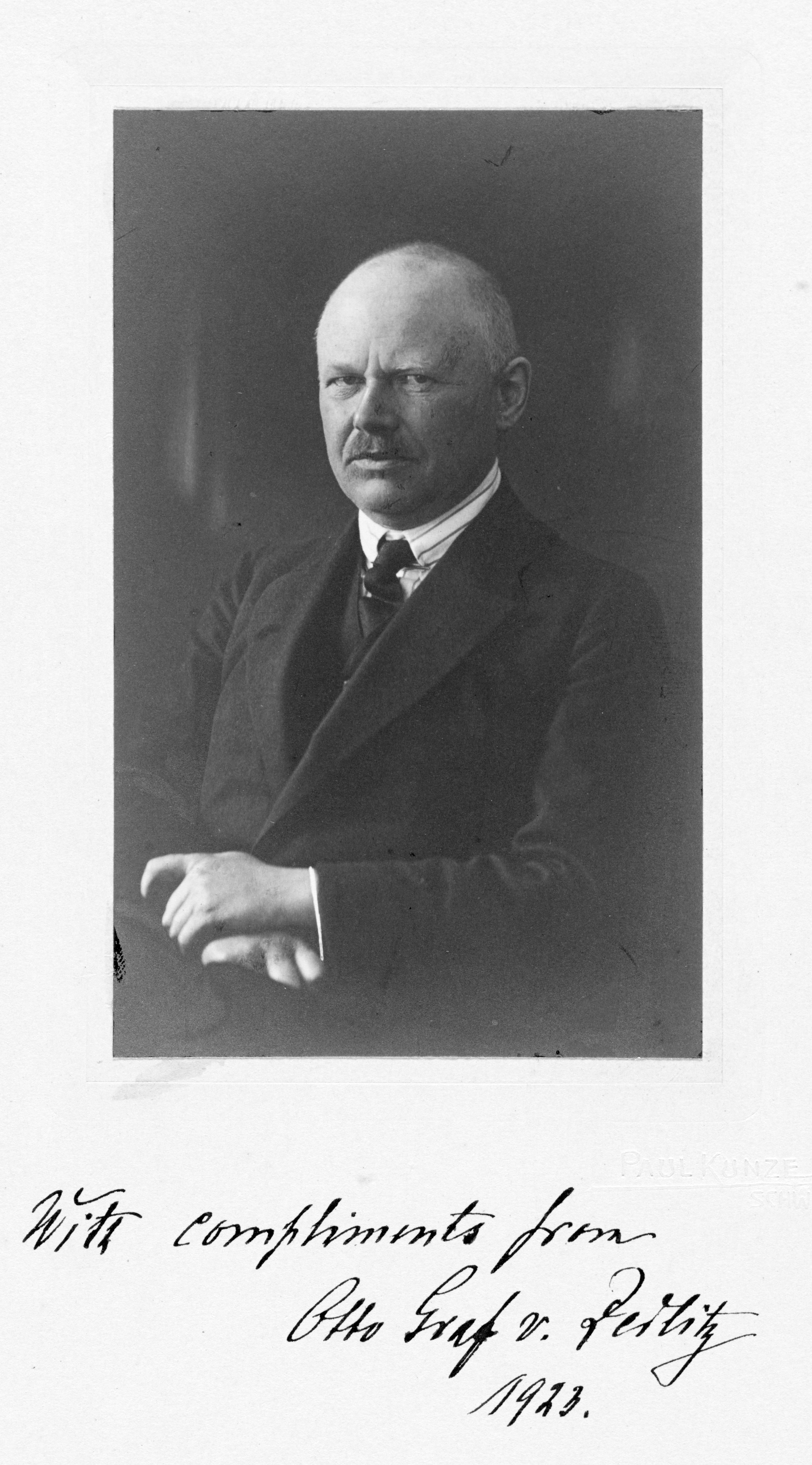
- Born: March 23, 1873
- Died: December 4, 1927 (aged 54); Varberg, Sweden
- Scientific career
- Fields: Ornithology

Count Otto Eduard von Zedlitz und Trützschler (23 March 1873 – 4 December 1927) was a German nobleman, naturalist, explorer and writer. He settled in to Tofhult, Sweden after World War I.

== Life ==
Von Zedlitz was born in Silesia at the family home in Schwentnig near Zobten. His parents were Karl Friedrich Wilhelm Constantin von Zedlitz-Trützschler (1833–1888) and Helene von Rohr (1839–1878). After the early death of his mother he was raised by an aunt in Altenburg. He was educated at Breslau.

He joined for military service (Leibkürassieren Regiment) following which he travelled around Spitzbergen and the Arctic circle with Arthur Berger and J. Roth around 1900.

He travelled to Tunisia with Paul W. H. Spatz (1865–1942) from 1904 to 1906, making large collections of birds. He made several more visits to Africa and again to the Arctic. In 1912 he met Lord Rothschild and Ernst Hartert in Algeria.

For some time towards the end of World War I, he was posted to the Eastern Front where he explored the Pripyat Marshes.

After the war, he moved to Sweden and settled in Tofhult in Kalv. His collections of more than 7000 skins was donated to the Stockholm Museum for which he received a Linnaeus Medal from the Royal Swedish Academy of Sciences.

Von Zedlitz described several bird taxa including Camaroptera harterti. Oscar Neumann named Bucanetes githagineus zedlitzi from one of his specimens after him in 1907. Anton Reichenow named Cisticola brachypterus zedlitzi after him. A couple of other taxa named after him are considered junior synonyms.

== Publications ==
Von Zedlitz wrote mainly in German and particularly in the Journal für Ornithologie. An incomplete list of publications includes:

- J. Roth, Arthur Berger, Otto Graf von Zedlitz (1902). Deutsches Weidwerk unter der Mitternachtssonne. Berlin: Paul Parey.
- Otto Graf von Zedlitz (1908). "Hat die im Winter niedergegangene Regenmenge einen Einfluß auf das Brutgeschäft einzelner Vögel im Chott-Gebiete südlich des Atlas?". Journal für Ornithologie. 56 (3): 480–487. doi:10.1007/BF02089364. S2CID 28605414.
- Otto Graf von Zedlitz (1909). "Ornithologische Beobachtungen aus Tunesien speziell dem Chott-Gebiete". Journal für Ornithologie. 57 (2): 121–211. doi:10.1007/BF02094816. S2CID 29702901.
- Otto Graf von Zedlitz (1909). "Ornithologische Beobachtungen aus Tunesien, speziell dem Chott-Gebiete". Journal für Ornithologie. 57 (3): 241–322. doi:10.1007/BF02096265. S2CID 36001610.
- Otto Graf von Zedlitz (1910). "Einige neue Formen aus Nordost-Afrika". Ornithologische Monatsberichte. 18 (1): 8–10.
- Otto Graf von Zedlitz (1910). "Einige neue Formen aus Nordost-Afrika". Ornithologische Monatsberichte. 18: 39–44.
- Otto Graf von Zedlitz (1910). "Meine Ornithologische Ausbeute Nordost-Afrikas". Journal für Ornithologie. 58 (2): 290–394. doi:10.1007/BF02090152. S2CID 45703902.
- Otto Graf von Zedlitz (1910). "Meine Ornithologische Ausbeute Nordost-Afrikas". Journal für Ornithologie. 58 (4): 731–807. doi:10.1007/BF02090346. S2CID 45763098.
- Otto Graf von Zedlitz (1911). "Meine ornithologische Ausbeute in Nordost-Afrika". Journal für Ornithologie. 59 (1): 1–92. doi:10.1007/BF02135098. S2CID 27854749.
- Otto Graf von Zedlitz (1911). "Ornithologische Notizen von der "Zeppelin-Studienfahrt" Spitzbergen Sommer 1910". Journal für Ornithologie. 59 (2, April): 300–327. doi:10.1007/BF02091056. S2CID 28196817.
- Otto Graf von Zedlitz (1911). "Revision des Genus Camaroptera". Journal für Ornithologie. 59 (2): 328–345. doi:10.1007/BF02091057. S2CID 36866277.
- Otto Graf von Zedlitz (1911). "Nachtrag zu "Meine ornithologische Ausbeute in Nordost-Afrika"". Journal für Ornithologie. 59 (2): 591–613.
- Otto Graf von Zedlitz (1912). "Von Suez zum Sankt Katharinen-Kloster - Ein ornithologischer Streifzug". Journal für Ornithologie. 60 (3): 325–329. doi:10.1007/BF02090180. S2CID 38701658.
- Otto Graf von Zedlitz (1912). "Von Suez zum Sankt Katharinen-Kloster - Ein ornithologischer Streifzug". Journal für Ornithologie. 60 (4): 529–569. doi:10.1007/BF02091747. S2CID 40216189.
- Otto Graf von Zedlitz (1913). "Ornithologische Ergebnisse der Reise von Paul Spatz in die algerische Sahara im Sommer 1912". Novitates Zoologicae. 20: 164–186.
- Otto Graf von Zedlitz (1914). "Ornithologische Reisebilder aus Nord-Algerien". Journal für Ornithologie. 62 (1): 110–134. doi:10.1007/BF02089375. S2CID 29306501.
- Otto Graf von Zedlitz (1914). "Zusammenstellung der im April – Juni 1913 in Algerien von mir gemachten nidologischen Beobachtungen". Journal für Ornithologie. 62 (1): 134–148. doi:10.1007/BF02089376. S2CID 26599369.
- Otto Graf von Zedlitz (1914). "Das Süd-Somaliland als zoogeographisches Gebiet". Journal für Ornithologie. 62 (4): 608–678. doi:10.1007/BF02431268. S2CID 9782336.
- Otto Graf von Zedlitz (1915). "Notizen über die Städtische Vogelsammlung in Kielce". Ornithologische Monatsberichte. 23: 161–167.
- Otto Graf von Zedlitz (1916). "Das Süd-Somaliland als zoogeographisches Gebiet". Journal für Ornithologie. 64 (1): 1–119. doi:10.1007/BF02250363. S2CID 36424707.
- Otto Graf von Zedlitz (1917). "Liste der im Gebiete der Schara beobachteten Vögel". Journal für Ornithologie. 65 (2): 278–308. doi:10.1007/BF02327962. S2CID 13201945.
- Otto Graf von Zedlitz (1918). "Der Einfluß des russischen Winters auf die Vogelwelt". Journal of Ornithology. 66 (4): 409–420. doi:10.1007/BF02251732. S2CID 41384597.
- Otto Graf von Zedlitz (1918). "Beobachtungen an Rabenvögeln im westlichen Rußland". Ornithologische Monatsberichte. 26 (3/4): 33–39.
- Otto Graf von Zedlitz (1918). "Beobachtungen an Rabenvögeln im westlichen Rußland". Ornithologische Monatsberichte. 26 (5/6): 63–67.
- Otto Graf von Zedlitz (1919). "Über das Vorkommen von Kormoran, Schnatterente und Limose auf den Militscher Teichen". Journal für Ornithologie. 67 (4): 118–123. doi:10.1007/BF02538367. S2CID 6246989.
- Otto Graf von Zedlitz (1919). "Über die Formen von Turdus musicus". Journal für Ornithologie. 67 (4): 485–490. doi:10.1007/BF02539471. S2CID 45481473.
- Otto Graf von Zedlitz (1920). "Die im Pripjet-Sumpf und den benachbarten Gebieten festgestellten Vogelarten". Journal für Ornithologie. 68 (2): 188–235. doi:10.1007/BF02537581. S2CID 32877823.
- Otto Graf von Zedlitz (1920). "Die Avifauna des westlichen Pripjet-Sumpfes im Lichte der Forschung deutscher Ornithologen in den Jahren 1915–1918". Journal für Ornithologie. 68 (3–4): 350–388. doi:10.1007/BF02537893. S2CID 10278738.
- Otto Graf von Zedlitz (1921). "Die Avifauna des westlichen Pripjet-Sumpfes im Lichte der Forschung deutscher Ornithologen in den Jahren 1915–1918". Journal für Ornithologie. 69 (3): 269–399. doi:10.1007/BF02537526. S2CID 19384550.
- Otto Graf von Zedlitz (1922). "Ein Beitrag zur Biologie von Colymbus arcticus L." Journal für Ornithologie. 70 (4): 419–423. doi:10.1007/BF02538206. S2CID 41788406.
- Otto Graf von Zedlitz (1924). Dauerehen bei Vögeln. Neisse: F. Bär.
- Otto Graf von Zedlitz (1925). "Rezente Verschiebungen in der Avifauna Schwedens". Journal für Ornithologie. 73 (3): 395–417. doi:10.1007/BF01906398. S2CID 45697875.
- Otto Graf von Zedlitz (1926). "Vogelwichte als Hilfsmittel für die biologische Forschung". Journal für Ornithologie. 74: 296–303. doi:10.1007/BF01949644. S2CID 30556577.
