= Coly (disambiguation) =

Coly is a village in the Dordogne department, in France.

Coly may also refer to:

- Mousebird, a group of birds
- Ferdinand Coly (born 1973), Senegalese footballer
- Matar Coly (born 1984), Senegalese footballer
- River Coly, a river in the county of Devon, England
- Tim Coly, German rugby union player
