= Oligocolius =

Oligocolius Temporal range: Early–Late Oligocene Rupelian

Scientific classification
- Kingdom: Animalia
- Phylum: Chordata
- Class: Aves
- Clade: Coraciimorphae
- Order: Coliiformes
- Family: Coliidae
- Genus: †Oligocolius; Mayr, 2000

Type species
- †Oligocolius brevitarsus Mayr, 2000

Species
- †O. brevitarsus Mayr, 2000; †O. psittacocephalon Mayr, 2013

Genus of fossil mousebird

Oligocolius (meaning "Oligocene mousebird") is an unusual genus of extinct mousebird from the early to late Oligocene epoch of Germany. Oligocolius is known from two species, the type species O. brevitarsus and O. psittacocephalon. Oligocolius is a member of the family of modern mousebirds (Coliidae) and is broadly similar to them in shape. However, unlike modern mouse birds the skull and beak of Oligocolius closely resembles those of parrots, and appears to be specialised for a distinct lifestyle not found in living mousebirds.

== Discovery ==
The first specimen of Oligocolius was discovered in a clay pit at Frauenweiler, near Wiesloch in Germany, dated to the Rupelian approximately 32 million years ago during the early Oligocene from which its name derives. The specimen was described and named by palaeontologist Gerald Mayr in 2000, included much of the skeleton, but was disarticulated and missing its skull, as well as most of both its left wing and foot. The species was named O. brevitarsus for the unusually short length of its foot (from Latin brevis, short).

A second specimen was later described by Mayr in 2013 from the late Oligocene (24.7 Ma) lagerstätte in Enspel (an ancient maar lake) near Bad Marienberg, Germany. Compared to the first specimen, this specimen was nearly complete (missing only the pygostyle of the tail) and was fully articulated. Although referable to Oligocolius, the two specimens could be distinguished by differing limb proportions, and so the new specimen was assigned its own species, O. psittacocephalon. The species was named for the distinctive parrot-like skull present in the specimen (from the Greek psittakos and cephalon).

Oligocolius is the only coliid known from the Oligocene and is the most complete Paleogene coliid known, however, it is more unlike modern mousebirds than some older Eocene forms (such as Primocolius and Palaeospiza). Oligocolius demonstrates then that fossil coliids occupied a much more diverse range of lifestyles than those represented today.

== Description ==
Oligocolius was similar in size to living mousebirds (such as the speckled mousebird) with a superficially similar shape, as well as derived traits of the skeleton that ally it closely with living coliids. Like living mousebirds, it had a short, rounded skull with a short beak, short legs and presumably pamprodactyl feet. However, it is noticeably distinct in both the design of its skull and the proportions of its limbs.

The skull of Oligocolius is remarkably parrot-like, particularly due to the broad intertemporal region between the eyes and the shape of the beak. The upper beak is deep and rounded, as well as possibly hooked at the tip, compared to the short finch-like beaks of modern mousebirds. The mandible has a particularly long retroarticular process, where the muscle for opening the jaws attaches to at the back of the lower jaw. The length of this bone would have provided Oligocolius with an increased gape compared to modern mousebirds. Furthermore, the beak is attached to the cranium by a hinge between the nasal bones and the frontals, meaning the upper beak was freely mobile like those of parrots and toucans. However, the combination of the long retroarticular process and the nasofrontal hinge is only found in parrots and Oligocolius, suggesting they share a similar degree of cranial kinesis.

In addition to the parrot-like skull, Oligocolius also has notably shorter feet and longer wings than modern mousebirds. Particularly, the ulna and carpometacarpus of the hand are distinctly longer than those of modern mousebirds. The tarsometatarsus of the foot is much shorter than in any other known coliiform, much shorter than the humerus and ulna and only slightly longer than the carpometacarpus. The phalanx bones of the toes are shortened as in modern mousebirds, but uniquely the first phalanges of the forward pointing toes are all equally shortened. The fourth toe was capable of reversing as in modern mousebirds, and it was presumably pamprodactyl. It is unknown if Oligocolius had the characteristic long tail feathers of other mousebirds, however O. brevitarsus has a very well-developed pygostyle to suggest so.

== Palaeobiology ==
O. psittacocephalon was found with many fruit stones inside its body, mostly in a cluster beneath the skull and a few within the body cavity. The size of the stones are about as large as the biggest fruits swallowed by living mousebirds (0.5 mm) and are completely intact, indicating that Oligocolius not only consumed larger fruits than living mousebirds but that it also swallowed them whole. The flexibility of the short upper beak was likely a specialisation for eating such large food items, as it is in modern parrots.

The presence of a crop in Oligocolius implies that it was feeding on fruits and vegetation that was tougher to digest than those in the diet of living mousebirds. Because the crop is absent in living mousebirds, and that mousebirds are not closely related to other birds with crops (such as the hoatzin and raptors), it is inferred that the crop was evolved independently in at least Oligocolius amongst mousebirds.

The longer and more strongly developed wings of Oligocolius would have allowed it to fly for longer distances than living mousebirds, while the shorter feet imply it was less competent on the ground than modern mousebirds. Oligocolius likely spent more time in the trees than living mousebirds, and was capable of dispersing more easily than other coliids. It's possible that unusual adaptations of Oligocolius were a response to a period of cooling climate in Europe between the Paleocene-Eocene Thermal Maximum and the Miocene Climatic Optimum, although this is uncertain.
