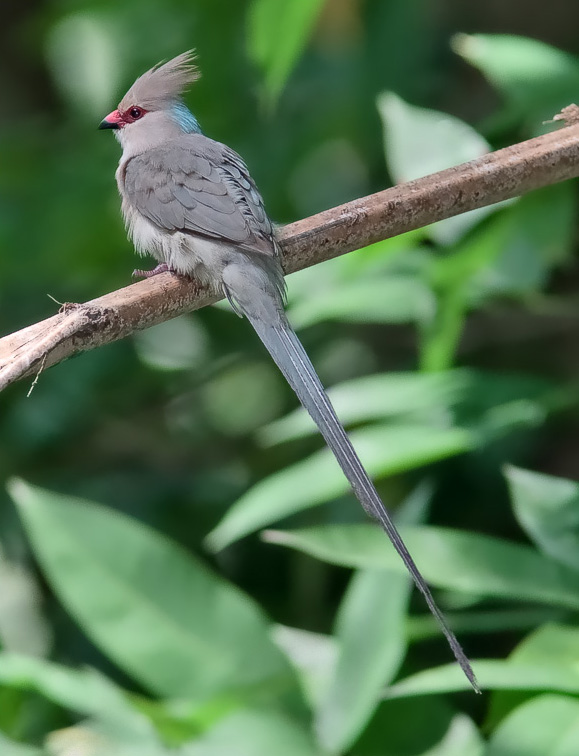

Conservation status
- Least Concern (IUCN 3.1)

Scientific classification
- Kingdom: Animalia
- Phylum: Chordata
- Class: Aves
- Order: Coliiformes
- Family: Coliidae
- Genus: Urocolius
- Species: U. macrourus

Binomial name
- Urocolius macrourus (Linnaeus, 1766)

Synonyms
- Lanius macrourus Linnaeus, 1766; Colius macrourus

= Blue-naped mousebird =

Species of bird

The blue-naped mousebird (Urocolius macrourus), also formerly called the blue-naped coly (Colius macrourus) is a species of bird belonging to the family Coliidae within the order Coliiformes. They are the sister group to the clade Eucavitaves, which contains the families Leptosomiformes (the cuckoo roller), Trogoniformes (trogons), Bucerotiformes (hornbills and hoopoes), Piciformes (woodpeckers, toucans, and barbets) and Coraciiformes (kingfishers, bee-eaters, rollers, motmots, and todies).

The species is found in the wild in the drier regions of West Africa to East Africa, as well as Sahel. It is one of the remaining six species of mousebirds. The term "mousebird" comes from its habit of running along branches in a way that resembles the scurrying of a mouse.

== Taxonomy ==
There are a total of six recognized subspecies:

1. Urocolius macrourus macrourus (Distribution: Senegambia to east Ethiopia)
2. Urocolius macrourus syntactus (Distribution: Sahel from Mali, southern Niger, and northern Nigeria east to Sudan, Eritrea, and northern Ethiopia)
3. Urocolius macrourus laeneni (Distribution: Aïr Massif, in NC Niger.)
4. Urocolius macrourus pulcher (Distribution: extreme South East South Sudan, Eastern Uganda, Kenya, extreme South Ethiopia, Southern Somalia and Northern Tanzania.)
5. Urocolius macrourus abyssinicus (Distribution: Central and Southern Ethiopia, and Northern Somalia South to about Beledweyne.)
6. Urocolius macrourus griseogularis (Distribution: South Sudan, Eastern Democratic Republic of Congo, Western Uganda, Rwanda, Burundi, and North Western and South Western Tanzania; this race sometimes said to occur in South Western Ethiopia.)

== Description ==
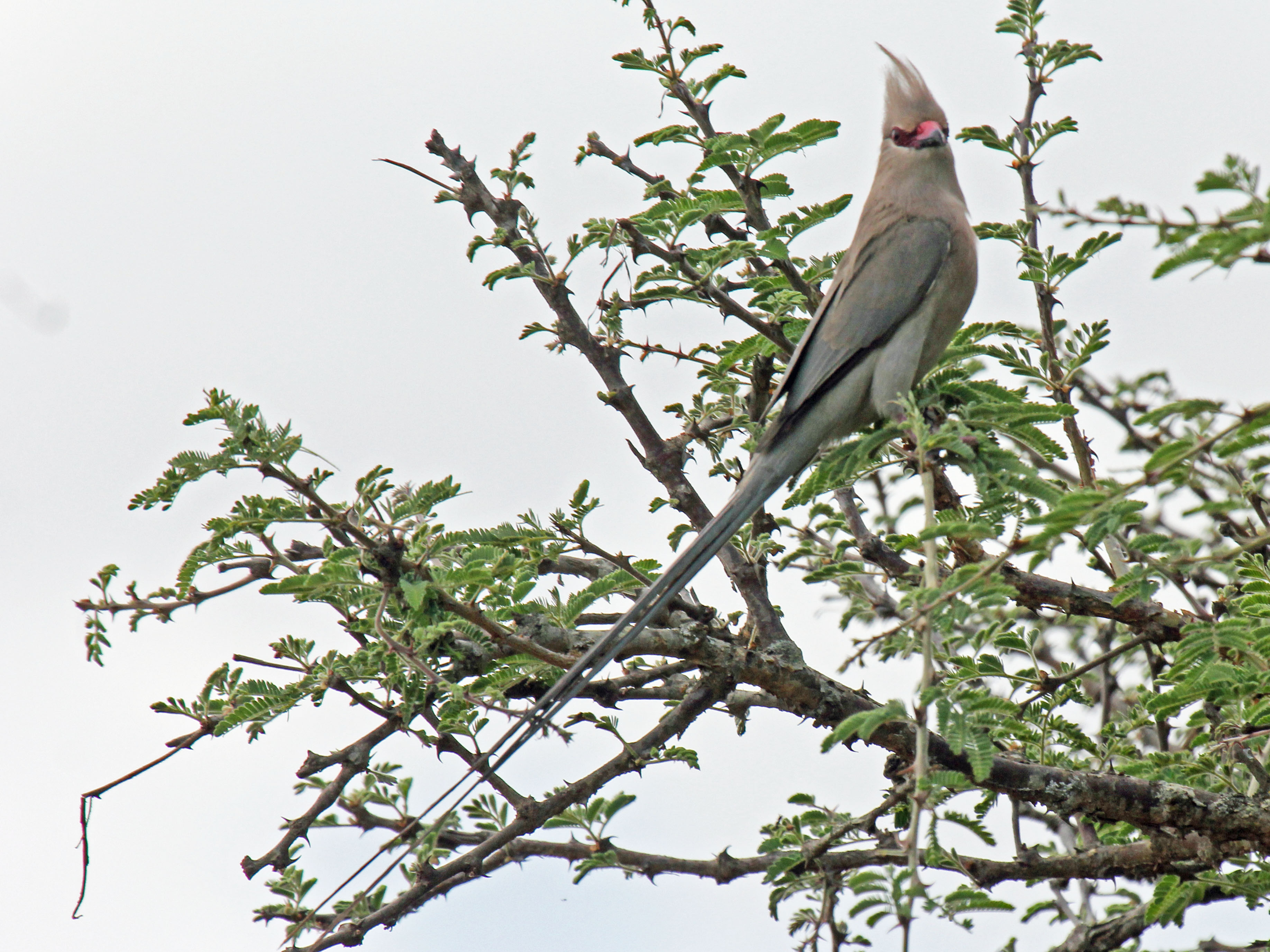
Blue-naped mousebird perched

The blue-naped mousebird is a fairly small to medium-sized bird, measuring 33–38 cm (13–15 in) in length including the elongated tail of 20–28 cm (7.9–11.0 in), weighing 34–65 g (1.2–2.3 oz). Adults have an ash grey plumage which is darker at top and lighter at bottom. Has a bright turquoise-blue patch on nape and hindneck, long crest, slender and steeply graduated tail, females shorter than males. Both sexes are brown-tinged ash-grey above, greyish-buff below; bare skin on lores and around eyes crimson-red; most of upper mandible crimson-red, rest of bill black; feet purplish red. Juveniles lack the blue on nape, and have pink facial skin and greenish bills, as well as shorter crest.

Characteristic of mousebirds, the blue-naped mousebird has widely spaced and large feet for its body size, which are pamprodactylous; they are able to rotate all four toes to face forward at will. Their toes are strong and dextrous, allowing the birds to climb and scurry along branches, to hang by a toenail, or to use one foot to hold food.

== Distribution and habitat ==
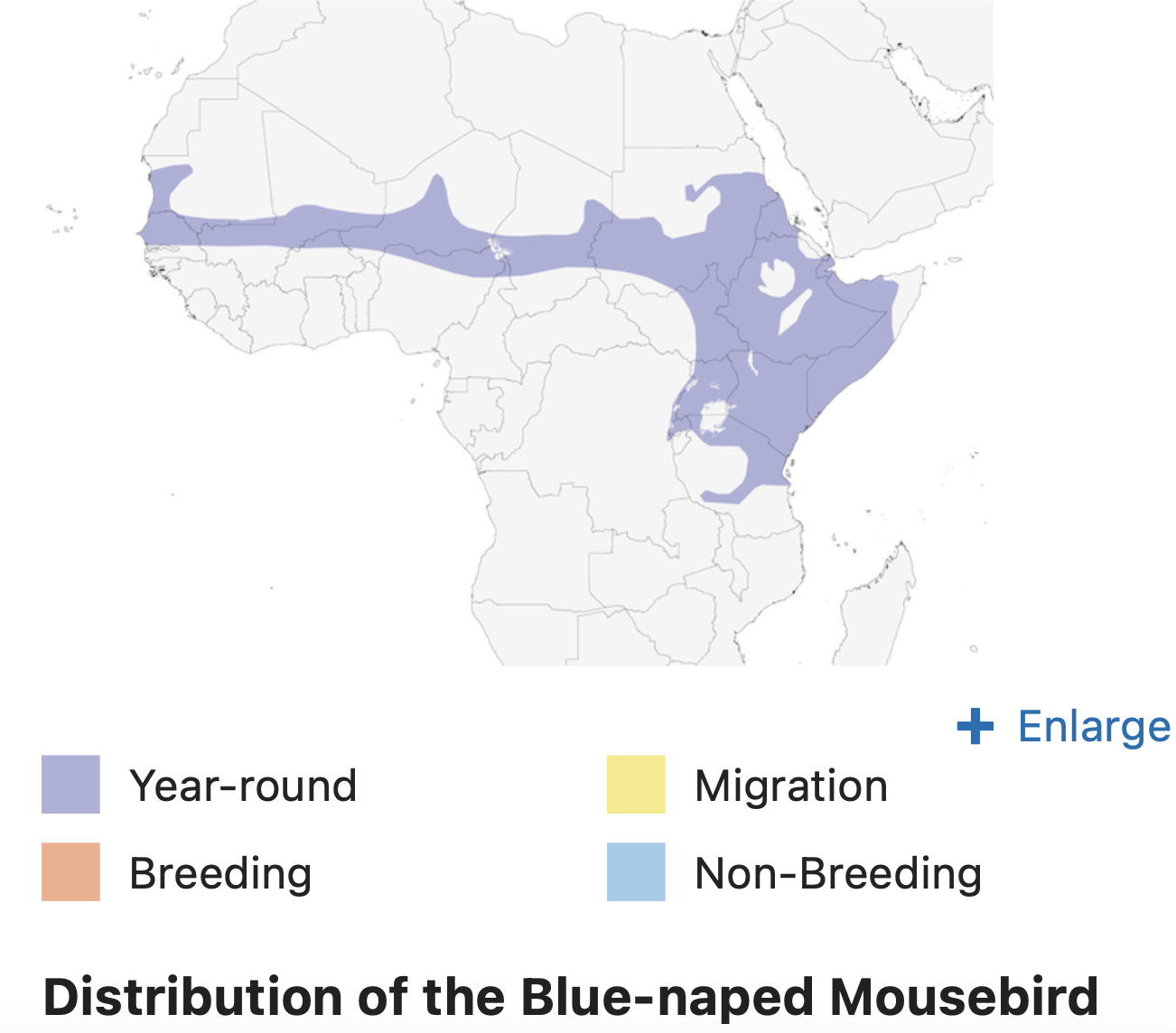
Distribution Map of Blue-naped Mousebird

In the wild, these birds live in the semi-desert and dry regions of Africa. In East Africa are found in a band between 10°N and 20°N from the western coast to Sudan, Djibouti, Eritrea, Ethiopia and Somalia in the East and south 10°N through East Africa and on to the Eastern Zaire borders. This species has an extremely large range, and hence does not approach the thresholds for Vulnerable under the range size criterion (Extent of Occurrence <20,000 km^{2} (7,700 sq mi) combined with a declining or fluctuating range size, habitat extent/quality, or population size and a small number of locations or severe fragmentation).

== Conservation status ==
Despite the fact that the population trend appears to be decreasing, the decline is not believed to be sufficiently rapid to approach the thresholds for Vulnerable under the population trend criterion (>30% decline over ten years or three generations). The population size has not been quantified, but it is not believed to approach the thresholds for Vulnerable under the population size criterion (<10,000 mature individuals with a continuing decline estimated to be >10% in ten years or three generations, or with a specified population structure). For these reasons the species is evaluated as least concern.

== Behaviour ==
=== Vocalizations ===
Solitary birds perched atop trees emit a distinct and resonant "tieee" whistle every 3–5 seconds. While foraging, it produces a shorter and less robust version of the same call, spaced at longer intervals of 10–15 seconds. In groups, a pre-flight ritual includes a collective "trie-trie" before departing the feeding area, or a rhythmic "tsie-tsie..." every 0.5 seconds just prior to takeoff. In flight, the sound transforms into variations like "trui-tru-tri", "triu-triu", or "tri-truu-truu...". A begging female vocalizes a unique sequence, described as "cruir-uu-tuit-truit", during courtship while the male utters a series of "tiuee-tuiee..." notes at a rate of six every approximately 10 seconds. Perched birds contribute to the auditory landscape with occasional weak trills and individual notes.

=== Movement ===
The birds are mostly sedentary, with occasional local nomadic behavior. Particularly in Senegal, Mali, Kenya, and Tanzania, routine dry-season movements occur, where they transition from savanna woodland to river valleys and populated areas. Infrequent sightings of the species in Benin, Gambia, and Guinea-Bissau are likely the outcomes of these movements.

=== Diet ===
Primarily, these birds rely on fruits as their main food source, and they also eat leaves, flowers, and buds. Bird have been seen foraging for food together, one of the few common arboreal bird species to do so In some regions like Niger and Chad, the berries of the Salvadora persica plant are especially crucial. Other plants they utilize include Balaenites aegyptiaca, Capparis decidua, Boscia senegalensis, Grewia villosa, Tamarindus, and Ficus. Additionally, they consume dates and various cultivated fruits, with a preference for those from the Azadirachta indica tree, commonly found in towns.

These birds are often seen in groups of up to ten individuals, but sometimes as many as 50 may gather around a single fruiting tree. They move in flocks, traveling from one known fruiting tree to another, stopping to forage every 20–200 meters (usually around 85 meters). They follow the same route at the same time each day.

=== Breeding ===
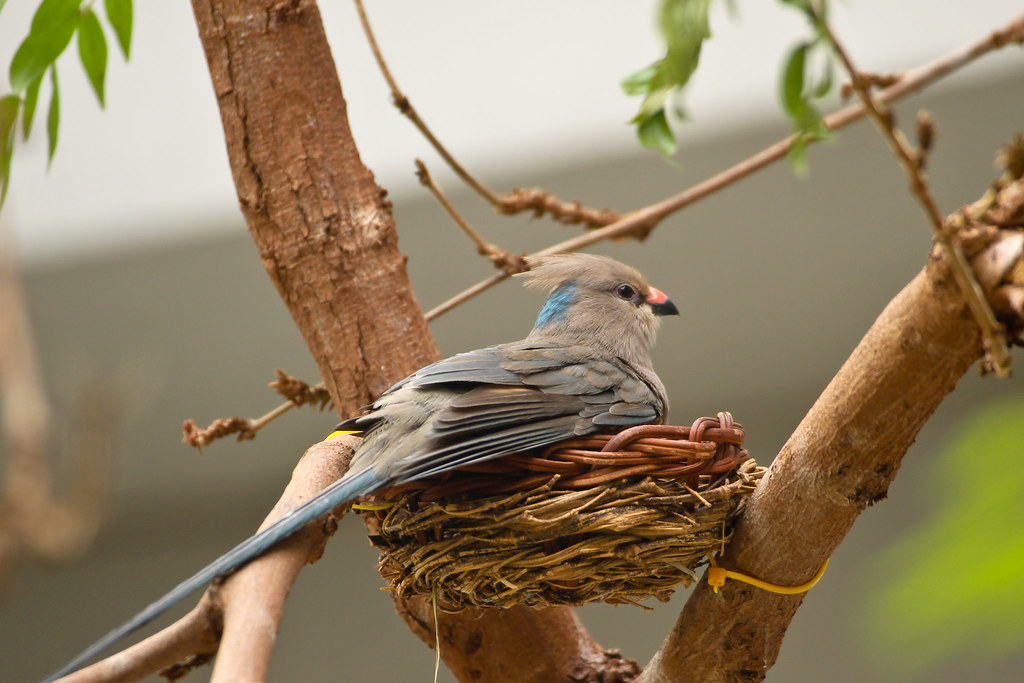
Nest of blue-naped mousebird

Breeding occurs throughout the year and peak season varies based on the region and is typically during or just after the rainy seasons: May-Jun in Nigeria, May-Jun and Dec- Feb in Northern Sudan, Apr-Jul in Ethiopia, May in Kenya, and Mar-Jun in Zaire. They have been observed to display monogamous tendencies in captivity where pair-bonds endure for extended periods, and are likely territorial in nature, but perhaps a co-operative breeder. The nest is a shallow and disorderly cup made of twigs, sparsely lined with grass and rootlets. Material is brought by the male and assembled by the female. It is typically positioned in a tree or thorny bush, approximately 3–4.5 meters above the ground. The usual clutch consists of 2–3 eggs (though occasionally 1–4), with whitish shells adorned with rufous or brown markings, measuring around 20.3 mm × 14.5 mm. Incubation begins with the first egg and is a joint effort by both sexes, with the female taking over during the night and the male during the day.

==== Life stages ====
The incubation stage observed in captivity spans 11 days. The chick once hatched, weighs around 2.3 grams, and exhibits distinctive bulbous swellings at the base and on both sides of the lower mandible, which persist for approximately one month and before it disappears. The chicks may venture out of the nest around 10–12 days when they have attained 55% of adult mass. Their inaugural flight occurs around 16–17 days, but they still return to the nest until they are 21 days of old. They are dependent on adults for sustenance for about six more weeks before they only attain adult body mass around 15 weeks of age. Longevity in captivity has been up to 11 year and five months.

== Gallery ==
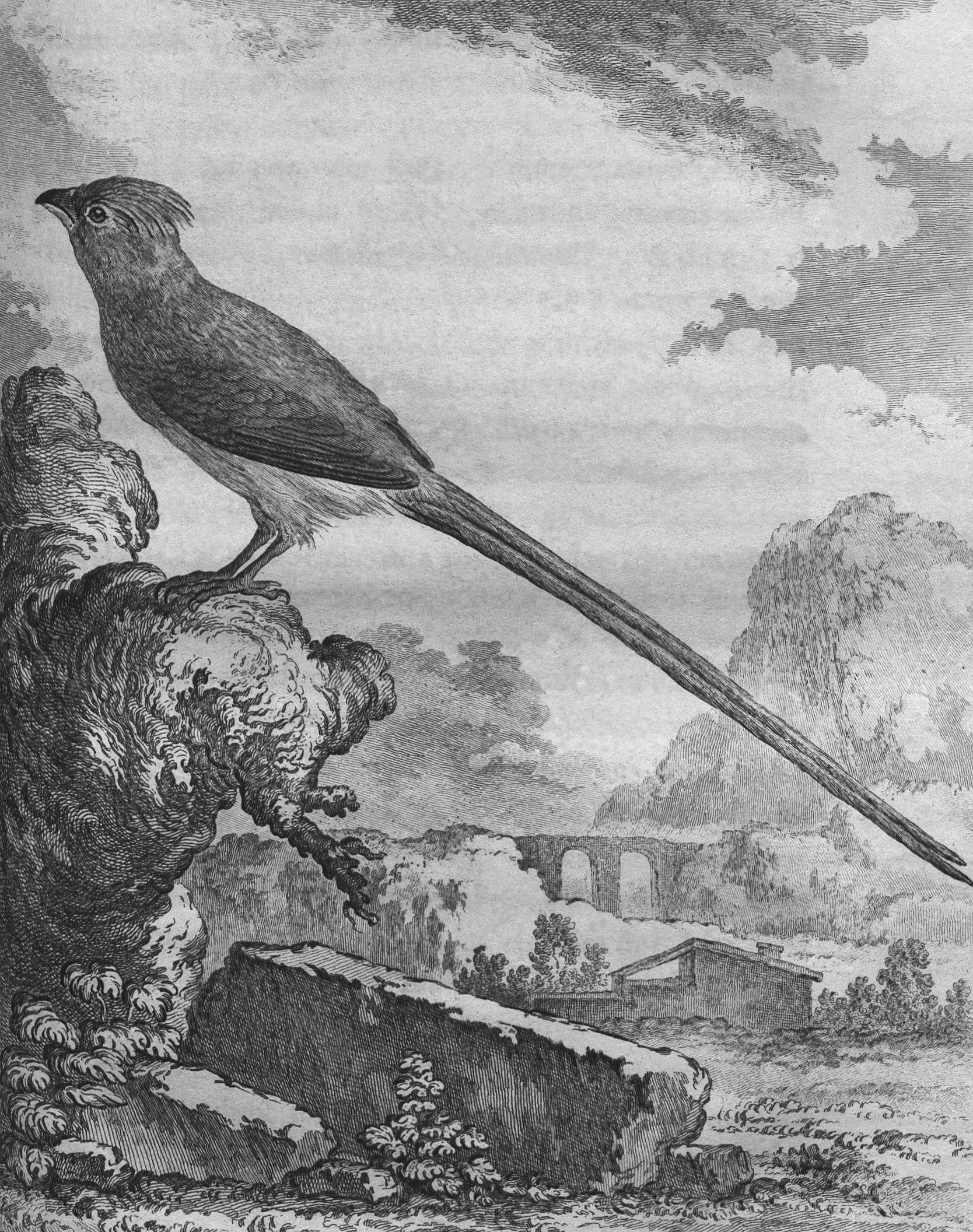

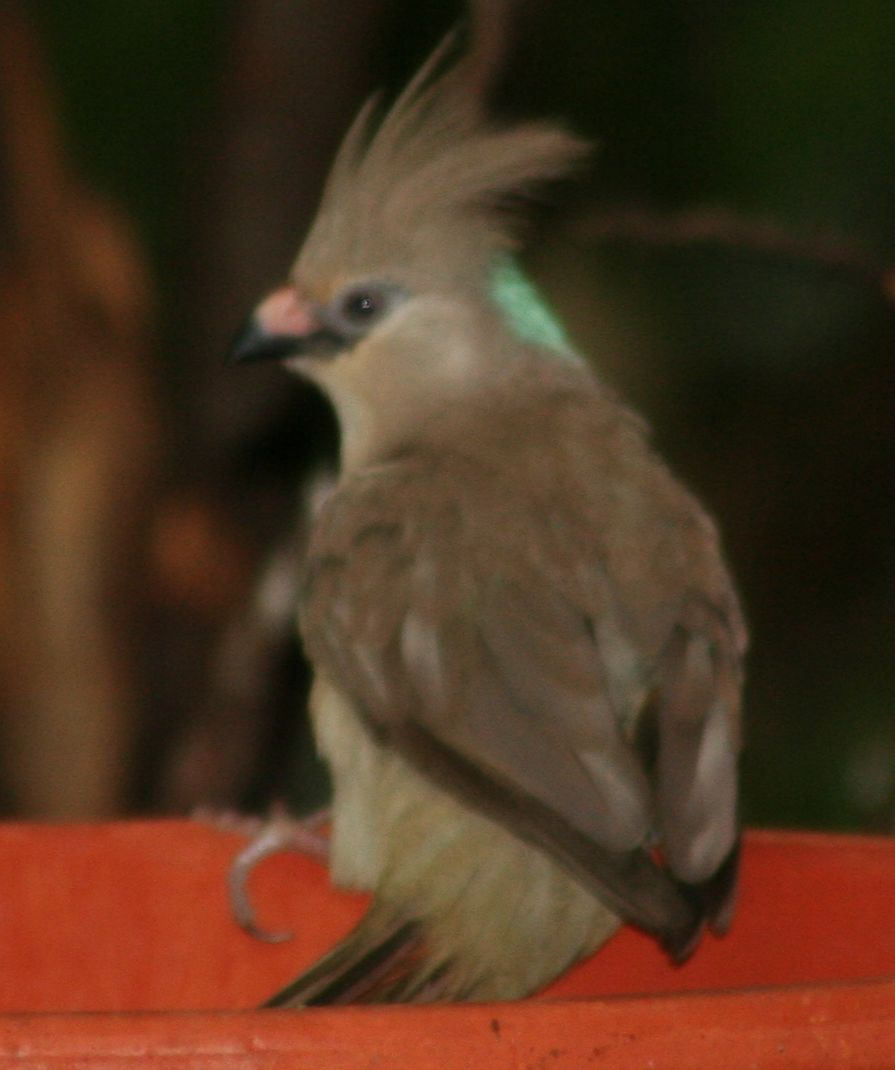

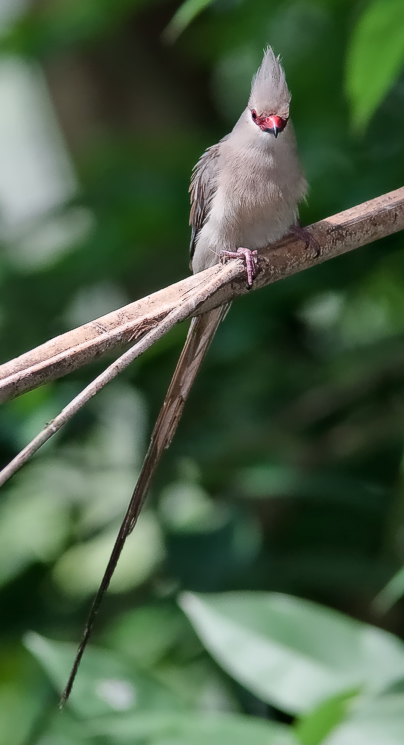

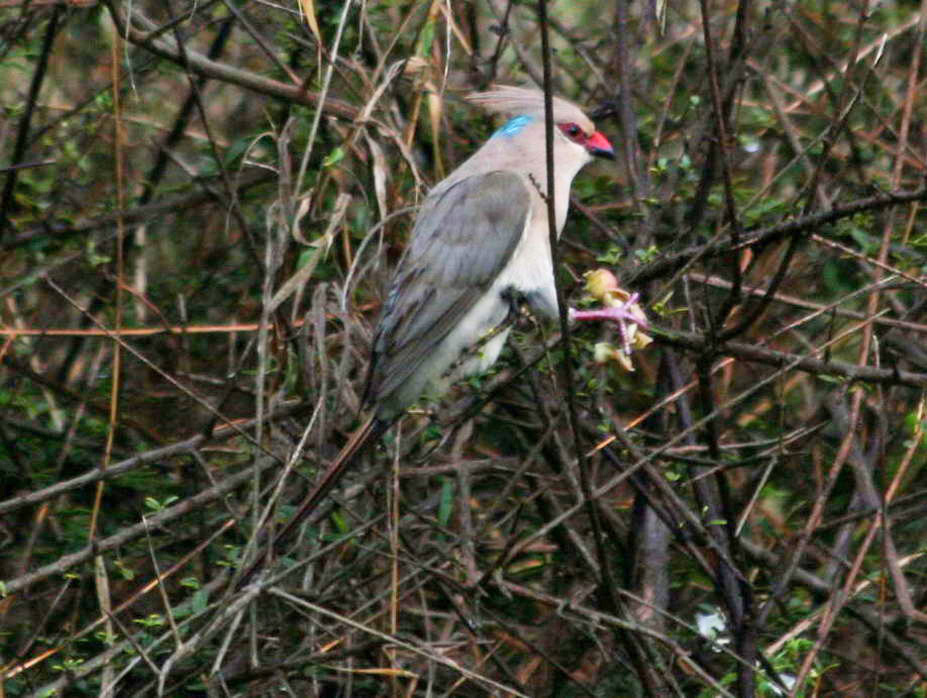

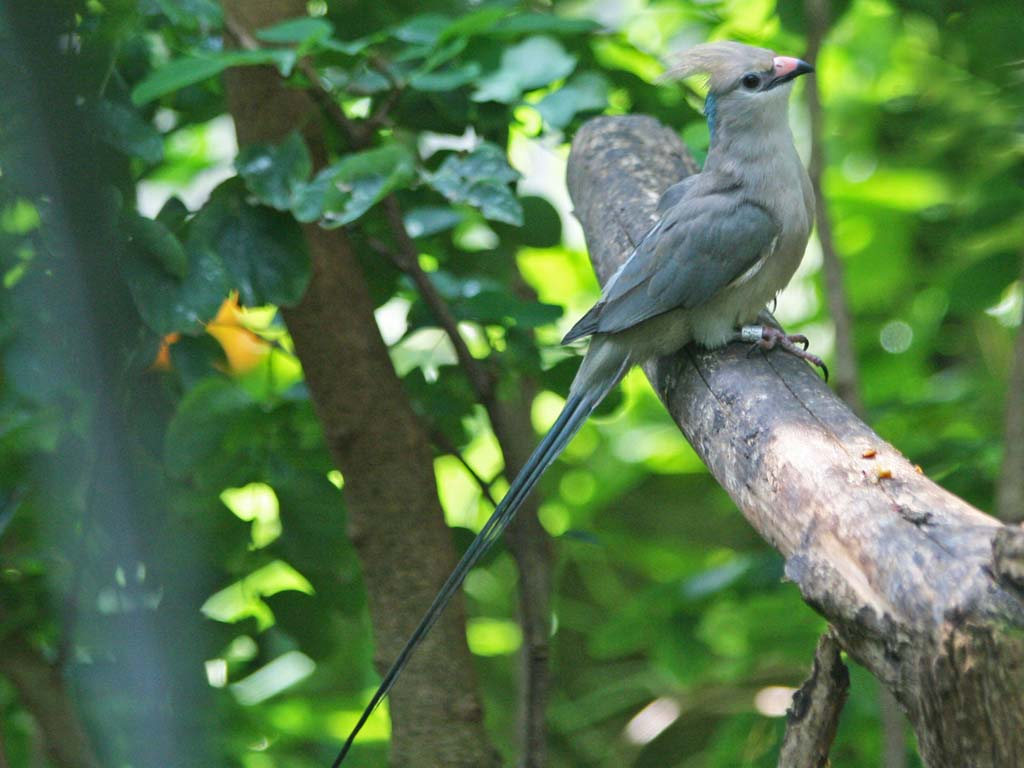

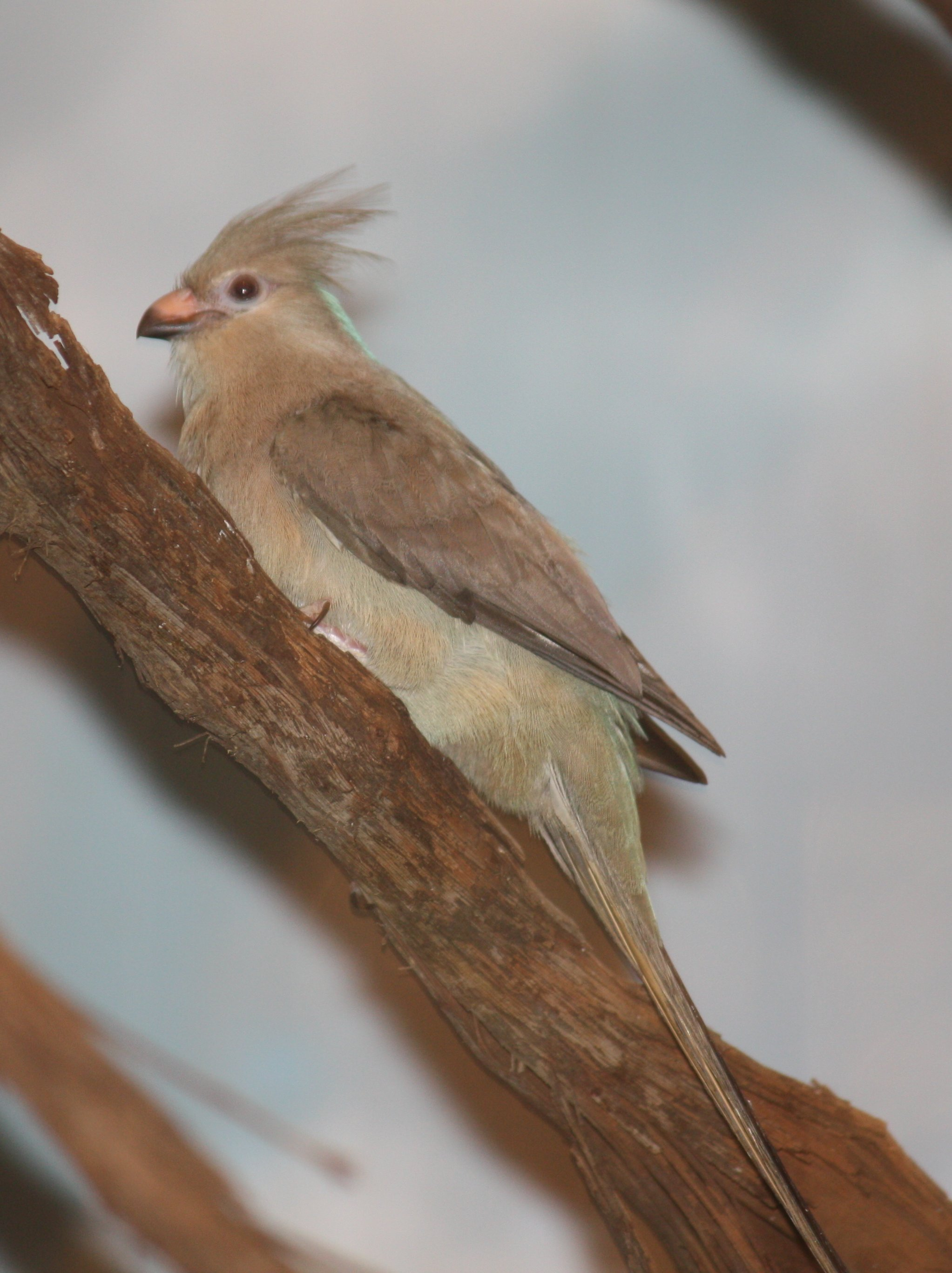

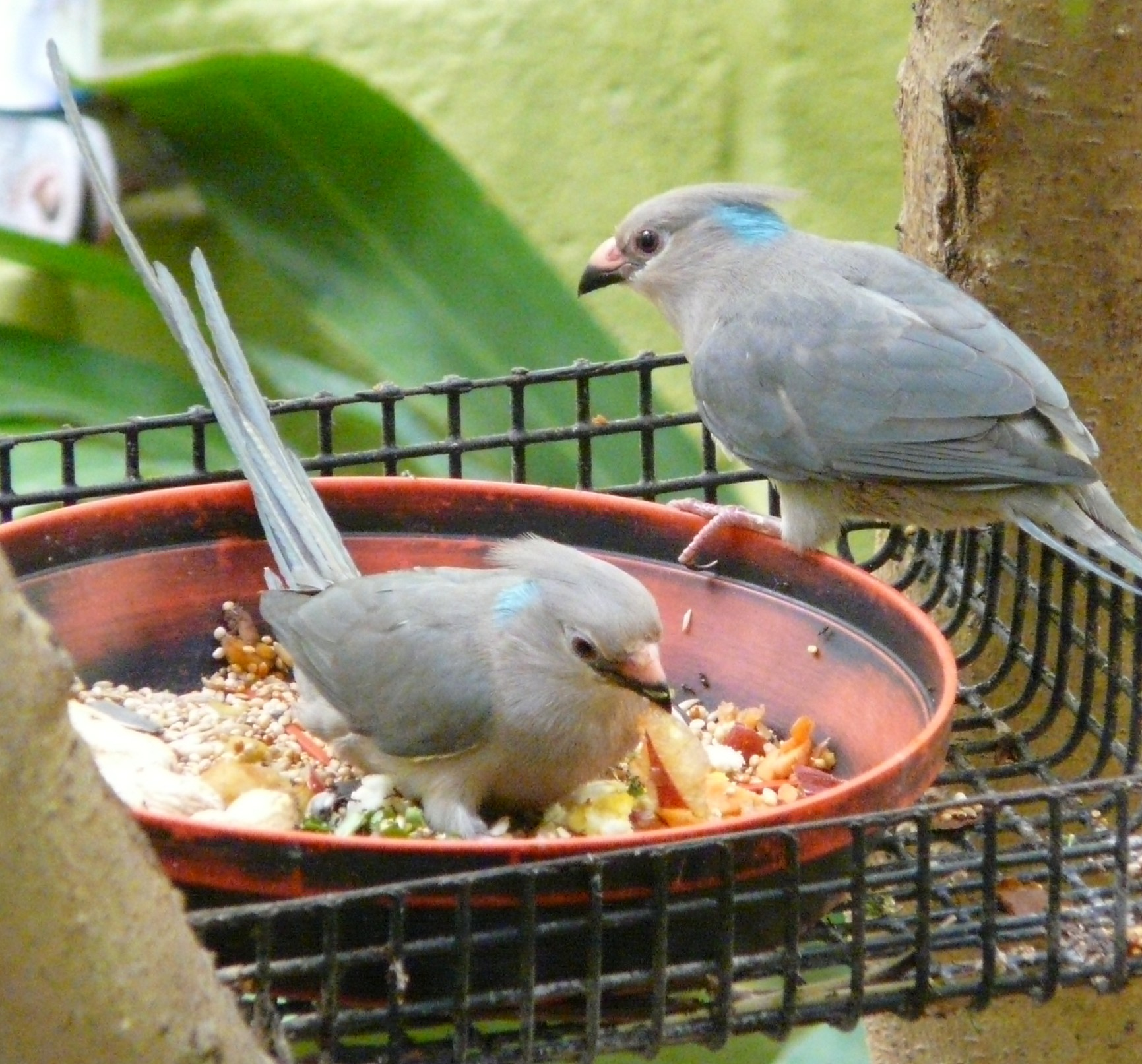
