= Tsidiiyazhi =

Tsidiiyazhi Temporal range: 62.5–62.2 Ma

Scientific classification
- Kingdom: Animalia
- Phylum: Chordata
- Class: Aves
- Clade: Coraciimorphae
- Order: Coliiformes
- Family: †Sandcoleidae
- Genus: †Tsidiiyazhi; Ksepka et al., 2017

Species
- †Tsidiiyazhi abini Ksepka et al., 2017

Genus of fossil mousebird

Tsidiiyazhi abini (Navajo: little morning bird) is an extinct relative of the modern mousebirds, found in 2017 in the Nacimiento Formation on ancestral Navajo lands in New Mexico. It is the only species in the genus Tsidiiyazhi. It lived between 62.2 and 62.5 million years ago, making it one of the oldest Cenozoic birds yet described.

== Description ==
T. abini is nearly identical in skeletal dimensions to the modern speckled mousebird, which is about 35 cm (14 in) long (half of that tail) and weighs around 50 grams (1.8 oz). Its feet were semi-zygodactyl, with some features of the toe bones that resemble those of owls. Its skull has not been found.
