= Coly-Saint-Amand =

- Commune
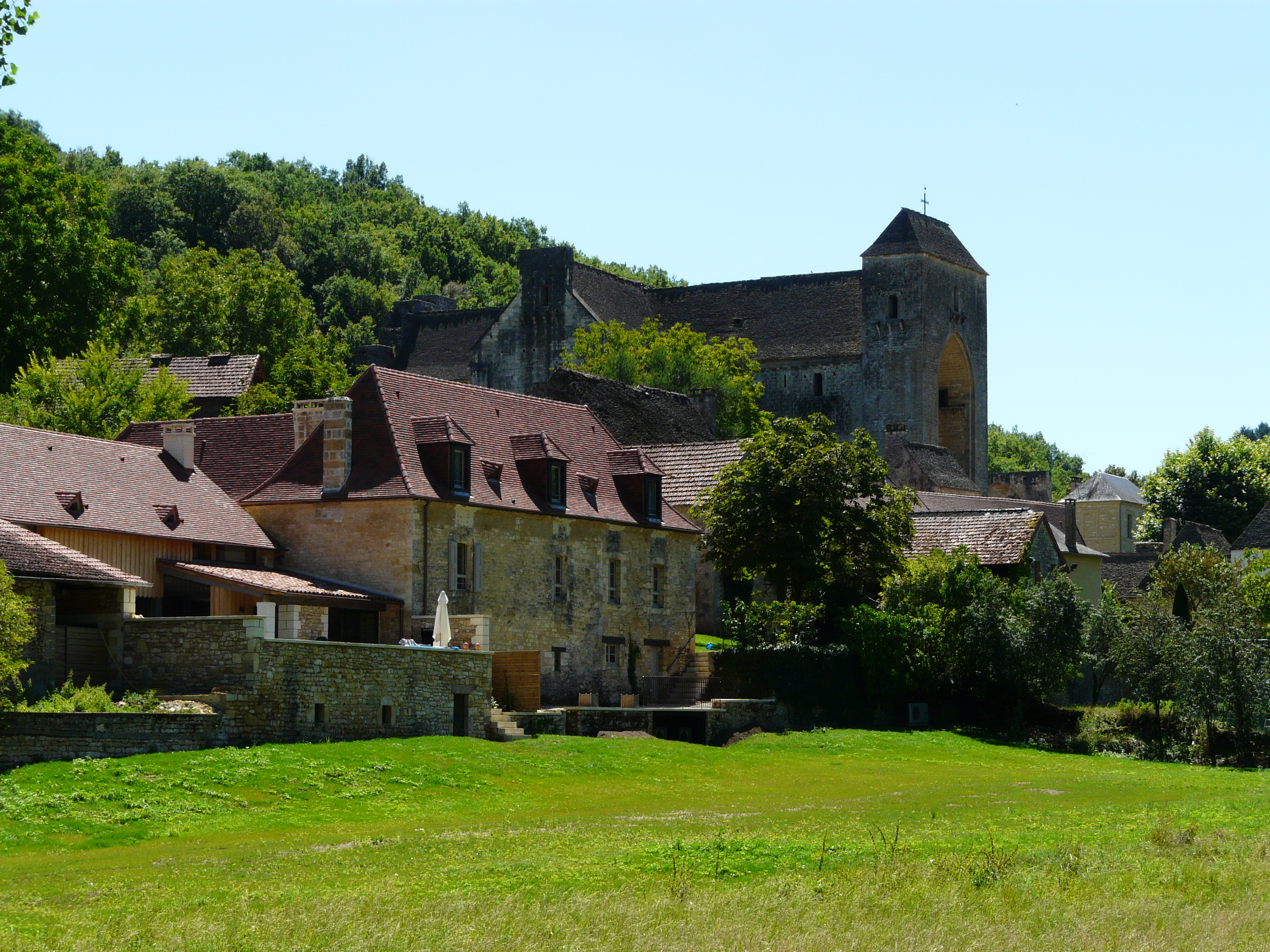
- Saint-Amand-de-Coly

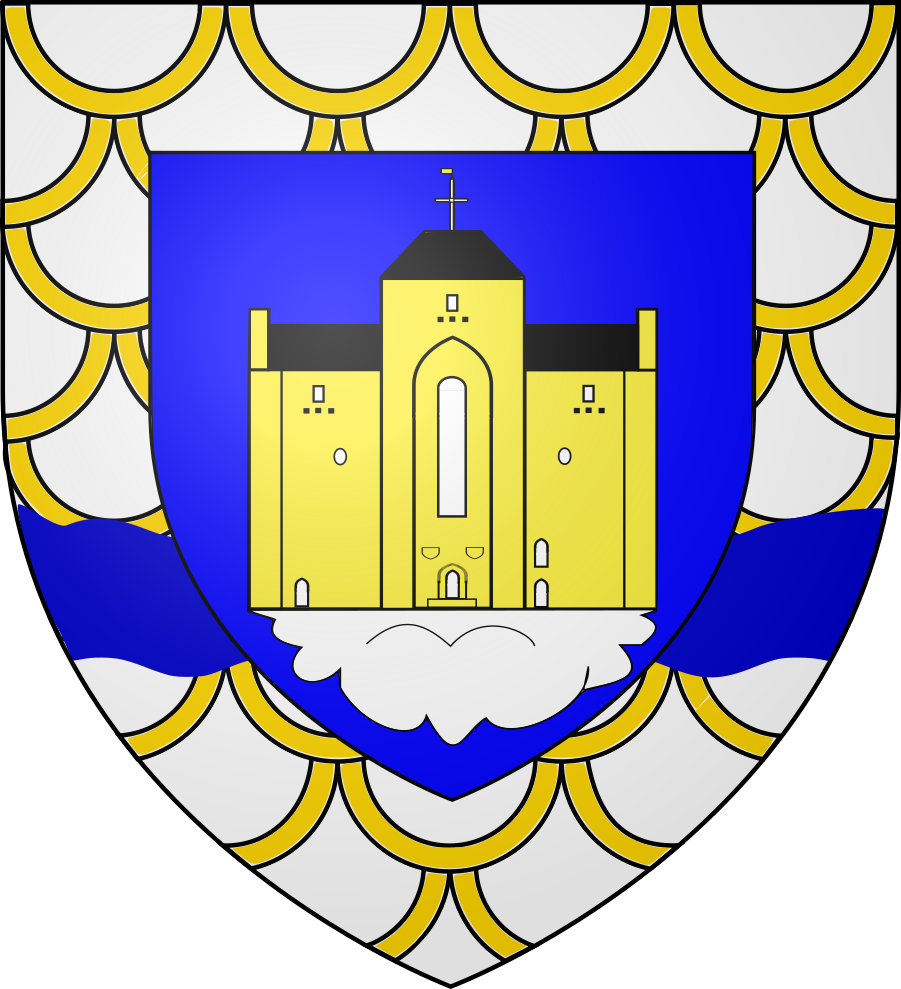
- Coat of arms
- Location of Coly-Saint-Amand
- Location within France Location within Nouvelle-Aquitaine
- Coordinates: 45°03′52″N 1°14′53″E
- Country: France
- Region: Nouvelle-Aquitaine
- Department: Dordogne
- Arrondissement: Sarlat-la-Canéda
- Canton: Vallée de l'Homme
- Intercommunality: Vallée de l'Homme

Government
  - Mayor (2020–2026): Vincent Geoffroid
- Area^{1}: 34.41 km^{2} (13.29 sq mi)
- Highest elevation: 284 m (932 ft)
- Lowest elevation: 105 m (344 ft)
- Population (2023): 640
  - Density: 19/km^{2} (48/sq mi)
- Time zone: UTC+01:00 (CET)
  - Summer (DST): UTC+02:00 (CEST)
- INSEE/Postal code: 24364 /24290
- ^{1} French Land Register data, which excludes lakes, ponds, glaciers > 1 km^{2} (0.386 sq mi or 247 acres) and river estuaries.

Coly-Saint-Amand (French pronunciation: [kɔli sɛ̃.t‿amɑ̃]; Occitan: En Còli e Sench Amand) is a commune in the Dordogne department in Nouvelle-Aquitaine in southwestern France. It was established on 1 January 2019 by merger of the former communes of Saint-Amand-de-Coly (the seat) and Coly.

== See also ==
- Communes of the Dordogne department
