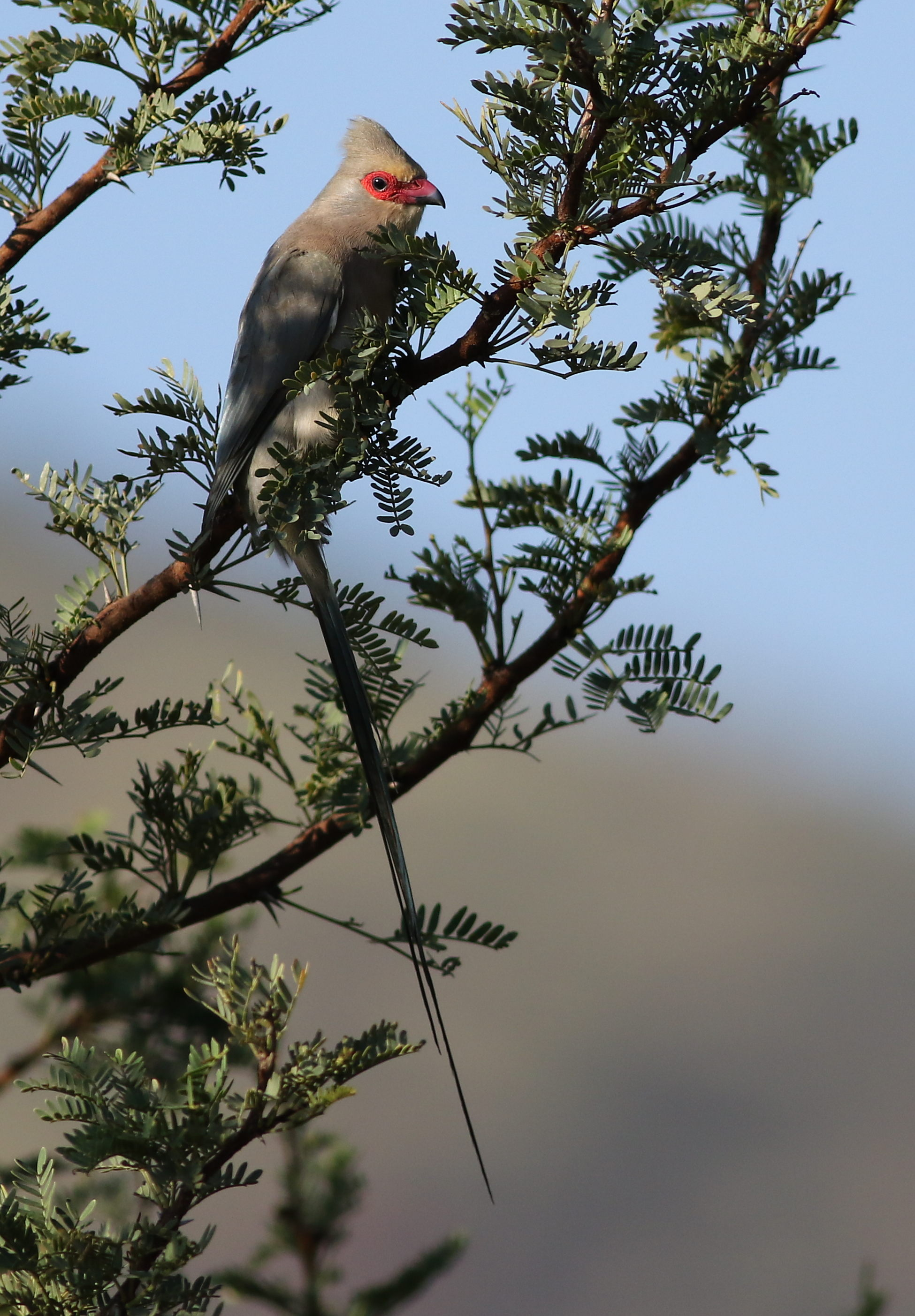

Conservation status
- Least Concern (IUCN 3.1)

Scientific classification
- Kingdom: Animalia
- Phylum: Chordata
- Class: Aves
- Order: Coliiformes
- Family: Coliidae
- Genus: Urocolius
- Species: U. indicus

Binomial name
- Urocolius indicus (Latham, 1790)

Audio
- Call of Urocolius indicus transvaalensis in Pretoria, South Africa

= Red-faced mousebird =

Species of bird

The red-faced mousebird (Urocolius indicus) is a species of mousebird or coly. It is a common in southern Africa from the Democratic Republic of Congo (formerly Zaire), Zambia and Tanzania south to the Cape. Its habitat is savanna with thickets, fynbos scrub, other open woodland, gardens and orchards.

There are a total of five recognized subspecies:

1. Urocolius indicus mossambicus (Distribution: east Angola to southwest Tanzania and Malawi)
2. Urocolius indicus lacteifrons (Distribution: western Angola, north & central Namibia and western Botswana)
3. Urocolius indicus pallidus (Distribution: southeast Tanzania and northeast Mozambique)
4. Urocolius indicus transvaalensis (Distribution: Central and eastern Botswana and southwest Zambia to Mozambique and South Africa)
5. Urocolius indicus indicus (Distribution: south and central South Africa)

This bird is about 34 cm (13 in) long, with the tail comprising approximately half the length. The crested head and breast are pale cinnamon with a red bill and eye mask. The rest of the upperparts and tail are blue-grey apart from a paler grey rump. The belly is whitish. The sexes are similar, but juveniles lack the crest and have a green mask. Their call is tree-ree-ree whistle, and regularly called in multiple repetitions. Red-faced mousebirds make the same call whether in-flight or perched.

The red-faced mousebird is a frugivore which subsists on fruits, berries, leaves, seeds and nectar. Its flight is typically fast, strong and direct from one feeding area to another.

This is a social bird outside the breeding season, feeding together in small groups, normally of about half a dozen birds, but sometimes up to 15 or more. They fly and interact in tight collections. It engages in mutual preening and roosts in groups at night. It is more wary than other mousebirds.

These sedentary birds breed between June and February. The nest is a large untidy cup of plant material lined with material such as sheep wool. The clutch is 2–6 eggs, creamy white with reddish brown spots and hatch in about two weeks.

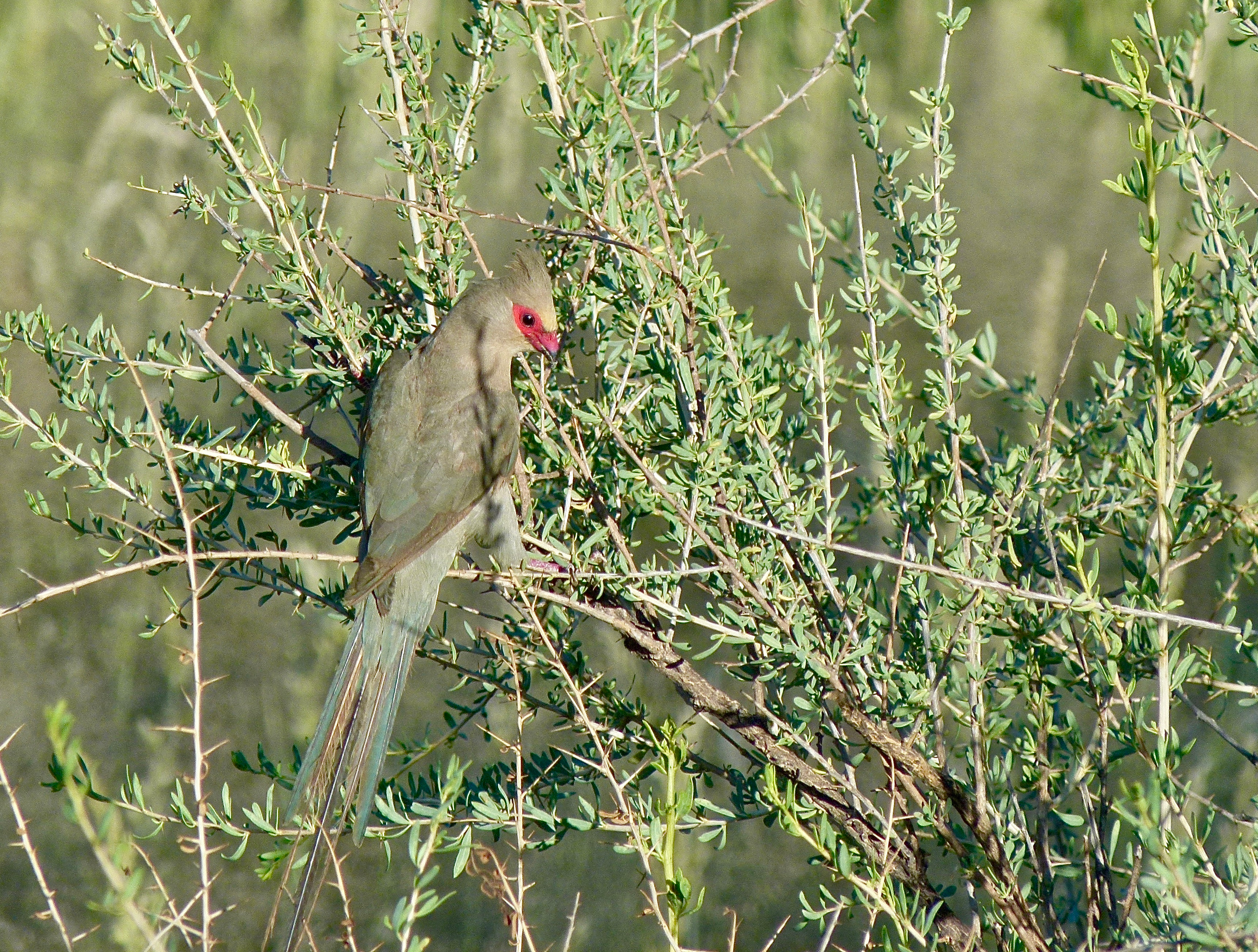
Urocolius indicus

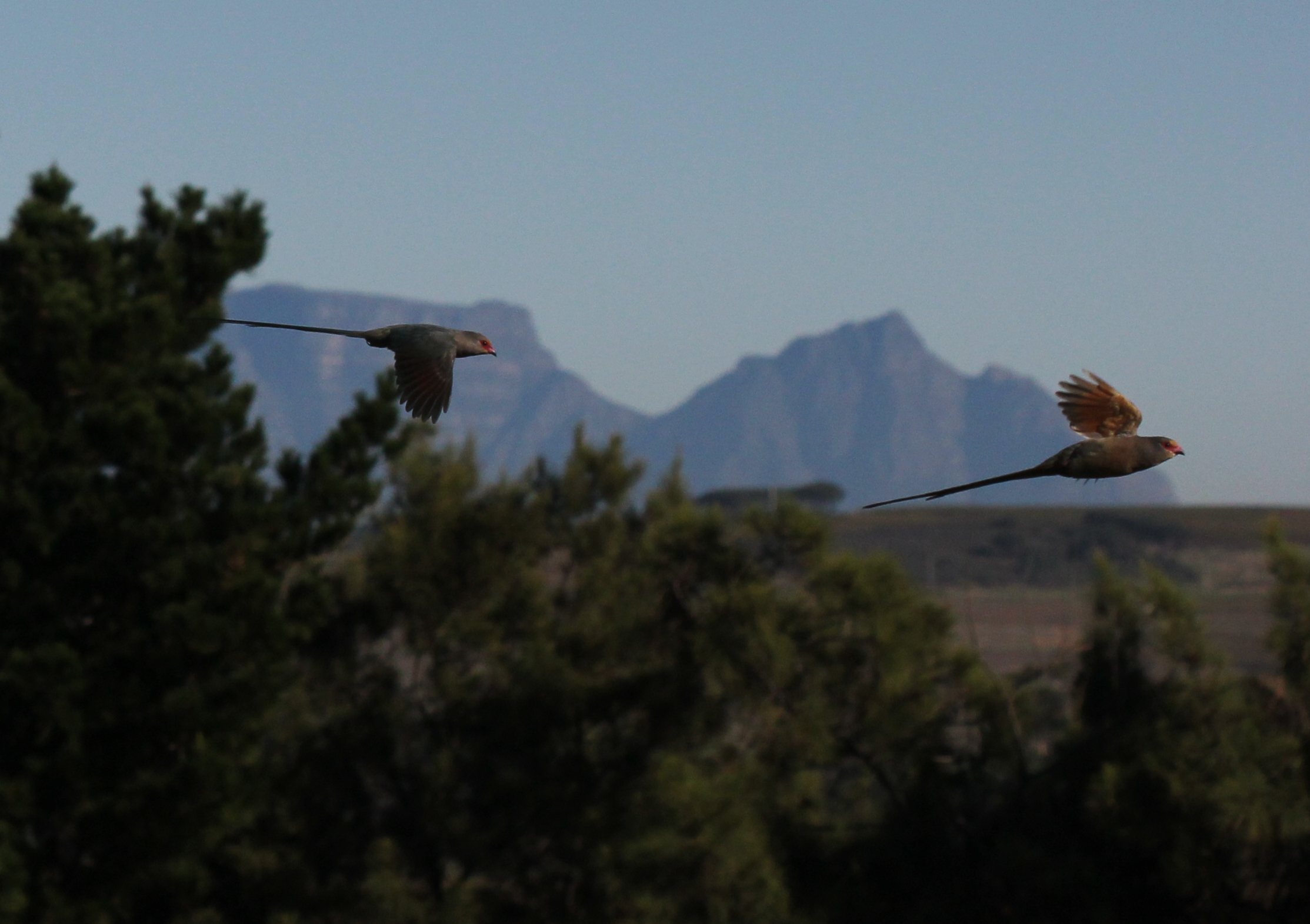
Red-faced mousebird in flight

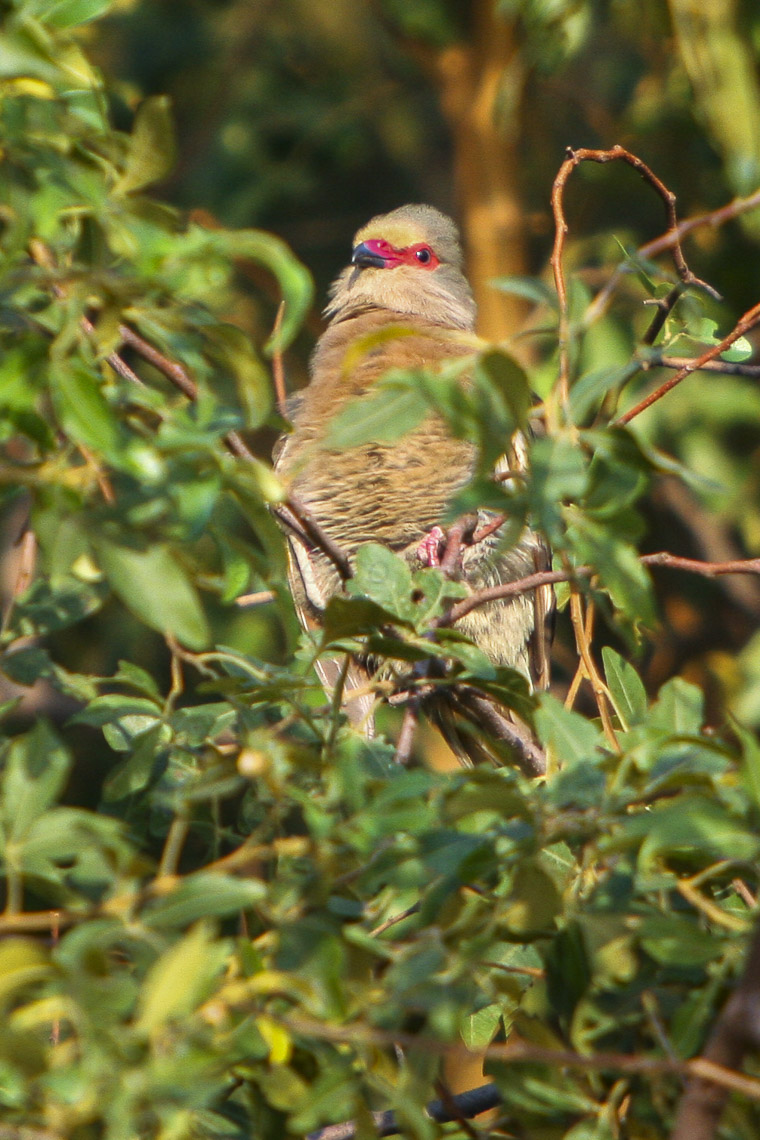
Red-faced mousebird in Zambia

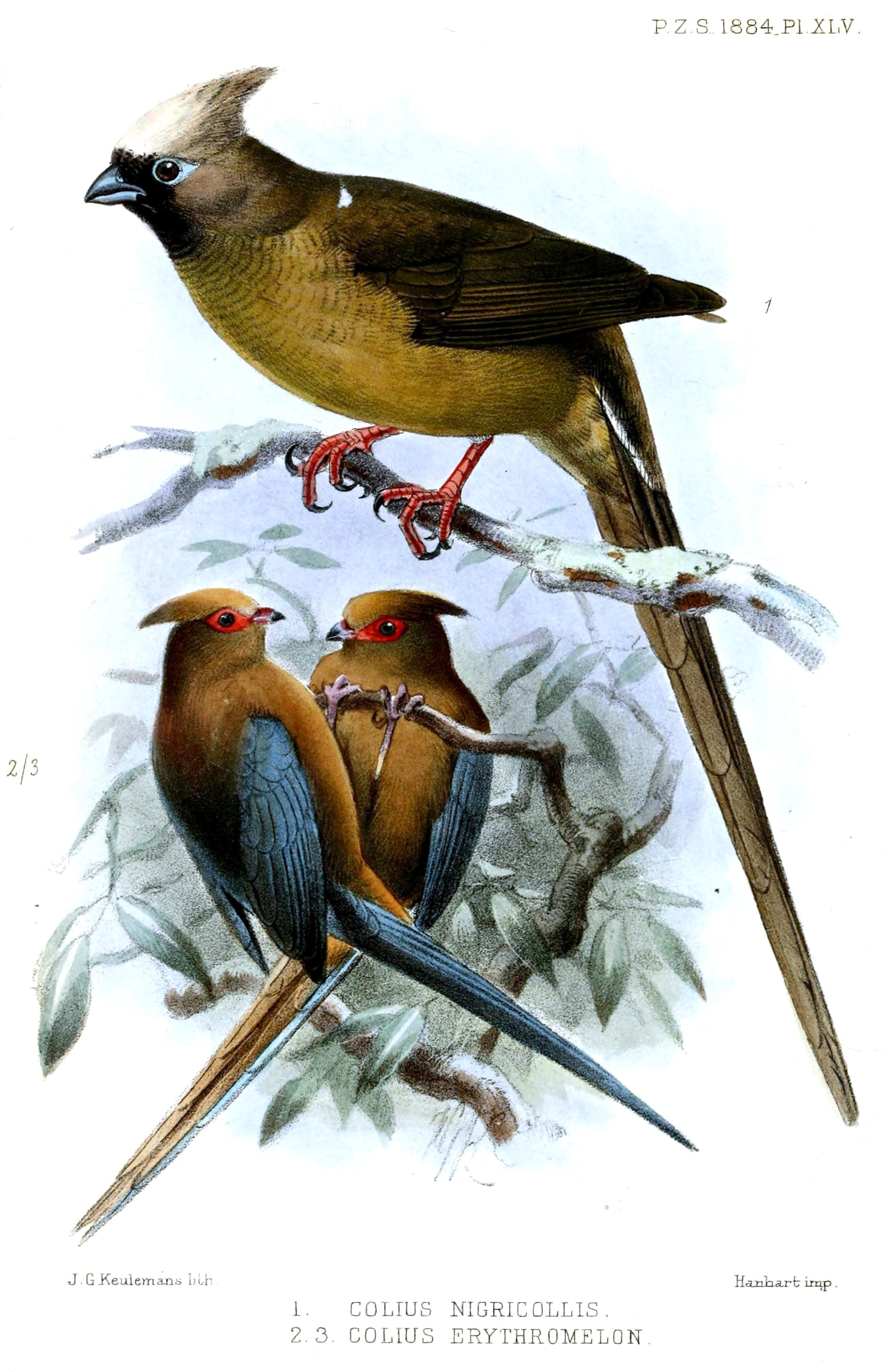
1884 illustration, 1. Colius nigricollis = Colius striatus nigricollis, 2. Colius erythromelon = Urocolius indicus indicus
