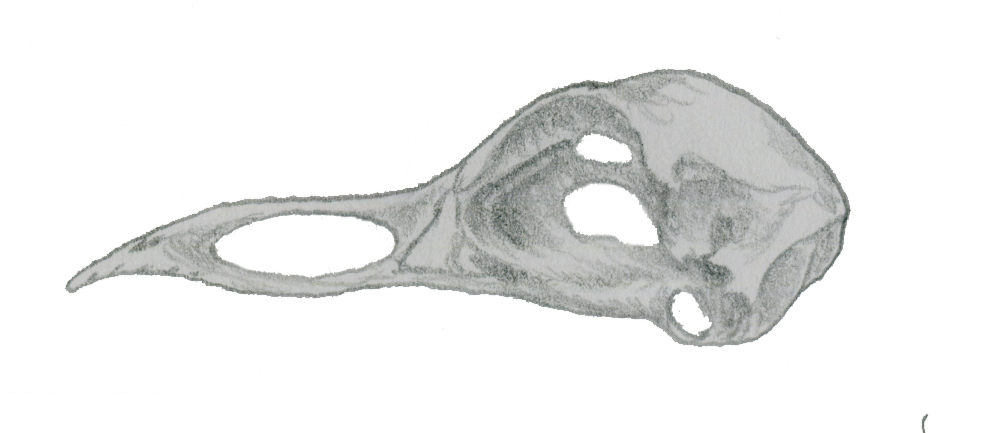
- Skull of Sandcoleus copiosus

Scientific classification
- Kingdom: Animalia
- Phylum: Chordata
- Class: Aves
- Clade: Coraciimorphae
- Order: Coliiformes
- Family: †Sandcoleidae; Houde and Olson, 1992

Genera
- †Anneavis †Sandcoleus †Eoglaucidium †Tsidiiyazhi

= Sandcoleidae =

Sandcoleidae Temporal range: Danian–Ypresian

Extinct family of birds

Sandcoleidae is an extinct family of birds in the order Coliiformes (mousebirds). Fossils of this family have been found in Denmark and the United States. The group may be paraphyletic and is sometimes placed in the separate order Sandcoleiformes.

== Taxonomy ==
Order COLIIFORMES

- Family †Sandcoleidae Houde & Olson 1992 sensu Mayr & Mourer-Chauviré 2004
  - Genus †Sandcoleus Houde & Olson 1992
    - †S. copiosus
  - Genus †Anneavis Houde & Olson 1992
    - †A. anneae
  - Genus †Eoglaucidium Fischer 1987
    - †E. pallas
  - Genus †Tsidiiyazhi Ksepka et al., 2017
    - †T. abini

Some authorities also include Selmes absurdipes, Chascacocolius oscitans and Eobucco brodkorbi in this family.
