= Saint-Amand-de-Coly =

- Part of Coly-Saint-Amand
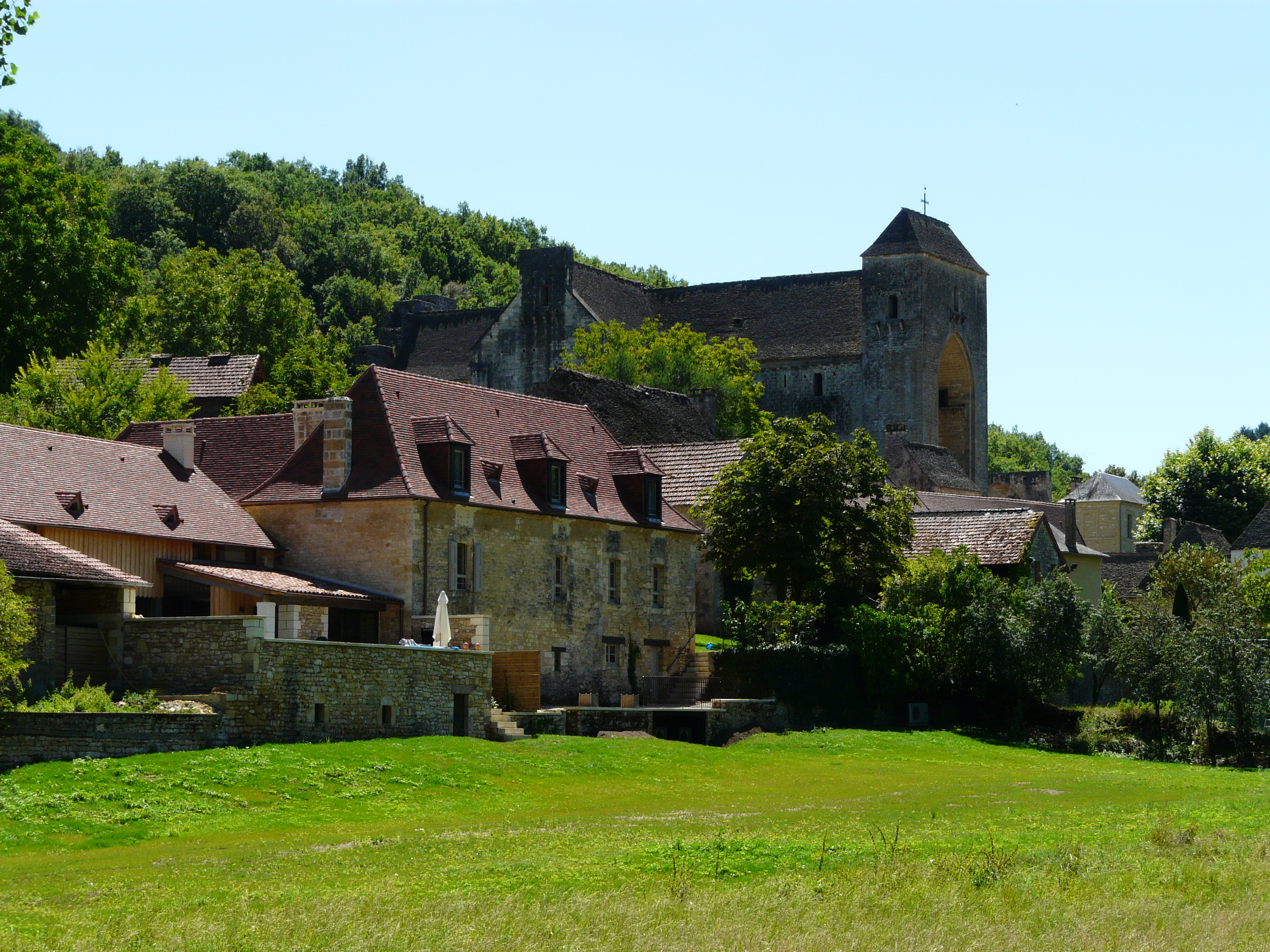

- Coat of arms
- Location of Saint-Amand-de-Coly
- Location within France Location within Nouvelle-Aquitaine
- Coordinates: 45°03′52″N 1°14′53″E
- Country: France
- Region: Nouvelle-Aquitaine
- Department: Dordogne
- Arrondissement: Sarlat-la-Canéda
- Canton: Vallée de l'Homme
- Commune: Coly-Saint-Amand
- Area^{1}: 26.40 km^{2} (10.19 sq mi)
- Elevation: 165 m (541 ft)
- Highest elevation: 284 m (932 ft)
- Lowest elevation: 114 m (374 ft)
- Population (2023): 422
  - Density: 16.0/km^{2} (41.4/sq mi)
- Time zone: UTC+01:00 (CET)
  - Summer (DST): UTC+02:00 (CEST)
- Postal code: 24290
- ^{1} French Land Register data, which excludes lakes, ponds, glaciers > 1 km^{2} (0.386 sq mi or 247 acres) and river estuaries.

Saint-Amand-de-Coly (French pronunciation: [sɛ̃.t‿amɑ̃ də kɔli]; Limousin: Sench Amand de Còli) is a former commune in the Dordogne department in Nouvelle-Aquitaine in southwestern France. On 1 January 2019, it was merged into the new commune Coly-Saint-Amand.

The village is a member of the Les Plus Beaux Villages de France ("The most beautiful villages of France") association.

== Geography ==
In the heart of the Dordogne, the town of Saint-Amand-de-Coly is crossed from south to north-east by Chironde, a thin tributary of Coly and sub-tributary of the Vézère.

The village is located eight kilometers east of Montignac, both southwest of Terrasson-Lavilledieu and 19 kilometers north of Sarlat-la-Caneda, away from main roads.

In the Middle Ages, Saint-Amand-de-Coly guarded the source of the Coly, until it fell.

The town is served by 64 county roads (southeast) and 704 (formerly 704 national road in the southwest).

== History ==
The town has several places traces of prehistoric human occupation, inn addition to Gallo-Roman.

Although the Augustinian abbey was built in the twelfth century, the first known written mention of the place dates back to the fourteenth century in the Latin form Amandus prope Montinhacum Sanctus ("Saint Amand near Montignac").

The town, during the revolutionary period of the National Convention (1792-1795), was named Amand-le-Vallon.

== Toponymy ==
The name of the town refers to St. Amand, hermit came to evangelize the region in the sixth century including near the village of Coly, where the abbots had a castle verified in 1406 (Castrum de Coly).

In Occitan, the town is named Sench Amand de Còli.

== Administrative structure ==
The city of Saint-Amand-de-Coly, as early as 1790, was part of the canton of Cassagne which was part of District Montignac until 1795, the date districts were dissolved. When this district was dissolved by the law of 8 pluviôse year IX (28 January 1801) on "reducing the number of justices of the peace," the district was made part of the township of Montignac, which was part of the district of Sarlat (now the district of Sarlat-la-Caneda since 1965).

At the end of 2001, all of the communes of the Vézère Valley were made part of Saint-Amand-de-Coly. It was dissolved on 31 December 2013 and replaced on 1 January 2014 by the community of cities of the Valley of Man.

== Sites and monuments ==
- Château de la Grande Filolie 14th century, listed as a historical monuments since 1947.
- Romanesque Church from the 12th century, rebuilt largely in the 19th and 20th centuries, on the remains of a ruined abbey, the Abbey of Saint-Amand-de-Coly. The building is particularly remarkable for the elevation of the nave and integration of Gothic techniques in a novel style. It is a fortified church protected by a ring of ramparts. It was listed as a historical monument in 1965.
- Former hospital for the poor built in the 14th century and restored in the 18th century.
- There is also an interesting atelier that makes classic French copper cookware.
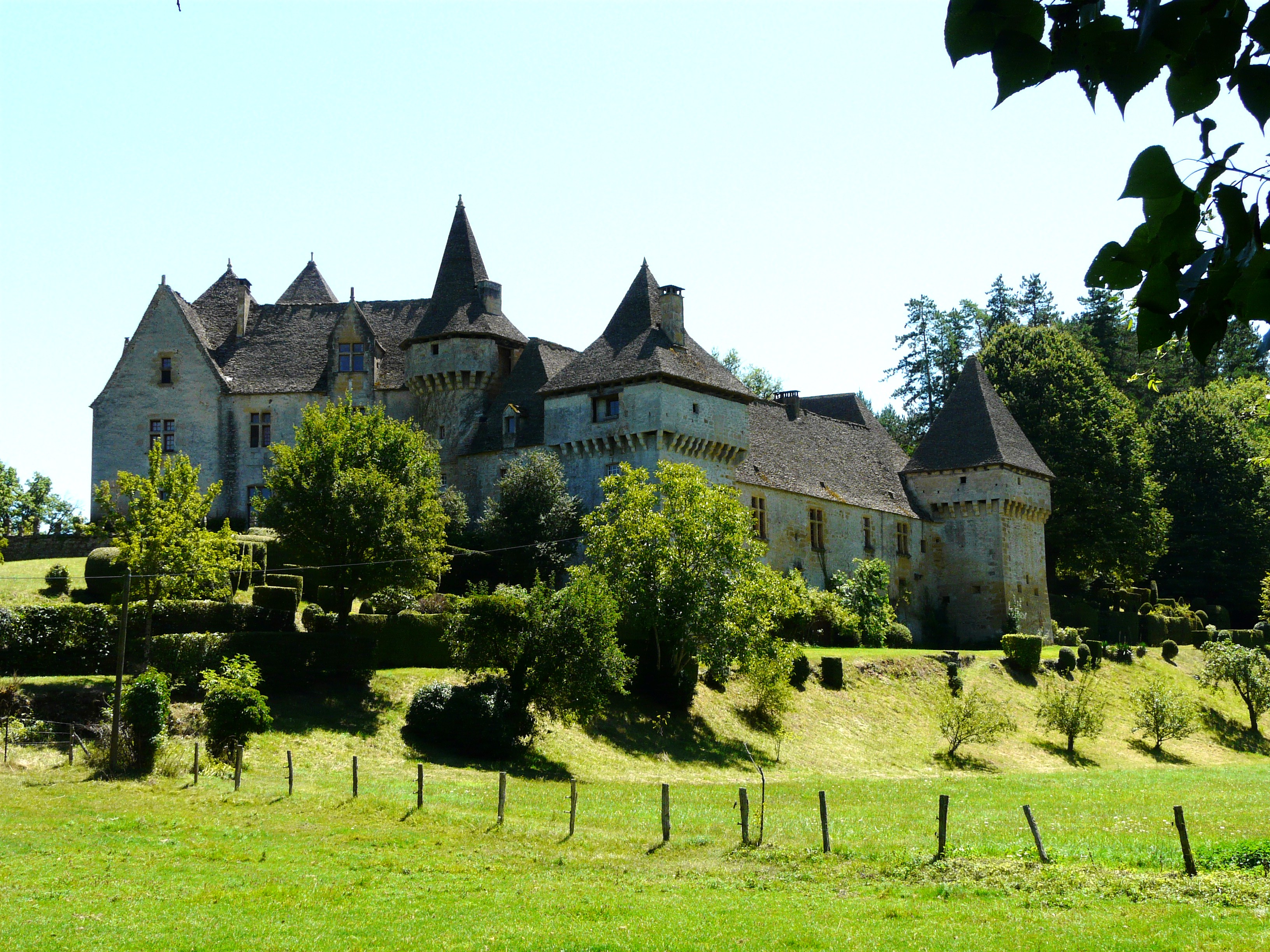
Château de la Grande Filolie

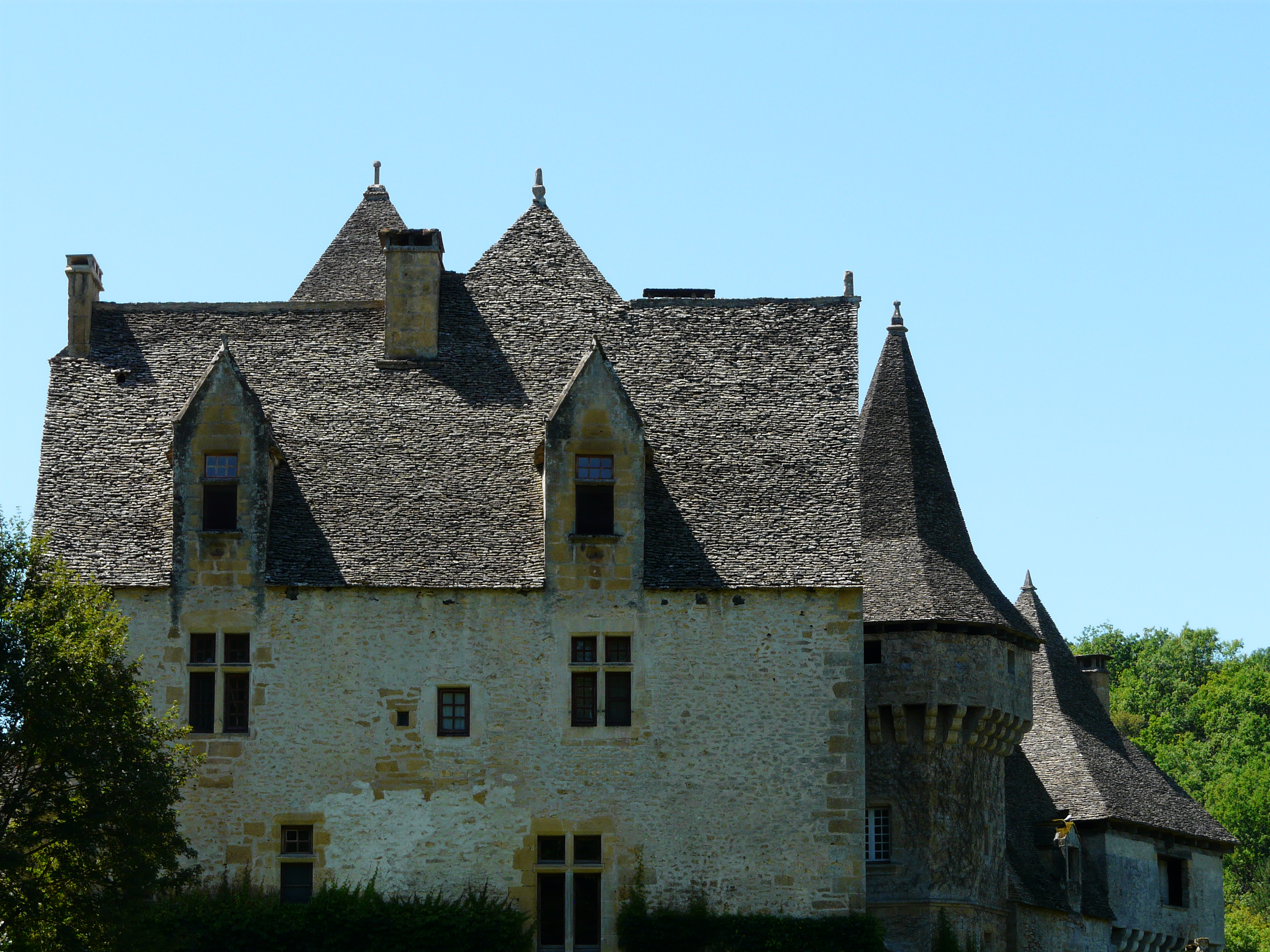
Château de la Grande Filolie

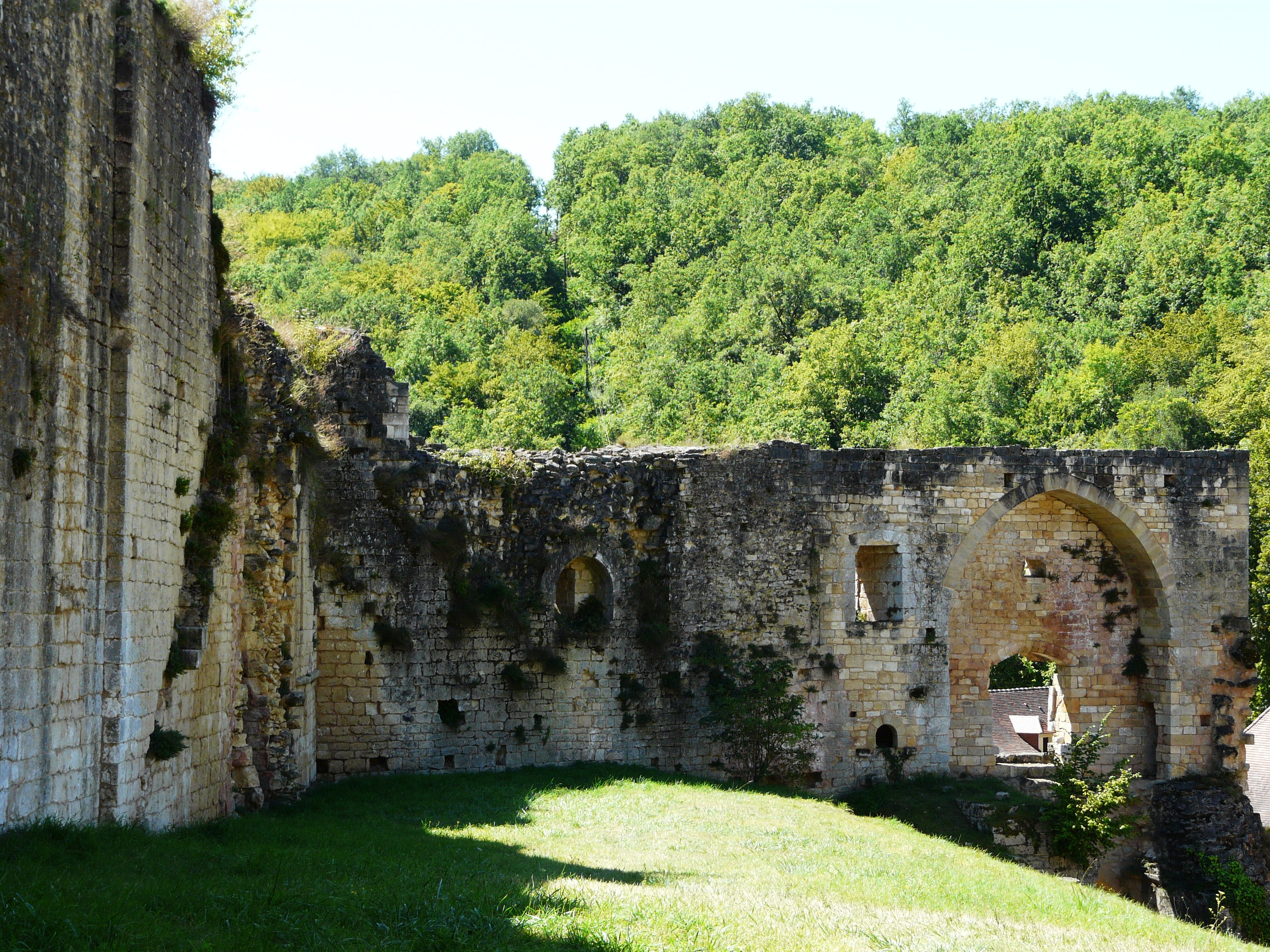
The remains of the walls of the abbey

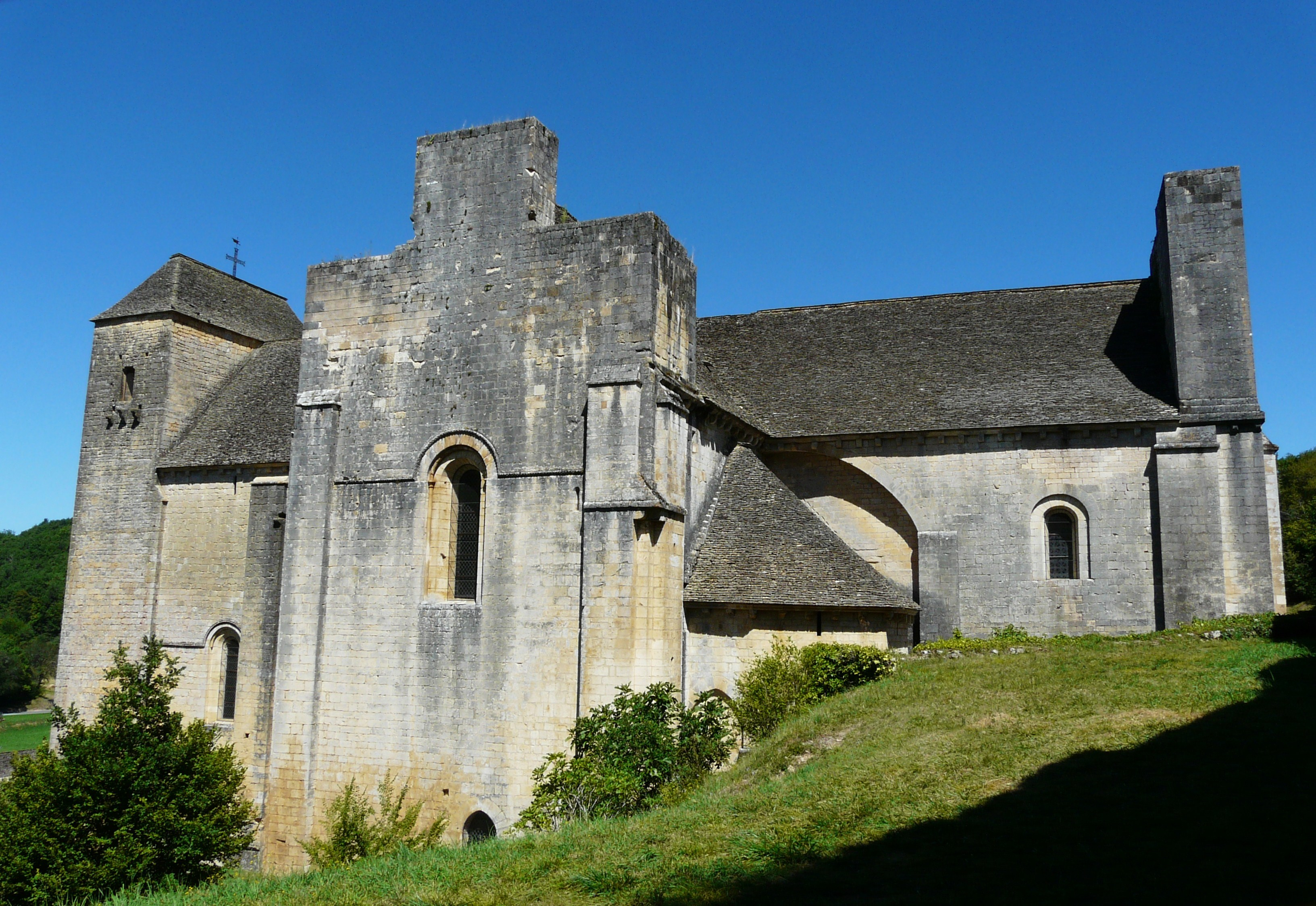
The old abbey

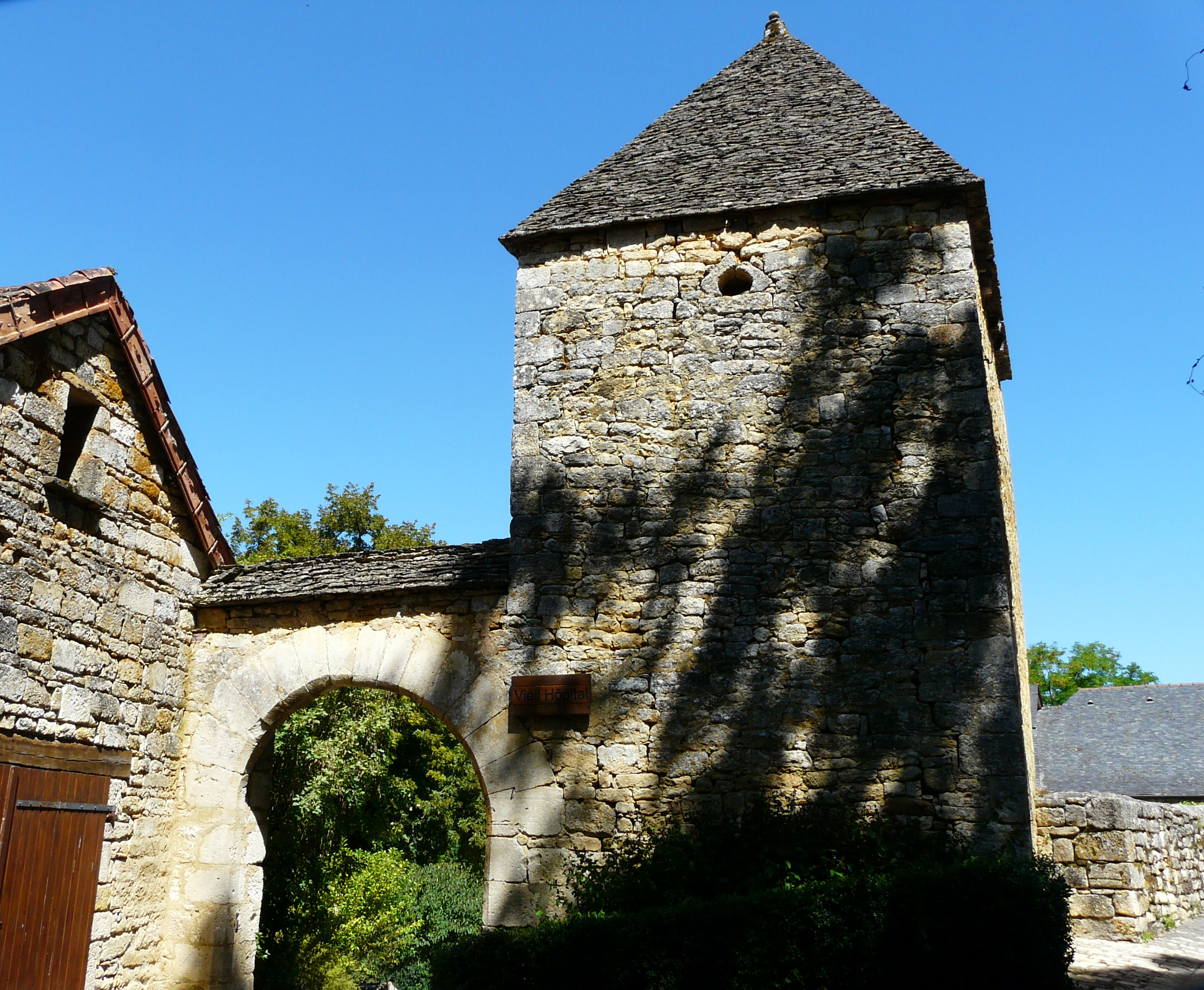
The entrance to the old hospital

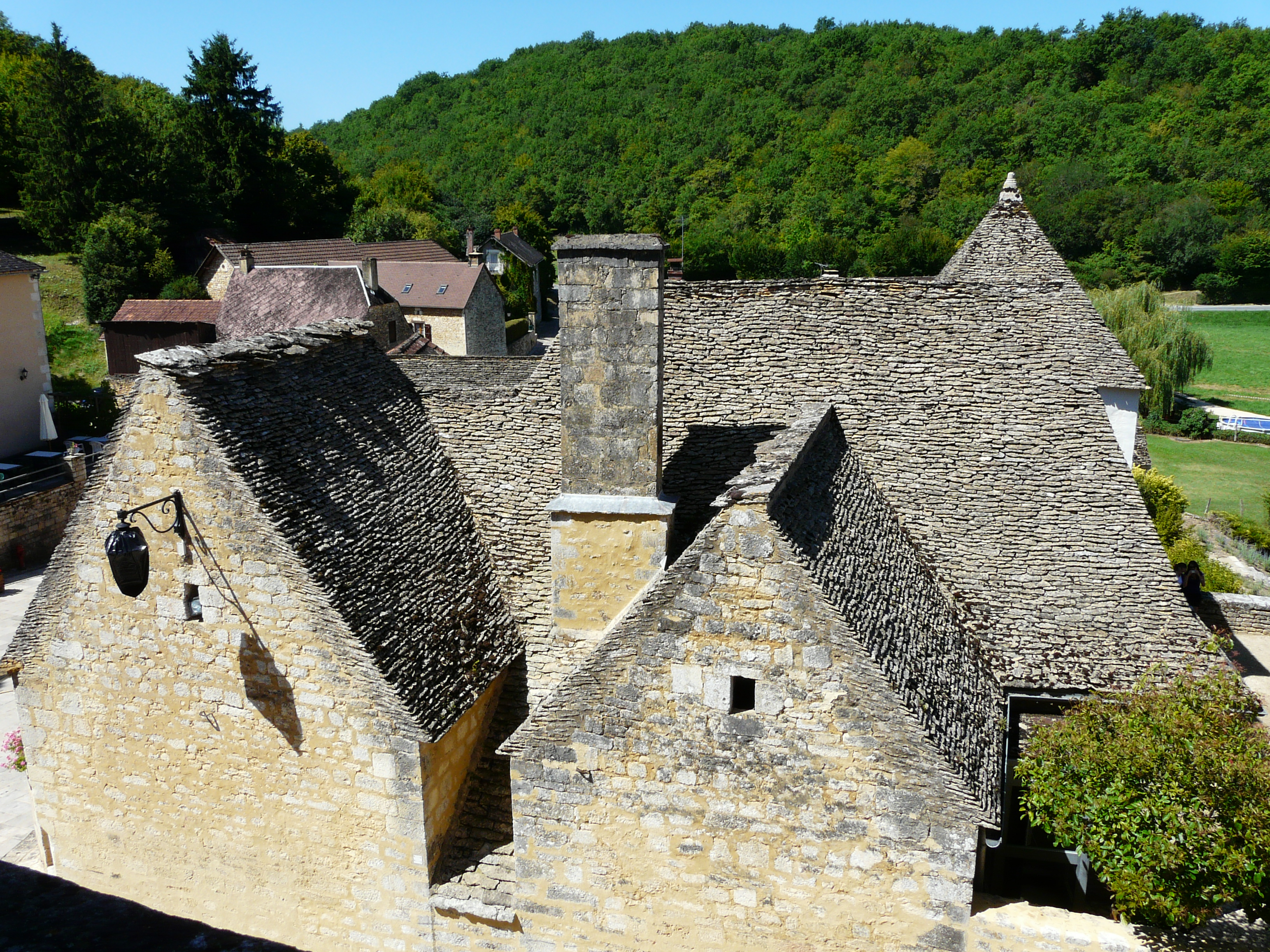
The tiled roofs of the village

== People linked to the town ==
- Roger Bambuck, athlete and former Minister of Sports, has had a house there since 1973.

== Local Life ==
The village festival is held every year on 15 August, with Mass of Saint-Hubert sounded by hunting horns, with meals of Périgord specialties, dancing, entertainment and more.

In July and August there is a farmer's market in the tobacco barn. Every Tuesday from 17:30, producers offer their products (meat, canned fruits and vegetables, wines, cheeses, cakes, and more).

In August, the abbey hosts several classical music concerts and master classes early music, as part of the Festival de Périgord Noir.

== See also ==
- Communes of the Dordogne department

== Bibliography ==
- Tanet, Chantal; Hordé, Tristan (2003). Dictionnaire des noms de lieux du Périgord [Dictionary of Place Names of Périgord] (in French). éditions Fanlac. ISBN 978-2865772155. Tanet.
