= Eocolius =

Eocolius Temporal range: Early Eocene

Scientific classification
- Kingdom: Animalia
- Phylum: Chordata
- Class: Aves
- Order: Coliiformes
- Genus: †Eocolius
- Species: †E. walkeri

Binomial name
- †Eocolius walkeri Dyke & Waterhouse, 2001

Extinct genus of birds

Eocolius is an extinct genus of mousebird that inhabited England during the Eocene epoch. It contains a single species, E. walkeri.
