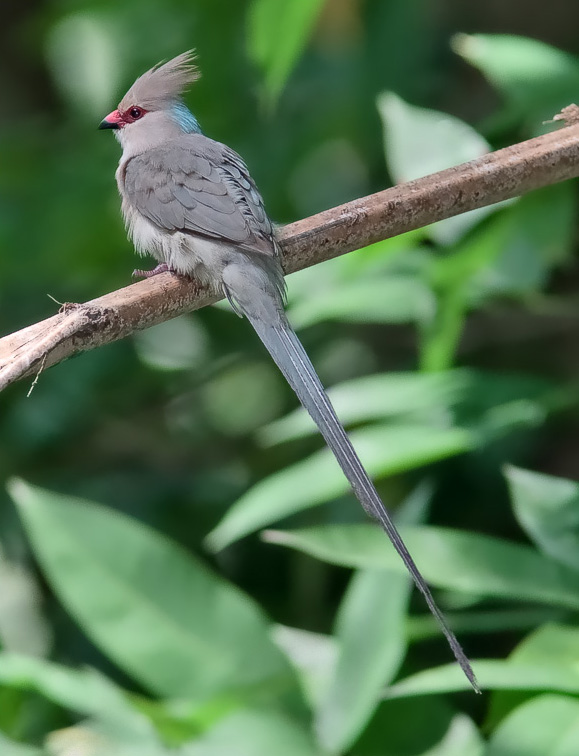
- Blue-naped mousebird Urocolius macrourus

Scientific classification
- Kingdom: Animalia
- Phylum: Chordata
- Class: Aves
- Order: Coliiformes
- Family: Coliidae
- Genus: Urocolius; Bonaparte, 1854

Type species
- Lanius macrourus Linnaeus, 1766

Species
- Urocolius indicus Urocolius macrourus

= Urocolius =

Genus of birds

Urocolius is a small genus of mousebirds.

== Species ==
It consists of two species which inhabit Eastern and Southern Africa:

Image	Common name	Scientific name	Distribution
	Blue-naped mousebird	Urocolius macrourus	East Africa
	Red-faced mousebird	Urocolius indicus	southern Africa from Zaire, Zambia and Tanzania south to the Cape.

== Description ==
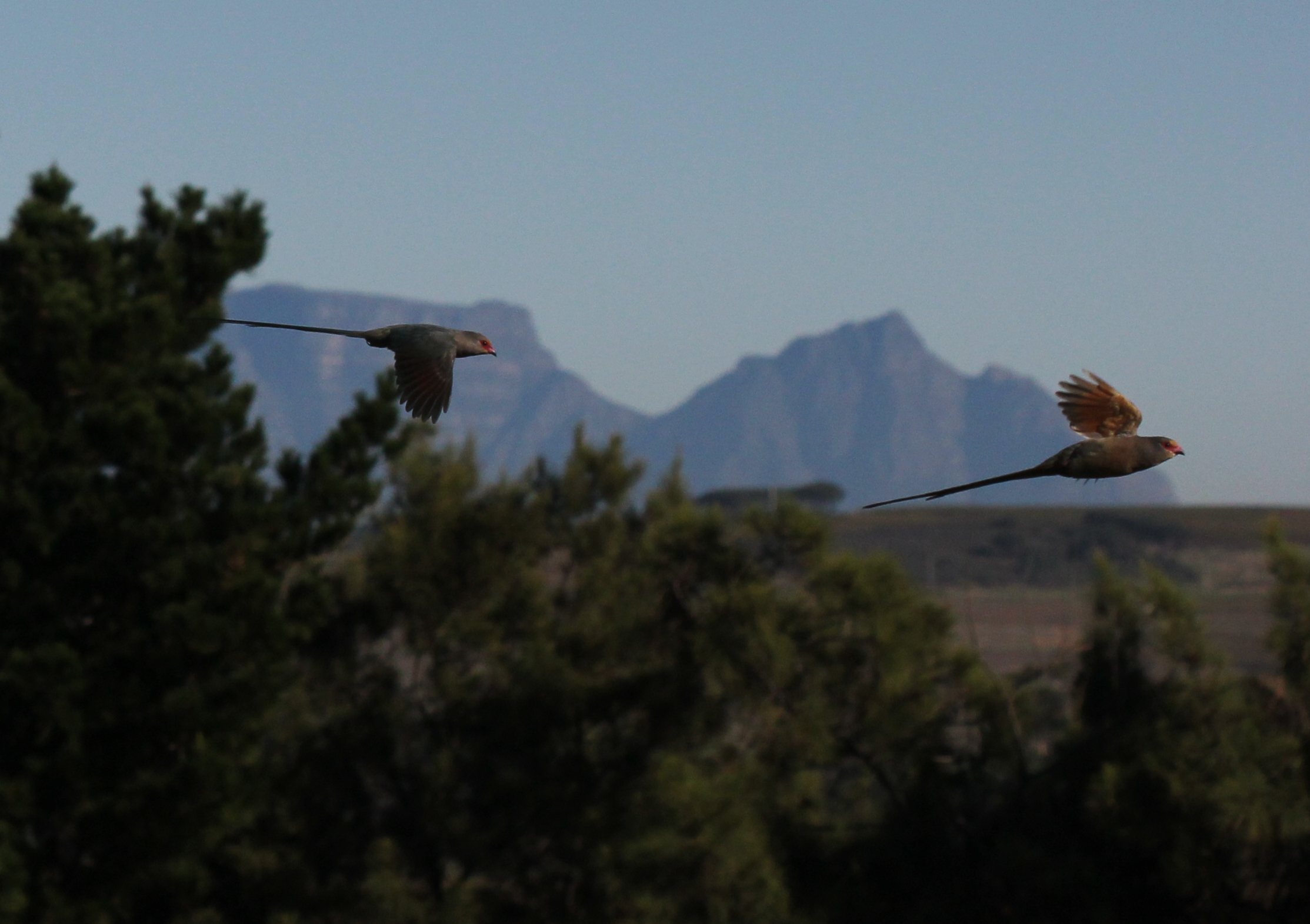
Red-faced mousebird Urocolius indicus in flight

They are typically about 32 cm (13 in) long omnivorous birds, eating insects, small millipedes and plant material. Urocolius indicus in particular eats a great deal of fruit, leaves, buds, flowers, nectar and similar material.

"Urocolius" archiaci, "U." consobrinus and "U." paludicola are 3 taxa described from fragmentary Early Miocene remains found at Saint-Gérand-le-Puy in France. Their taxonomic history is convoluted, being initially described as woodpeckers and variously merged and split. Today it is believed that at least 2 belong to the prehistoric genus Limnatornis. They sometimes are all united under the first of the 3 names although it is not clear with what justification. The same rationales presumably apply for undescribed but similar remains found in Late Miocene strata at Kohfidisch (Austria).
