= Château de la Grande Filolie =

Château in Nouvelle-Aquitaine, France

Coordinates: 45°02′40″N 1°12′38″E

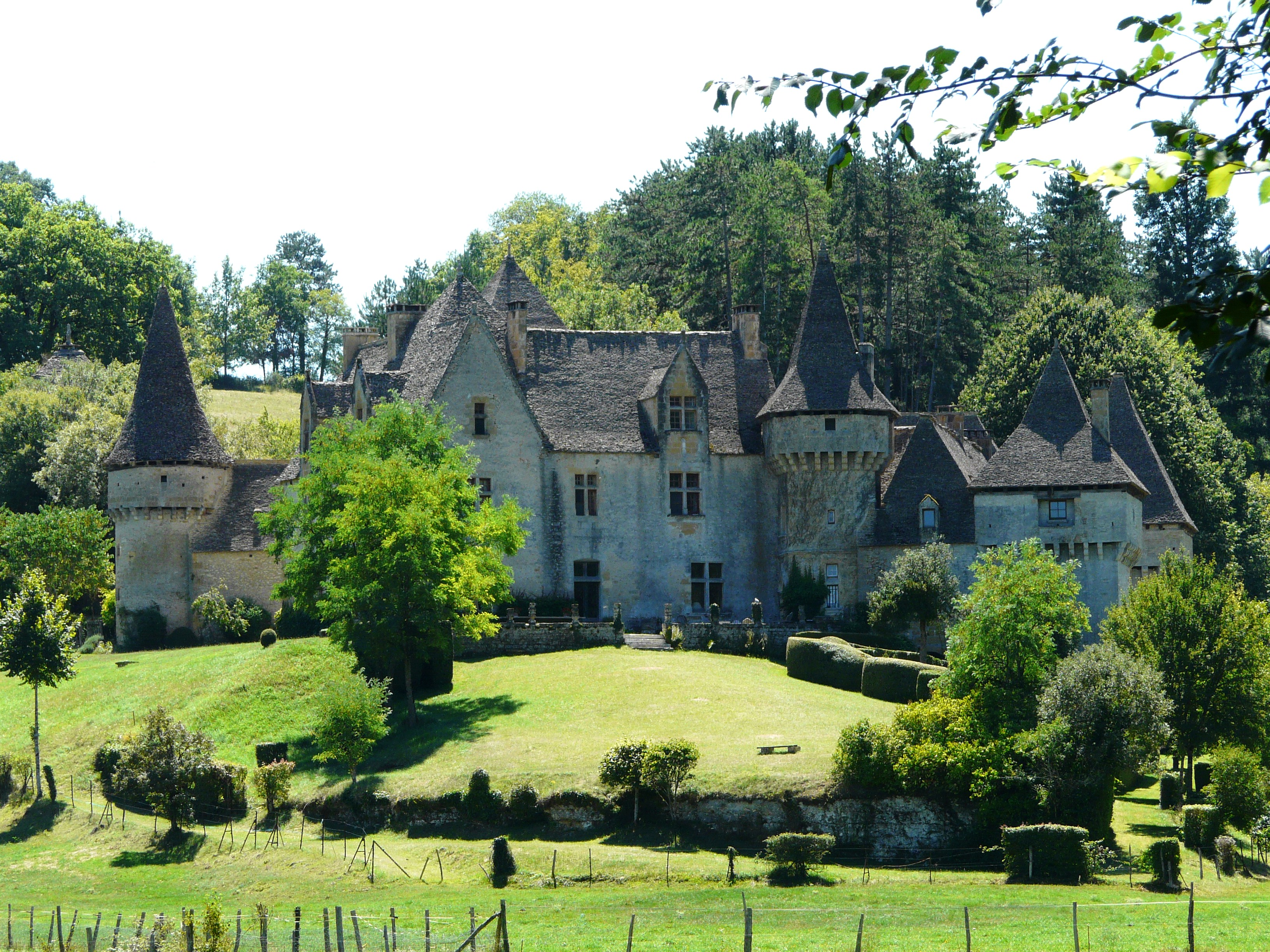
The Grande Filolie castle, Saint-Amand-de-Coly, Dordogne, France

The Château de la Grande Filolie is a château in Saint-Amand-de-Coly, Dordogne, Nouvelle-Aquitaine, France.
