= Celericolius =

Celericolius Temporal range: Ypresian

Scientific classification
- Kingdom: Animalia
- Phylum: Chordata
- Class: Aves
- Order: Coliiformes
- Family: Coliidae
- Genus: †Celericolius
- Species: †C. acriala

Binomial name
- †Celericolius acriala Ksepka & Clarke, 2010

Extinct genus of birds

Celericolius is an extinct genus of coliiform bird that lived during the Ypresian stage of the Eocene epoch.

== Distribution ==
Celericolius acriala is known from the Fossil Butte Member of the Green River Formation.
