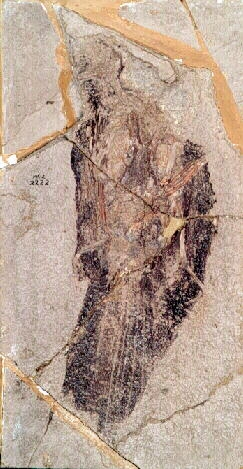

Scientific classification
- Kingdom: Animalia
- Phylum: Chordata
- Class: Aves
- Clade: Coraciimorphae
- Order: Coliiformes
- Family: Coliidae
- Genus: †Palaeospiza; Allen, 1878

Species
- †Palaeospiza bella Allen 1878

= Palaeospiza =

Paleospiza Temporal range: Priabonian

Genus of fossil mousebird

Palaeospiza bella ("beautiful ancient chaffinch") is a bird which was originally considered a passerine but is now included in the Coliiformes. Palaeospiza bella lived in what is now Colorado in the Eocene and Oligocene.
