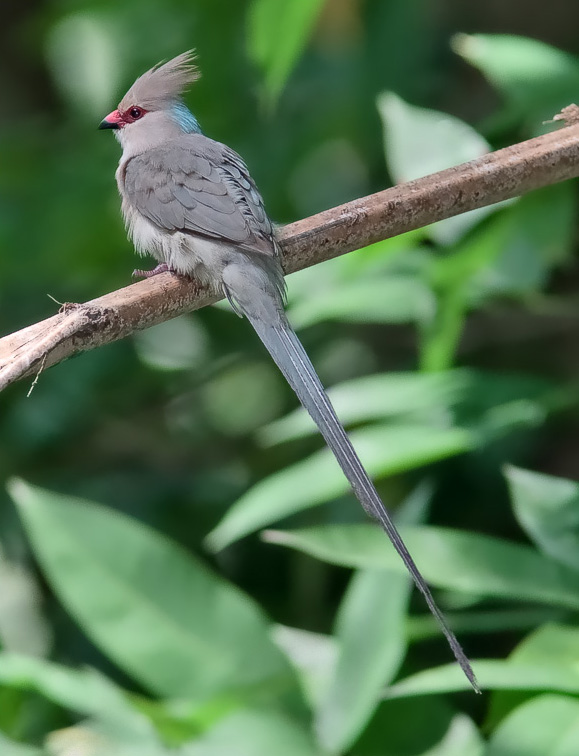
- Blue-naped mousebird (Urocolius macrourus)

Scientific classification
- Kingdom: Animalia
- Phylum: Chordata
- Class: Aves
- Clade: Coraciimorphae
- Order: Coliiformes; Murie, 1872
- Family: Coliidae; Swainson, 1837

Genera
- Colius; Urocolius; For fossil taxa, see text.

= Mousebird =

Mousebirds Temporal range: Paleocene - Holocene, 62.5–0 Ma

Order of birds

The mousebirds are birds in the order Coliiformes. They are the sister group to the clade Cavitaves, which includes the Leptosomiformes (the cuckoo roller), Trogoniformes (trogons), Bucerotiformes (hornbills and hoopoes), Piciformes (woodpeckers, toucans, and barbets) and Coraciiformes (kingfishers, bee-eaters, rollers, motmots, and todies). This group is now confined to sub-Saharan Africa, and it is the only bird order confined entirely to that continent, with the possible exception of turacos which are considered by some as the distinct order Musophagiformes, and the cuckoo roller, which is the only member of the order Leptosomiformes, and which is found in Madagascar but not mainland Africa. Mousebirds had a wider range in the Paleogene, with a widespread distribution in Europe and North America during the Paleocene.

== Description ==
Mousebirds are slender greyish or brown birds with soft, hairlike body feathers. They are typically about 10 cm (3.9 in) in body length, with a long, thin tail a further 20–24 cm (7.9–9.4 in) in length, and weigh 45–55 g (1.6–1.9 oz). They are arboreal and scurry through the leaves like rodents, in search of berries, fruit and buds. This habit, and their legs, gives rise to the group's English name. They are acrobatic, and can feed upside down. All species have strong claws and reversible outer toes (pamprodactyl feet). They also have crests and stubby bills.

== Behaviour and ecology ==
Mousebirds are gregarious, again reinforcing the analogy with mice, and are found in bands of about 20 in lightly wooded country. These birds build cup-shaped twig nests in trees, which are lined with grasses. Clutches of two to three eggs are typically laid.

== Systematics and evolution ==
The mousebirds could be considered "living fossils" as the six species extant today are merely the survivors of a lineage that was massively more diverse in the early Paleogene and Miocene. There are comparatively abundant fossils of Coliiformes, but it has not been easy to assemble a robust phylogeny. The family is documented to exist from the Early Paleocene onwards; by at least the Late Eocene, two families are known to have existed, the extant Coliidae and the longer-billed prehistorically extinct Sandcoleidae.

The latter were previously a separate order, but eventually it was realized that they had come to group ancestral Coraciiformes, the actual sandcoleids and forms like Neanis together in a paraphyletic assemblage. Even though the sandcoleids are now assumed to be monophyletic following the removal of these taxa, many forms cannot be conclusively assigned to one family or the other. The genus Selmes, for example, is probably a coliid, but only distantly related to the modern genera.

Extinct Coliiformes occupied a wide range of ecologies. Sandcoleids in particular often preserve uncrushed seeds on their stomachs, while bearing talons similar to those of modern birds of prey.

== Summary of extant species ==
Common name	Binomial name	Population	Status	Trend	Notes	Image
Red-backed mousebird	Colius castanotus	unknown	LC	▼		
White-backed mousebird	Colius colius	unknown	LC	▲		
White-headed mousebird	Colius leucocephalus	unknown	LC	Steady		
Speckled mousebird	Colius striatus	unknown	LC	▲		
Red-faced mousebird	Urocolius indicus	unknown	LC	?		
Blue-naped mousebird	Urocolius macrourus	unknown	LC	▼		

== Taxonomy ==
Order COLIIFORMES

- Genus †Botauroides Shufeldt 1915 (Eocene of Wyoming, US)
  - †B. parvus Shufeldt 1915
- Genus †Eobucco Feduccia & Martin 1976 - sandcoleid?
  - †E. brodkorbi Feduccia & Martin 1976
- Genus †Eocolius Dyke & Waterhouse 2001 (London Clay Early Eocene of Walton-on-the-Naze, England) - sandcoleid or coliid
  - †E. walkeri Dyke & Waterhouse 2001
- Genus †Limnatornis Milne-Edwards 1871 [Palaeopicus Lambrecht 1933 ex Brodkorb 1952] (Early Miocene of Saint-Gérand-le-Puy, France) - coliid? (Urocolius?)
  - †L. consobrinus (Milne-Edwards 1871) [Picus consobrinus Milne-Edwards 1871; Palaeopicus consobrinus (Milne-Edwards 1871) Lambrecht 1933 nomen nudum; Urocolius consobrinus (Milne-Edwards 1871)]
  - †L. paludicola Milne-Edwards 1871 [Colius paludicola (Milne-Edwards 1871) Ballmann 1969a; Urocolius paludicola (Milne-Edwards 1871)]
  - †L. archiaci (Milne-Edwards 1871) [Picus archiaci Milne-Edwards 1871; Colius archiaci (Milne-Edwards 1871) Ballmann 1969a; Urocolius archiaci (Milne-Edwards 1871) Mlíkovský 2002] (Early Miocene of Saint-Gérand-le-Puy, France)
- Coliiformes gen. et sp. indet. (Late Miocene of Kohfidisch, Austria)
- Genus †Uintornis Marsh 1872 - sandcoleid?
  - †U. lucaris Brodkorb 1971
  - †U. marionae Feduccia & Martin 1976
- Family †Chascacocoliidae Zelenkov & Dyke 2008
  - Genus †Chascacocolius Houde & Olson 1992 (Late Paleocene ?- Early Eocene) - basal? sandcoleid?
    - †C. oscitans Houde & Olson 1992
    - †C. cacicirostris Mayr 2005
- Family †Selmeidae Zelenkov & Dyke 2008
  - Genus †Selmes Mayr 1998 ex Peters 1999 (Middle Eocene ?-Late Oligocene of C Europe) - coliid? (synonym of Primocolius?)
    - †S. absurdipes Mayr 1998 ex Peters 1999
- Family †Sandcoleidae Houde & Olson 1992 sensu Mayr & Mourer-Chauviré 2004
  - Genus †Sandcoleus Houde & Olson 1992 (Paleocene)
    - †S. copiosus Houde & Olson 1992
  - Genus †Anneavis Houde & Olson 1992
    - †A. anneae Houde & Olson 1992
  - Genus †Eoglaucidium Fischer 1987
    - †E. pallas Fischer 1987
  - Genus †Tsidiiyazhi Ksepka, Stidham & Williamson 2017 (Paleocene of New Mexico)
    - †T. abini Ksepka, Stidham & Williamson 2017
- Family Coliidae Swainson 1837 sensu Mayr & Mourer-Chauviré 2004
  - Genus †Celericolius Ksepka & Clarke 2010
    - †C. acriala Ksepka & Clarke 2010
  - Genus †Masillacolius Mayr & Peters 1998 (middle Eocene of Messel, Germany)
    - †M. brevidactylus Mayr & Peters 1998
  - Genus †Oligocolius Mayr 2000 (Early Oligocene of Frauenweiler, Germany)
    - †O. brevitarsus Mayr 2000
    - †O. psittacocephalon Mayr 2013
  - Genus †Palaeospiza Allen 1878
    - †Palaeospiza bella Allen 1878
  - Genus †Primocolius Mourer-Chauviré 1988 (Late Eocene/Oligocene of Quercy, France)
    - †P. sigei Mourer-Chauviré 1988
    - †P. minor Mourer-Chauviré 1988
  - Subfamily Coliinae
    - Genus Urocolius (2 species)
      - U. indicus (Latham 1790) (Red-faced mousebird)
      - U. macrourus (Linnaeus 1766) (Blue-naped mousebird)
    - Genus Colius [Necrornis Milne-Edwards 1871] (4 species)
      - †C. hendeyi Vickers-Rich & Haarhoff 1985
      - †C. palustris (Milne-Edwards 1871) Ballmann 1969 [Necrornis palustris Milne-Edwards 1871]
      - C. castanotus Verreaux & Verreaux 1855 (Red-backed mousebird)
      - C. colius (Linnaeus 1766) (White-backed mousebird)
      - C. leucocephalus Reichenow 1879 (White-headed mousebird)
      - C. striatus Gmelin 1789 (Speckled mousebird)
