= Coly =

Commune in Nouvelle-Aquitaine, France

- Part of Coly-Saint-Amand
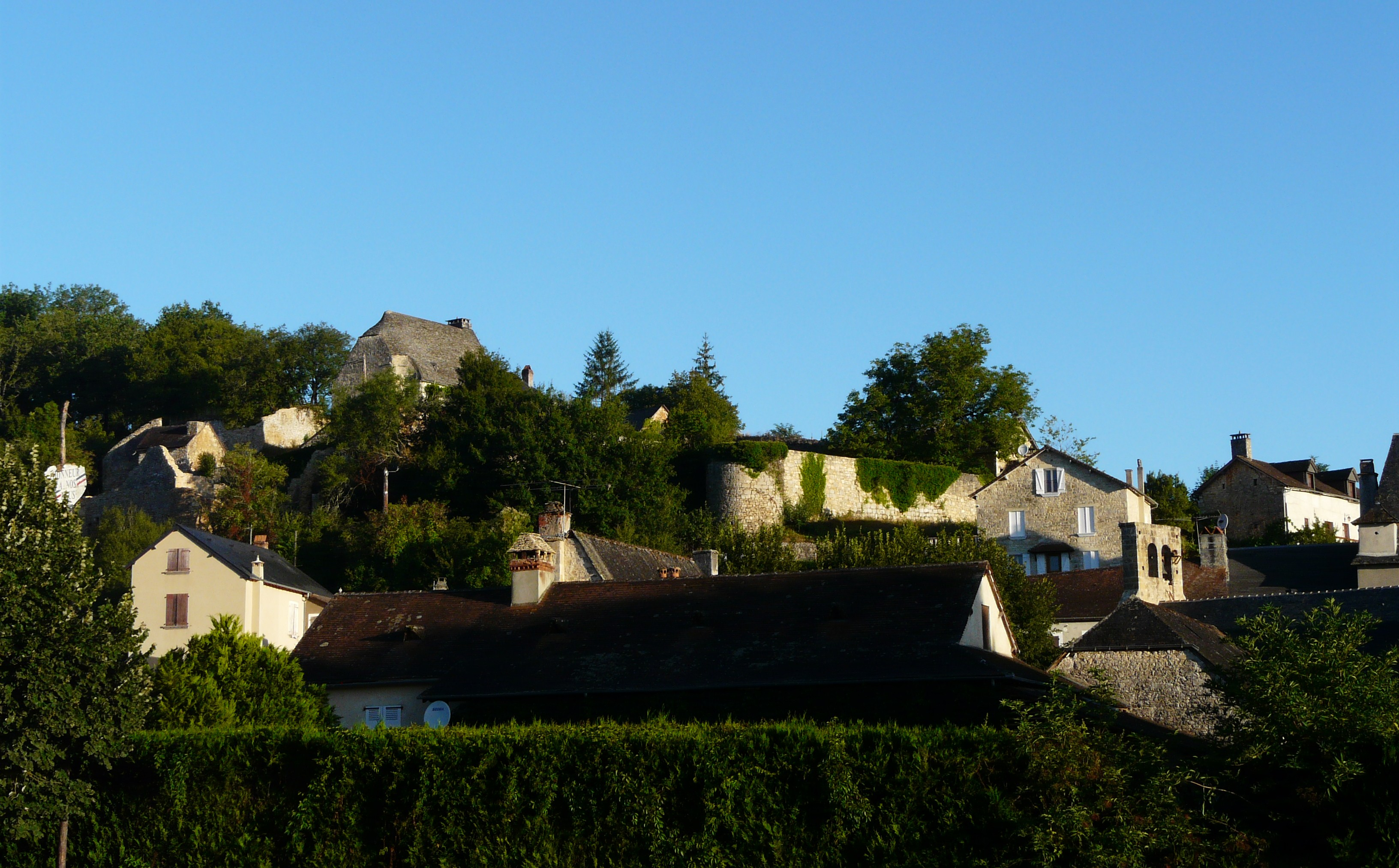
- Location of Coly
- Location within France Location within Nouvelle-Aquitaine
- Coordinates: 45°05′13″N 1°16′08″E
- Country: France
- Region: Nouvelle-Aquitaine
- Department: Dordogne
- Arrondissement: Sarlat-la-Canéda
- Canton: Terrasson-Lavilledieu
- Commune: Coly-Saint-Amand
- Area^{1}: 8.01 km^{2} (3.09 sq mi)
- Elevation: 113 m (371 ft)
- Highest elevation: 246 m (807 ft)
- Lowest elevation: 105 m (344 ft)
- Population (2023): 218
  - Density: 27.2/km^{2} (70.5/sq mi)
- Time zone: UTC+01:00 (CET)
  - Summer (DST): UTC+02:00 (CEST)
- Postal code: 24120
- ^{1} French Land Register data, which excludes lakes, ponds, glaciers > 1 km^{2} (0.386 sq mi or 247 acres) and river estuaries.

Coly (French pronunciation: [kɔli]; Occitan: En Còli) is a former commune in the Dordogne department in Nouvelle-Aquitaine in southwestern France. On 1 January 2019, it was merged into the new commune Coly-Saint-Amand.

== See also ==
- Communes of the Dordogne department
